= Bohol Force =

- Active: December 1941 – May 1942
- Disbanded: May 12, 1942
- Countries: United States of America; Philippines
- Allegiance: United States Army; Philippine Commonwealth Army
- Branch: Army; Constabulary
- Type: Infantry
- Role: Territorial Defense
- Size: 600 ~ 900
- Part of: Visayas-Mindanao Force; Visayan Force
- Garrison/HQ: Tubigon, Bohol
- Equipment: M1917 Enfield Rifles; M1923 Thompson SubMachinegun

Commanders
- Notable commanders: Captain Ismael Ingiñerio, PC Lieutenant Colonel Arthur Grimes, USA; Lieutenant Colonel John P. Woodridge, USA Colonel Guy O. Fort

Bohol Force was an island garrison force on Bohol during World War II. The island is centrally located in southern Visayas, making it strategically important due to its proximity to Cebu, Leyte, and Mindanao.

== Background ==
The island was the garrison of 81st Infantry Division under Brigadier General Guy O. Fort, it was made under the command of Visayas-Mindanao Force under Brigadier General William F. Sharp in November 1941. 81st Infantry Regiment under Lieutenant Colonel Ruperto Kangleon was ordered to transfer to island of Leyte in order to fill the defense left by 91st Division leaving only 1 regiment who is still organizing. In January 1942, 81st Division Headquarters units was ordered to Lanao and 81st Field Artillery Regiment to Cagayan in Mindanao Island.

Leaving only Philippine Constabulary units in the island, Visayas-Mindanao Headquarters ordered 1st Battalion, 83rd Infantry under Major Arthur Grimes to transfer to bolster the island defense. In March 1942, Visayan Force was activated under Brigadier General Bradford Chynoweth, all units in the Visayas came under this new headquarters based in Cebu. Sensing the invasion is imminent in the Island of Cebu he ordered Major Grimes to transfer back to Cebu to bolster its defense, leaving only PC and volunteer militia. Captain Ingiñerio assumed command left behind by Major Grimes.

On April 15, 1942 Kawaguchi detachment invaded Cebu they bypassed Bohol and proceeded to Mindanao as they considered Bohol is not a threat due to small number of troops. In April 19, Visayan Force was dissolved as it could no longer function as all communications are all cut off with the island. General Wainwright IV ordered General Sharp to reinstitute Visayas-Mindanao Force to command all remaining existing units in the Visayas as Visayan Force could no longer communicate outside Cebu.

=== Surrender and Guerilla Movement ===
On May 11, 1942, Major General Sharp ordered all units to surrender to the Japanese at daybreak. However, Captain Ingiñero escaped inland in the mountainous area of the island to setup guerilla movement to continue fighting.

=== Order of Battle ===
- 81st Infantry Division, Headquarters - Garrison in Tubigon (Transferred to Mindanao January 1942)
- 81st Infantry Regiment - Headquarters in Ubay (Transferred to Leyte in November 1941)
- 81st Field Artillery Regiment - Headquarters in Tubigon (Transferred to Mindanao January 1942)
- 1st Battalion, 83rd Infantry - Transferred from Cebu for training and transferred back to Cebu in May 1942.
- Bohol PC Company
- Bohol Militia (setup in May 1942)

== See also ==
- 81st Infantry Division, Philippine Army
- Kawaguchi Detachment
- Cebu Brigade
- Samar-Leyte Force
