= Japanese invasion of Malabang =

World War II landings by Japan on the Philippines

Japanese Invasion of Malabang
- Part of Invasion of Mindanao, the Pacific Theater of World War II
Date	April 29, 1942 – May 3, 1942
Location	Malabang, Lanao
Result	Japanese victory

Belligerents
United States of America: Commonwealth of the Philippines	Empire of Japan

Commanders and leaders
(United States) William F. Sharp (United States) Guy O. Fort (United States) Eugene T. Mitchell (United States) Robert H. Vessey (United States) Jay Navin (United States) Albert Price (Commonwealth of the Philippines) Calixto Duque (Commonwealth of the Philippines) Busnan Kalaw (Commonwealth of the Philippines) Mamalinta Lao	(Empire of Japan) Kawakaguchi Kiyotake

Units involved
Ground units: Philippine Commonwealth Army: 81st Division (Philippines); 61st Infantry Regiment (PA); 73rd Infantry Regiment (Philippines); 1st Battalion, 2nd Infantry (Regular); 1st Battalion, 84th Infantry; Artillery Detachment (2 Guns); Philippine Constabulary: Lanao PC Battalion	Ground units: Japanese Fourteenth Army: Kawaguchi Detachment; 35th Infantry Brigade; 124th Infantry Regiment; Armored Detachment; Artillery Battery

Strength
6,500 Filipino-American Troops 2x QF 2.95inch Mountain Guns	1,852 Troops

Casualties and losses
600 Killed 500 Captured 2 QF 2.95inch Mountain Guns Captured	400 Killed 1 Tank Destroyed

Japanese Invasion of Malabang (Filipino: Paglusob ng mga Hapones sa Malabang) was part of the Japanese landings on the western coast of Mindanao that began on April 29, 1942. Kawaguchi Detachment landed in three important points in west coast of Mindanao including Malabang in then undivided Lanao Province. Defending forces of Filipino and American troops resisted but lacked artillery, and due to Japanese naval and air support were overwhelmed and forced to retreat.

== Background ==
After securing the island of Panay, General Masaharu Homma ordered General Kiyotake Kawaguchi to Mindanao. He was to land in Lanao sector of Mindanao Force which was under the command of Brigadier General Guy O. Fort. Kawaguchi's naval convoy was soon spotted in the Zamboanga sector and reported to Mindanao Force HQ on April 27, 1942, at which time Fort warned his troops of the imminent invasion from his command post at Camp Kiethley.

Kawaguchi arrived and landed in Malabang on April 29, 1942. Opposing them was the 61st Infantry Regiment under Colonel Eugene T. Mitchell. Attached to the 61st was a two-gun battery of QF 2.95 inch Mountain Guns commanded by Captain Albert Price and a PC Company based in Momungan.

=== Combat narratives ===
The 3rd Battalion, 61st Infantry under Major Ernest E. McLish was deployed north of Malabang Air Field astride Ganassi Road while the 2nd Battalion 61st Infantry under Captain Clyde Childress was posted astride the Maladig River. The 1st Battalion under Major Moran was held in reserve near Lake Dapao.

The Japanese landed used the docks in Banago southeast of Malabang to land their tanks, then moved forward in an effort to quickly capture the Mataling River Bridge.

Regimental headquarters moved from Ganassi to the left side of the reserve battalion. Mitchell asked to blow up the bridge but Fort declined as the bridge was needed to give the 2nd Infantry Regiment under Lieutenant Colonel Calixto Duque a way to retreat from Parang.

Mitchell reported to General Fort that a convoy of more than 20 trucks full of Japanese soldiers with tanks and scout cars left from Parang, Cotabato to Malabang.

==== Retreat to Dansalan ====
Mitchell rounded up men to establish a holiday position. General Fort informed him of giving him 1st Battalion, 84th Infantry under Major Jay Navin. Mortars and artillery and machine gun fire rained down on the Filipinos in this position. Mitchell established another line but before his men could finish their earthworks the Japanese struck again, which scattered his exhausted, tired, dispirited men. This time Colonel Mitchell was captured, 61st Infantry was routed, which gave Japanese full control of Route 1 towards Lake Lanao.

=== Moro battalions ===
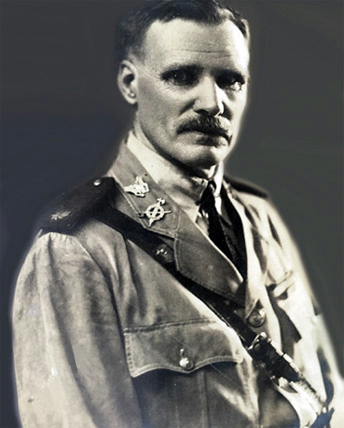
Brigadier General Guy O. Fort, Commander of 81st Infantry Division and Lanao Sector.

General Fort's confidence in the Moro battalions was validated when they ambushed a battalion-sized Japanese force travelling from Ganassi to Lumbatan. Led by Captain Mamalinta Lao, they annihilated the Japanese with only two Moros lost. Another Moro unit under Lieutenant Muhammad Ali Dimaporo and Captain Busran Kalaw continuously harassed the Japanese.

==== Reinforcement ====
Fort ordered Lieutenant Colonel Robert H. Vessey to move down one of his battalions in Bacolod, Lanao del Norte to support Mitchell. Doing reconnaissance near Ganassi, Vessey, his executive officer Tisdale and Private Childress were met by a tank, which fired at them. Vessey was able to return to Gannasi and appointed Commander Robert Strong, USN as his executive officer, thinking that Tisdale and his driver had been killed during the ambush. It was later known that Tisdale died in the jungle trying to reach the 73rd Infantry Line. Fort ordered Lieutenant Colonel Naidas of the Philippine Constabulary to establish a line from Tamparan to Taloan Hill using whatever troops he could find, and deny the Japanese entry into the east coast of the lake.

The Japanese advance resumed on May 3 towards Bacolod in a motorized column with four tanks spearheading at the 73rd Infantry's position. Direct fire from Captain Price's detachment caught the leading tank and put it out of commission, confusing the Japanese column. However, the Japanese got air support from Zamboanga, forcing the 73rd Infantry into successive retreats. In Dansalan, the 73rd Infantry and remnants of the 61st Infantry established another line to deprive the Japanese of Route 1 and link with the Kawamura Detachment.

== Execution of Jose Abad Santos ==
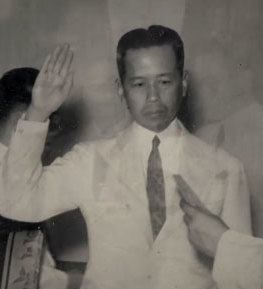
Chief Justice Jose Abad Santos, Japanese considered him acting president and executed him for refusing to collaborate.

Chief Justice Jose Abad Santos of the Philippine Commonwealth was captured in Barangay Tubod, Barili, Cebu, while riding in an automobile with his son Jose Jr (Pepito) and his aide, Lieutenant Colonel Benito Valeriano. He was brought to a Japanese camp in Basak San Nicolas, Cebu City, where the Japanese attempted to persuade him to collaborate. However he was executed May 1, 1942 and was hastily buried. Markings were allowed on his grave.

== Aftermath ==
The troops in Lanao sector were still fighting when orders from General Sharp to surrender reached General Fort on May 10, 1942. Many questioned the order, as his unit was still successfully fighting the Japanese. However, Sharp warned that any American who disobeyed his order would be court martialed. Fort surrendered on May 12, 1942 and combat operations ceased in Lanao Sector.

=== Death March and execution of Fort ===
After the troops in Lanao Sector surrendered on May 12, the Japanese forced Filipino American POWs in very poor condition to walk 136 km without water or food from Camp Keithley in Dansalan to Camp Overton in Iligan. Americans were tied by four per column and Filipinos, although not bound, were made to walk barefoot, and some were executed on the road. This event was known as the Mindanao Death March.

After General Fort's surrender, he was shipped north on the small freighter Maru San alongside other captive generals, including his commander Sharp plus Joseph P. Vachon and Manuel Roxas. After the war, Roxas would become the first president of the Philippines. Fort was then escorted by the Kempeitai to Manila, where he remained for several months. In November 1942 the Japanese sought Fort's help in talking to the Moro people, who were still fighting the Japanese. Specifically, Fort was supposed to persuade the Moros to lay down their arms, and tell them that since the U.S. Army had surrendered they must also surrender. Fort was brought from Manila back to Marawi (then known as Dansalan) on Mindanao for that purpose. However, Fort refused to cooperate and was executed. His body was never found as he was buried in an unmarked grave.
