= Japanese invasion of Cebu =

Part of the World War II Japanese invasion of the Philippines

Japanese Invasion of Cebu
| Date | April 16, 1942 – May 12, 1942 |
| Location | Cebu Island, Visayas, Philippines |
| Result | Japanese victory |
| Territorial changes | Cebu captured by the Japanese |

Belligerents
| Empire of Japan | United States of America: Commonwealth of the Philippines |

Commanders and leaders
| (Japan) Kawaguchi Kiyotake | (United States) Bradford Chynoweth (United States) Irvine Scudder (United States) Howard Edmands (United States) Rufus Rogers (United States) Arthur Grimes (United States) Cornelius Byrd (United States) John D. Cook (Commonwealth of the Philippines) Emigdio David (Commonwealth of the Philippines) Fortunato Borbon |

Units involved
| Ground units: Japanese Fourteenth Army: Kawaguchi detachment; 35th Infantry Brigade; 124th Infantry Regiment; Armored Detachment; Artillery Batteries; 10th Independent Garrison | "Ground units": USFIP – Visayan Force: Cebu Brigade; Cebu Military Police Regiment; US Army Transport Service; Philippine Commonwealth Army: 82nd Infantry Regiment; 83rd Infantry Regiment; Philippine Constabulary: Cebu PC Battalion |

Strength
| 4,500 | 6,500 |

Casualties and losses
| 500 | 1,000 |

On April 14, 1942 Kawaguchi Detachment who just landed in Lingayen, Pangasinan intended as reinforcement of the 14th Imperial Japanese Army to finally subdue Philippine-American forces in Bataan. However, General King surrendered days earlier before they arrived. Instead, General Homma Masaharu commander of 14th Army ordered them south to secure Cebu island in the Visayas intended as launching place for invasion of Mindanao after it is secured.

The island garrison was neutralized after a few days of fighting as they lacked artillery guns, no anti-aircraft guns, no antitank guns, and limited ammunition. The forces retreated but did not surrender until ordered to do so by General Sharp on May 10, 1942.

== Background ==
The island has 6,500 defending troops under Colonel Irvine Scudder who has Philippine Commonwealth Army units, Philippine Constabulary units, Philippine Army Air Corps unit, and US Navy detachment in Mactan Island. It is also based on Army Transport Service under Lieutenant Colonel Cornelius Byrd, who was responsible for bringing the supplies to Bataan and Corregidor. It has a harbor and Lahug Airfield where a few bombers and fighters to attack the Japanese in Luzon. Homma wanted to use Cebu as a launching pad for the invasion of Mindanao island and secure whatever supplies were available under Army Transport Service.

=== Disposition of Cebu Brigade ===
The Island is under the command of Colonel Irvine Scudder, who has his command post at Camp Lapulapu in Lahug, Cebu City. It has 82nd Infantry Regiment, which is based in Argao, Cebu, under Colonel Emigdio David. 83rd Infantry Regiment (less 1st Battalion) under Lieutenant Colonel Fortunato Borbon but technically under its senior instruction Lieutenant Colonel Rufus Rogers based in Liloan a northern town of Cebu. The Cebu MP Regiment under Lieutenant Colonel Howard Edmands as former Philippine Constabulary officer. A day during invasion it was transferred to Lieutenant Colonel John D. Cook's command of Cebu East sector command. Just like any other units in Visayas Islands and Mindanao they do not have a single artillery piece in the island and ammunition is limited.

Visayan Force Headquarters is also located in Cebu where it was organized a month ago. General Chynoweth and his staff are in Camp X, a Bureau of Forestry compound located in Cantabaco a town in central highway. A few days before the invasion, after getting permission from USFIP HQ he ordered 1st Battalion 83rd Infantry under Lieutenant Colonel Arthur Grimes transferred from Bohol to Cebu to cover Cantabaco and protect Camp X vicinity.

Two MP companies were posted in the Mactan Island with a naval detachment under Lieutenant Commander Slimmons, USN, in charge of the island.

== Japanese Invasion ==
On April 9, 1942, reports of Japanese naval convoy with 4 cruisers and 11 transports from Luzon is spotted south of Panay by a P40 Warhawk fighter who landed in Lahug Field in Cebu has reached Visayan Force Headquarters. General Bradford Chynoweth alerted all his units of imminent invasion of the Japanese in the Visayas Islands.

=== Landing in West Coast ===
Major General Kawaguchi Kiyotake sent 124th Infantry Regiment to west coast of southern Cebu and landed in Barangay Bato, Pinamungajan, Cebu on April 16. Kawaguchi moved north with tanks and artillery support towards Toledo. Opposing them is 1st Battalion 82nd Infantry under Major Daniel Iway. General Bradford ordered Lieutenant Colonel Grimes to moved forward and repulse Japanese nearing Barangay Uling.

=== Landings in East Coast ===
The Japanese sent a group to land in Sibonga, another group landed in San Fernando however it withdrew before Captain Ernest V. Jordan Brigade Operations Officer brought 3rd Battalion 82nd Infantry. Later Japanese landed in Talisay and was opposed by Cebu MP Regiment. Colonel Edmands MPs initially hold off Japanese at the beaches but Naval fire support made his troops retreated to Cebu City. Colonel Edmands ordered Naval Detachment to start the demolition and the two companies cross back to Cebu through Mandaue pier. However, they cross back through Cebu pier where Japanese also landed the same time.

== Visayan Force Headquarters Evacuation ==
As the demolition charges placed on bridges failed to detonate and 1st Battalion 83rd Infantry failed to carry its mission in Cantabaco, General Chynoweth and Colonel Scudder decided to evacuate the headquarters to Sudlon, Cebu City. Cebu Brigade evacuated towards Busay, Cebu City and left evacuated supplies in Cebu Sierra Madre Mountains. Chynoweth arranged Colonel Roger Hilsman his Force Chief of Staff who is ill to transfer to Negros and maintained a liaison with USFIP and Mindanao Force.

Supplies in the warehouses of Army Transport Service was brought to the mountains, some issued to units and civilians to ensure nothing is left to the Japanese. This resulted to torture and brutal beatings of Colonel Cook upon knowing is left and leaving the Japanese ship sent to Cebu to get all the supplies ended empty handed.

== Aftermath ==
After Visayan Force headquarters unable to maintained contact outside Cebu having been isolated in Cebu Sierra Madre Mountains, General Wainwright upon realization that Cebu is lost, receiving Colonel Hilsman's report that Cebu combat operation has cease ordered General Sharp of Mindanao Force to reconstitute his old command the Visayas-Mindanao Force to command the other island garrisons that still exists.

Kawaguchi Detachment was able to defeat the Cebu Brigade and in control of the island including Cebu ports and Lahug field which is vital for their next conquest of the Japanese, the Mindanao Island.

Philippine Commonwealth Supreme Court Chief Justice Jose Abad Santos was captured in Barili, Cebu and was brought to Malabang, Lanao and was executed in May 1942.
