= 83rd Infantry Regiment (PA) =

- Active: November 1941 - May 1942
- Disbanded: May 12, 1942
- Countries: United States; Philippines
- Allegiance: United States Army
- Branch: Army
- Type: Infantry
- Role: Reserve
- Size: 1,500
- Part of: 81st Infantry Division
- Garrison/HQ: Tubigon, Bohol
- Equipment: M1917 Enfield Rifles M1923 Thompson Submachineguns M1918 Browning Automatic Rifles
- Engagements: Battle of Cebu Island (1941)

Commanders
- Notable commanders: Lieutenant Colonel Rufus "Bill" Rodgers, USA; Colonel Fortunato Borbon, PA

Insignia
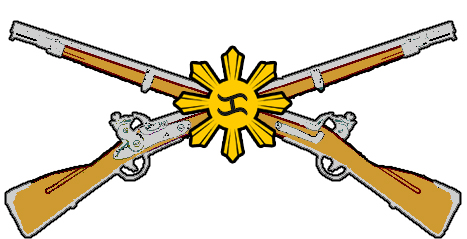
- Identification symbol

83rd Infantry Regiment of the Philippine Army is a reserve unit activated and organized in late 1941 few months before WW II commenced in the Philippines. It fought in Cebu Island during Japanese landings in April 1942 but ordered surrendered in May 1942. It was disbanded after all soldiers were POWs but some escaped and joined the guerilla movement in Cebu.

== Organization ==
The regiment was activated with reserve soldiers coming mostly from Cebu and Bohol islands. Officers came from the main island of Luzon including its commander Lieutenant Colonel Fortunato Borbon a PC officer. The regiment was still organizing went hostilities broke in December 1941, and soldiers has not been full trained neither fired its issues weapons. Except for the 3rd Battalion under Major Arthur Grimes which was left in Bohol to organized its defense, the entire regiment was transferred to the Northern part of Cebu Island with headquarters in Liloan town. In January 1942 the 81st Infantry Division Headquarters and its supporting units were ordered transferred to Mindanao. 83rd and 82nd Infantry were left to maintain the island defense. The 2 infantry regiments along with 808th MP Regiment comprises the Cebu Brigade under Colonel Irvine Scudder. In April, Lieutenant Colonel Rufus Rodgers took over the command of the regiment and continued the training of his men.

=== Japanese landing in Cebu ===
A new command was established Visayas Force to command all forces in the Visayas islands. Its commander Brigadier General Bradford Chynoweth established his headquarters at Camp X, Cantabaco in the southern Cebu. Realizing the critical point in securing the cross-island highway ordered Major Grimes to transfer 3rd Battalion, 83rd Infantry to Cebu from Bohol.

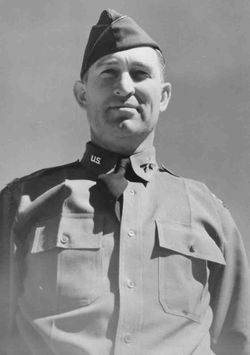
Commander of 83rd Infantry Regiment during battle of Cebu in April 1942.

Kawaguchi Detachment landed in the southern coasts of Cebu on April 17, 1942, which 82nd Infantry Regiment fought hard to repulse these landings in Toledo and Talisay moving towards Cantabaco. 3rd Battalion was tasked to secure the town but after few skirmishes the overwhelming Japanese firepower with naval and air support was too much and they were forced to retreat inland. A demolition was set but when it failed to explode Major Grimes moved forward to scout the Japanese position but he was never seen again.

General Chynoweth ordered Colonel Rodgers who was in Liloan, to send reinforcements but due to lack of motor vehicles to transport one of his battalion it took them longer to reach Cebu by walking but a confusion of the order made the battalion turned around losing time to reinforce Cantabaco. it was lost and entire Visayas Force Headquarters retreated towards mountainous area of Sudlon. The defense of Cebu was disorganized in April 19, it was considered lost and communication was not established between forces outside Cebu and Visayas Force HQ and it was dissolved by General Wainwright.

=== Surrender ===
On May 12, 1942, upon order of General William F. Sharp the commander of Visayas-Mindanao Force all units surrendered and soldiers are now POWs. The unit disbanded was never reactivated after the war.

== See also ==
- Visayas Force
- 81st Infantry Division
- Cebu Brigade
- 82nd Infantry Regiment
- Fortunato Borbon
- Bradford Chynoweth
