= 94th Provisional Infantry Regiment (PA) =

94th Infantry Regiment
- Active: Leyte Provisional Regiment
- Disbanded: May 12, 1942
- Countries: United States of America; Philippine Commonwealth
- Allegiance: United States Army
- Branch: Army, PC
- Type: Territorial defense
- Role: Infantry
- Size: 2,500
- Part of: Samar-Leyte Force, Visayan Force; Samar-Leyte Force, Visayas-Mindanao Force
- Garrison/HQ: Tacloban, Leyte

Commanders
- Notable commanders: Lieutenant Colonel Gordon Lang, USA; Lieutenant Colonel Juan Causing, PA

Insignia
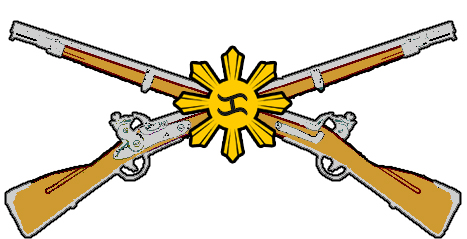
- Identification symbol

94th Provisional Infantry Regiment is a territorial defense organized by Colonel Theodore Cornell to defend the island of Leyte in 1942. On September 1, 1941, 91st Infantry Division under Colonel Luther R. Stevens, PA was ordered to moved to Luzon island to bolster the defense of the main island of the Philippines. The only remaining combat unit was 93rd Infantry Regiment under Lieutenant Colonel Ben-Hur Chastaine which was still organizing. To bolster is defense Visayas-Mindanao Force commander ordered 81st Infantry Division commander then Colonel Guy O. Fort to transfer 81st Infantry Regiment under Lieutenant Colonel Ruperto Kangleon to Samar. The 81st Infantry Regiment and 93rd Infantry comprises now the Samar Brigade under the command of Colonel Ben-Hur Chastaine.

== Background ==
In January 1942, Visayas-Mindanao Force Commander then Brigadier General William F. Sharp ordered Samar Brigade to transfer in Mindanao island via Surigao to cover Agusan Sector with its headquarters in Anakan Lumber Co Compound in Gingoog, Misamis Oriental.

=== Organization ===
Colonel Theodore Cornell organized another regiment to replace the units who has left for Mindanao. It was named Leyte Provisional Regiment organized from the trainees, cadres, and Leyte provisional battalion left in the Leyte island. Lieutenant Colonel Juan Causing became its commander.

=== Surrender ===
The unit was surrendered on May 12, 1942, without seeing action as General Wainwright USFIP ordered all combat units to surrender. General Chynoweth ordered the surrender as well as he was ordered by Visayas-Mindanao Force commander General Sharp to comply.

== Reactivation to Guerilla Movement ==
The regiment was reactivated and now named as 94th Infantry Regiment. At first an expedient resistance movement was formed out of remnants of the Philippine Army and Constabulary and bands of disaffected youth. Later these guerrilla units were organized into sectors headed by Captain Glicerio I. Erfe in the east, Alejandro Balderian in the north and northeast, Blas Miranda in the northwest, and Colonel Ruperto Kangleon in the south. David Richardson's efficient intelligence system, the forming of guerilla units into the Southern Leyte Guerilla Units, i.e., the 94th Infantry Regiment, under Gordon Lang; and the establishment of the Free Leyte government as the principal counterpart of the Philippine Commonwealth de jure under the governorship of Salvador Demetrio formed the nucleus of organized opposition.

The regiment prepared the General MacArthur's return in the Philippines in its landing in the Island of Leyte on October 20, 1944.

== See also ==
- 91st Infantry Division
- Visayan Force
- Mindanao Force
- Visayas-Mindanao Force
