= 84th Infantry Regiment (PA) =

- Active: February 1942 - May 1942
- Disbanded: May 1942
- Countries: United States of America; Philippines
- Allegiance: United States Army
- Branch: Army
- Type: Infantry
- Role: Bolo
- Size: 500
- Part of: 81st Infantry Division
- Garrison/HQ: Camp Kiethley, Dansalan, Lanao
- Equipment: M1917 Enfield Rifles; Bolo
- Engagements: Battle of Malabang

Commanders
- Notable commanders: Major Jay Navin

Insignia
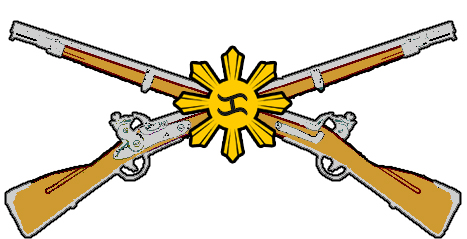
- Identification symbol

84th Infantry Regiment is a provisional military unit and formation of the Philippine Army organized during WW II to bolster the defense of Lanao Sector. It fought in Lanao during Japanese landing in Malabang and moved northward to Dansalan.

== Organization ==
The idea to form a Bolo Battalion came from Brigadier General Guy O. Fort commander of 81st Infantry Division and Lanao Sector. His experienced with Moros over the years being a PC officer serving in Mindanao, having high regard and respect of their fighting abilities. He formed this unit to augment his division which only have 2 infantry regiments and service troops. Major Jay Navin was appointed to command the initial battalion and later anticipated expansion into a regiment.

With lack of rifles soldiers resorted to Bolos, Kris, Darong, and Bows and Arrows. Thus, it was called Bolo Battalion. At one point the Regiment reached to 20,000 Moro volunteers but when the battle started many went back home or simply disappeared.

=== Japanese landings ===
Kawaguchi detachment landed in Cotabato, Parang in Cotabato Province. Another contingent in Malabang in Lanao. Contingents from Parang and Malabang moved northward towards Dansalan to link up with Kawamura detachment who landed in Cagayan de Oro. 61st Infantry Regiment under Colonel Eugene Mitchell tasked to prevent the Japanese to move northward but his regiment was easily overwhelmed due to Japanese combined infantry, artillery, and air supports. Mitchell requested for reinforcement and General Fort sent 1/84th Infantry under Major Navin for his disposal. This did not prevent Japanese advanced and easily defeated and overwhelmed the defensive position Mitchell put up and eventually captured him.

81st Infantry Division troops including the Moro Battalion, although retreating are still fighting and successful in delaying to move north when ordered to surrender on May 11, 1942. Majority of Moro-Bolo Battalion dispersed without a trace but few surrendered including Major Jay Navin, who was executed during the death march from Dansalan to Iligan.

The Battalion was disbanded but those who refused to surrender resorted to guerilla warfare and ambuscade resulting high casualties of Japanese.

== Notable Members ==
- Busran Kalaw - Folk hero guerilla
- Mamalintal Lao
- Mohammad Ali Dimaporo - Woulld became congressman and governor Lanao provinces.
- Manalao Mindalano
