= 81st Field Artillery Regiment (PA) =

Philippine army unit

- Active: August 1941 - May 1942
- Disbanded: May 12, 1942
- Countries: United States of America; Philippines
- Allegiance: United States of America
- Branch: Army
- Type: Field Artillery
- Role: Reserve
- Size: 1,500
- Part of: 102nd Infantry Division; 81st Infantry Division
- Garrison/HQ: Camp Lapulapu, Cebu
- Equipment: M1918 75mm Guns; M1917 Enfield Rifles
- Engagements: Battle of Malabang; Battle of Cagayan de Oro

Commanders
- Notable commanders: Lieutenant Colonel John Woodridge

81st Field Artillery Regiment is a reserve unit of Philippine Commonwealth Army activated in August 1941 as part of 81st Infantry Division. It was organized and inducted in Cebu out of reserve soldiers and officers.

== Organization ==
The regiment was inducted by 1Lieutenant Russell Cracraft in Cebu in August 1941. They proceed to Tubigon, Bohol for training. However, no artillery guns reached Visayas and Mindanao as SS Corregidor sunk at Manila Bay. Regiment shifted to train as infantry due no guns available.

Initial commander was 1Lieutenant Jose B, Hidalgo, 1st Battalion under 1Lieutenant Mariano J. Campos, 2nd Battalion under 2Lieutenant Rosauro Dongallo, and 3rd Battalion under 1Lieutenant Antonio Campo. Major John P. Woodridge was the senior instructor but assumed command in January 1942.

== Transfer to Mindanao ==
The regiment received an order to move to Mindanao on January 3, 1942. Lieutenant Colonel Woodridge transferred to Mindanao via Bugo port in Cagayan de Oro, Misamis Oriental. New orders received and the 81st Field Artillery was to remain in Cagayan de Oro to cover beach defenses along with 61st Field Artillery.

== Japanese landings ==
When Kawaguchi Detachment landed in Malabang and moved towards Dansalan. An artillery detachment from 81st Field Artillery under Captain Albert Price with 3 M1918 75mm Guns was to Lanao to provide fire support. It gave some confidence for General Guy Fort's 81st division. However, it didn't help to stop the rapid advance of the Japanese.

Kawamura Detachment appeared in Macajalar Bay and started landing in Bugo and Tagaloan beach. Regiment fighting as infantry tried to repulse the landings but the combined infantry, naval and air support of the Japanese forced Colonel Woodridge's troops to withdraw and retreated to Sayre Highway and posted in Alae to cover the withdrawal of 62nd Infantry Regiment.

== Battle of Mangima Grand Canyon ==
Defense of Mangima Canyon, a natural barrier between Misamis and Bukidnon, fell to 93rd Infantry, 103rd Infantry, and 81st Infantry with Artillery Detachment under Major Paul Phillips. The regiment suffered high casualties and was forced to retreat towards Dalirig.

== Surrender ==
On May 11, 1942, General Sharp ordered all units under him to surrender at daybreak.

== See also ==
- 81st Infantry Division
- 81st Infantry Regiment
- 82nd Infantry Regiment
- 83rd Infantry Regiment
- 102nd Infantry Division
