= John P. Woodridge =

American Army officer

- Died: January 9, 1945
- Burial place: Walls of the Missing, Manila American Cemetery, McKinley Road, Fort Bonifacio
- Military career
- Allegiance: United States of America
- Branch: United States Army
- Service years: 1924 - 1945
- Rank: Colonel
- Service number: O-016478
- Commands: 81st Field Artillery Regiment (PA)
- Conflicts: Battle of Mindanao
- Awards: Legion of Merit Purple Heart Silver Star

John P. Woodridge is an American Army officer who served in World War II in the Philippines. He was known as commander 81st Field Artillery Regiment that fought Japanese in Mindanao in May 1942. He was POW and he boarded a hell ship to be taken to Mukden, Manchuria but was bombed and he went missing. He was promoted to full Colonel posthumously in 1945.

== Career ==
He was assigned as senior instructor to 81st Field Artillery Regiment based in Bohol, attached to 81st Infantry Division. In January 1942, he was ordered to assumed to command of the regiment and ordered to transfer the regiment to Mindanao. Upon arrival his regiment was placed under the new unit 102nd Infantry Division under Colonel William P. Morse.

On May 6, 1942 Kawamura Detachment invaded northern Mindanao and both 81st Field Artillery and 61st Field Artillery assigned to defend northern Misamis was pushed back due to combined air and naval support of the landing force. Without a single gun themselves they retreated towards Sayre Highway.

81st Field Artillery retreated towards Sayre Highway and prepared a new defensive line in Mangima Grand Canyon. After Japanese breached Mangima Canyon 81st Field Artillery and others units retreated to Somilao Sector and posted in Dalirig. Last Japanese incursion in the line on the night on May 10, 1942, although Mindanao Force troops successfully repulsed it they took heavy casualties. By dawn orders came to surrender at daybreak of May 12, 1942. All US and Filipino troops assembled in Camp Casisang, Malaybalay, Bukidnon.

All Americans was held while Filipino soldiers were released in August 1942. Americans was brought to Luzon in preparation to be transferred to Japan. Woodridge among them was boarded in one of the hell ship that was bombed by American planes on the way to Formosa in January 1945. He was lost in the sea and never found.

Woodridge was posthumously promoted to Colonel and was put in the Walls of Missing in Manila American Cemetery at Fort Bonifacio, Philippines.

== See also ==
- Mindanao Force
- 81st Field Artillery Regiment (PA)
- 81st Infantry Division (Philippines)
- Visayas-Mindanao Force
