= 73rd Infantry Regiment (Philippines) =

Philippine army unit

- Active: September 1, 1973 - May 11, 1942
- Disbanded: May 11, 1942
- Countries: United States of America; Commonwealth of the Philippines
- Allegiance: United States Army
- Branch: Army
- Type: Infantry
- Role: Infantry
- Size: 1,800
- Part of: 81st Infantry Division Negros Force 71st Infantry Division
- Garrison/HQ: Camp Leon Kilat, Camp Overton, Dumaguete, Iligan, Lanao, Negros Oriental
- Equipment: M1917 Enfield .30 Caliber Bolt Action Rifles; M1903 Springfield .30 Caliber Bolt Action Rifles; M1923 Thompson .45 ACP Submachineguns; M1918 Browning .30 Caliber Automatic Rifles; M1911 Colt .45 Caliber Pistol
- Engagements: Battle of Lanao

Commanders
- Notable commanders: Colonel Robert H. Vessey, USA Captain Juan Taduran

Insignia
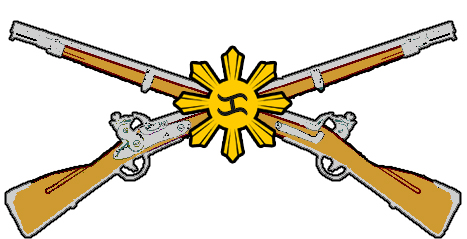
- Identification symbol

The 73rd Infantry Regiment of the Philippine Commonwealth Army was activated on August 25, 1941. On September 1, 1941, the regiment was inducted into the United States Army Forces in the Far East by Captain Eugene B. Hicker of the U.S. Army. As the last of the three authorized regiments to be organized, it was not included when the entire 71st Infantry Division was ordered to transfer to the main island of Luzon in September 1941.

== Background ==
After its activation, 78 officers, led by Captain Juan K. Taduran and 20 senior enlisted men were called to active duty at Camp Leon Kilat. After induction, the regiment was moved to Magallon for further specialized training. The 71st Infantry Division was ordered to transfer to the main island of Luzon, leaving the 73rd Infantry Regiment behind on the island of Negros.

In November 1941, the regiment was mobilized to its full wartime strength. Major Robert H. Vessey of the U.S. Army became its commanding officer on December 15, 1941, with Captain Stephen M. Byars serving as acting regimental executive officer and commander of the Headquarters (HQ) Battalion. Later, Major Tisdale succeeded him as executive officer. The regimental staff included Second Lieutenant Monico V. Ausejo as S1 and Adjutant; Second Lieutenant Alfredo Tomada as Assistant Adjutant; Second Lieutenant Perfecto Arribas as S2 (Intelligence); First Lieutenant Emilio P. Arboleda as S3 (Operations); Captain Leodegario Ramos as S4; Second Lieutenant Timoteo S. Oracion as Assistant S4; and First Lieutenant Simeon O. Mamicpic as Regimental Signal Officer.

The HQ and HQ Battalion was under the command of Captain Byars, with First Lieutenant Simeon O. Mamicpic serving as his Executive Officer. American First Lieutenant Albert F. Chase was appointed Commanding Officer (CO) of the 1st Battalion; First Lieutenant Jack Lare served as CO of the 2nd Battalion; and First Lieutenant John W. Stephens as CO of the 3rd Battalion.

The regiment did not escape the widespread plague of broken extractors, which led to the cancellation of the marksmanship training.

=== Transfer to Mindanao ===
The regiment was ordered to transfer to Mindanao Island and set sail on January 6, 1942, arriving the following day. Upon their arrival on January 7, they were attached to the 81st Infantry Division, commanded by Brigadier General Guy O. Fort, covering the northwest coast of the Lanao sector. Colonel Vessey established his HQ at Camp Overton, near Maria Cristina Falls.

==== Combat narratives ====
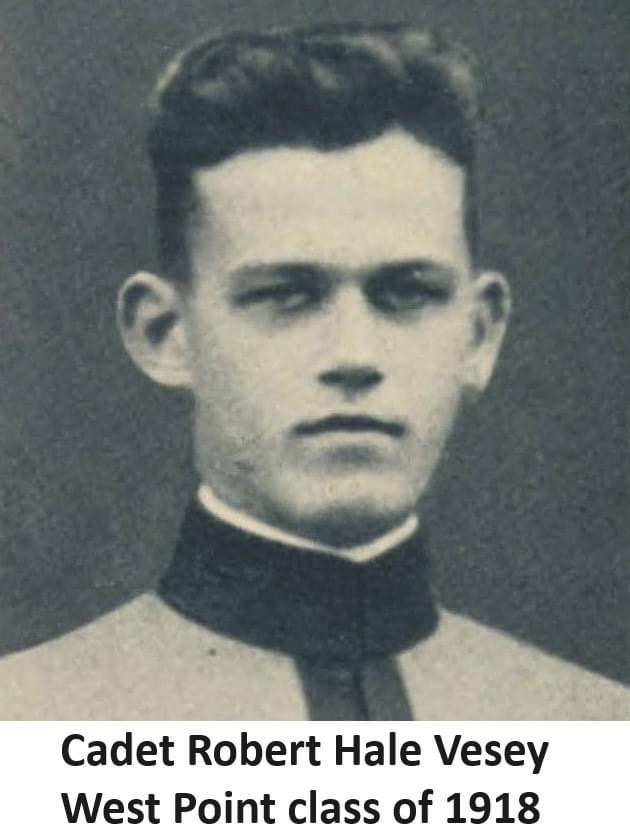
Lieutenant Colonel Robert H. Vessey, appointed as commander of 73rd Infantry Regiment, Philippine Army. A cadet of USMA in this photo.

The Kawaguchi Detachment landed in Cotabato City and Parang, both in Cotabato Province. Simultaneously, another Japanese force landed in Malabang, Lanao. Their objective was to move northward and link up with the Kawamura Detachment in the Cagayan sector. The 61st Infantry Regiment was routed, and its commander, Colonel Mitchell, was captured, and the 73rd Infantry Regiment remained the only intact regiment in the Lanao sector.

General Fort ordered Colonel Vessey to move two of his battalions in the vicinity of Lake Lanao, which was positioned in the path of the Kawaguchi Detachment. Colonel Vessey, along with his executive officer (XO), Major Tisdale, and with an American enlisted man, moved forward to reconnoiter the front, but they were ambushed by a tank. They became separated, but Colonel Vessey was able to return to the communication post. Major Tisdale and the corporal strayed through the jungle, where they encountered two Moros who initially offered to guide them but later attacked them, killing Major Tisdale.

Colonel Vessey appointed Lieutenant Commander Strong as his executive officer and continued the fight against the Japanese.

==== Surrender ====
The regiment was still fighting in the Ganassi and Bacolod areas of Lanao Province when orders from Mindanao Force Headquarters to surrender reached General Fort on May 10, 1942. Initially, Fort questioned the order, as his men were fighting very well in his sector and preventing the Japanese from reaching the Cagayan sector. General Sharp, the force commander, insisted that the order be carried out the following day. Fort then ordered Colonel Vessey to stand down and wait for further instructions. On May 22, 1942, all forces under the 81st Division, including the 73rd Infantry Regiment, surrendered.

==== Death March in Mindanao ====
The 73rd Infantry Regiment and the remnants of the 61st Infantry Regiment were involved in another death march that took place in Mindanao. The Japanese forced them to march from Dansalan to Camp Overton in Iligan, without food or water. Colonel Vessey, along with other officers, was executed by the Japanese on the road as a warning to his men, who were escaping at every opportunity.

=== American Servicemen assigned to the regiment ===
- Robert H. Vessey, Colonel, Regimental CO
- Tisdale, Major, Regimental XO
- Samuel Byars, Major, Regimental XO & HQ Battalion CO
- Albert F. Chase, Captain, 1st Battalion CO
- Jack Lare, Captain, 2nd Battalion CO
- John W. Stephens, Captain, 3rd Battalion CO

== See also ==
- 71st Infantry Division (Philippines)
- 81st Infantry Division (Philippines)
- Mindanao Force
