= Samar–Leyte Force =

Samar-Leyte Force
- Active: September 1941 - May 12, 1942
- Disbanded: May 12, 1942
- Countries: United States of America; Philippines
- Allegiance: United States Army
- Branch: Philippine Commonwealth Army; Philippine Constabulary
- Type: Infantry
- Role: Island Garrison
- Size: 2,500
- Part of: Visayas-Mindanao Force; Visayan Force; Visayas-Mindanao Force
- Garrison/HQ: Leyte
- Equipment: M1917 Enfield Rifles; M1903 Springfield Rifles; M1923 and M1928 Thompson Submachinegun; M1918 Browning Automatic Rifle; M1917 Browning Machinegun

Commanders
- Notable commanders: Colonel Theodore Cornell

Samar-Leyte Force is garrison during World War II in the Philippines, the main objective is to prevent any invasion of the Japanese for the islands of Samar and Leyte located in the eastern Visayas Islands. The Garrison was not able to see action directly but provided troops to Luzon and Mindanao fronts. The Japanese did not land until the US Forces Philippines surrendered in May 1942. However, the sector was the highest guerilla activity in the entire country after the surrender.

== Background ==
In August 1941, 9th Military District activated and organized 91st Division units such as 91st, 92nd, 93rd Infantry Regiments and 91st Field Artillery. However, entire division except for 93rd Infantry was transferred to Luzon in September to augment the defending forces there. Colonel Theodore Cornell assumed command of the sector with only 93rd Infantry as it was left because it was still being organized and soldiers are just reporting for training. In November 1941, 81st Infantry under Lieutenant Colonel Ruperto Kangleon a Leyte native transferred from Bohol to bolster the defense of the island. These regiments with PC battalions of Samar and Leyte comprised the Samar Brigade under Colonel Ben-Hur Chastaine.

In January 1942, General Sharp ordered Samar Brigade to transfer to Mindanao via Surigao leaving no troops except trainees and PC units in the island. Colonel Cornell immediate organized the Leyte Infantry Regiment (Provisional) from trainees and volunteers in the sector. It was later renamed to 94th Infantry Regiment under Lieutenant Colonel Juan Causing of the Philippine Army. In March Visayas-Mindanao Force was split to separate unit, the garrison now reporting to Visayan Force based in Cebu under Brigadier General Bradford Chynoweth former commander of 61st Infantry Division based in Panay.

=== Order of Battle ===
- Samar Brigade - Lieutenant Colonel Ben-Hur Chastaine
  - 93rd Infantry Regiment - Major Joseph Webb | Lieutenant Colonel Ben-Hur Chastaine
  - 81st Infantry Regiment - Lieutenant Colonel Arden Boelner | Lieutenant Colonel Ruperto Kangleon
- 94th Infantry Regiment (Provisional) - Lieutenant Colonel Juan Causing, PA
