= Fortunato Borbon =

Filipino politician

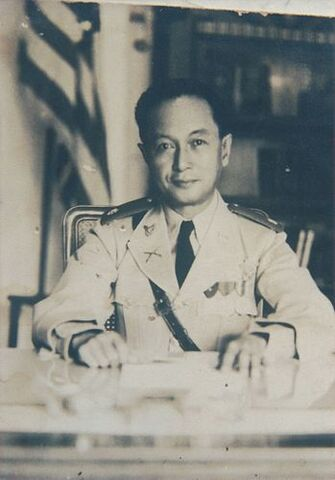

14th Governor of Batangas
- In office January 1945 – January 1946
- Preceded by: Maximo Malvar
- Succeeded by: Vicente del Rosario

Commander, 83rd Infantry Regiment
- In office August 28, 1941 – May 12, 1942 Co-leading with Lieutenant Colonel William "Rufus" Rogers

Personal details
- Born: February 28, 1890 Batangas, Batangas, Captaincy General of the Philippines
- Died: March 25, 1954 (aged 64) Matabungkay, Lian, Batangas, Philippines
- Spouse: Socorro de Borbon
- Occupation: Soldier, Politician
- Profession: Soldier, Politician

Military service
- Allegiance: Philippines
- Branch/service: Philippine Army; Philippine Constabulary
- Years of service: 1917 - 1945
- Rank: Colonel
- Unit: Cebu Brigade; 81st Division (Philippines)
- Commands: 83rd Infantry Regiment (PA)
- Battles/wars: First Battle of Cebu (April 16–19, 1942)

Fortunato Borbon (February 28, 1890 – March 25, 1954) was a former soldier and politician in the Philippines. He was Captain in Philippine Constabulary and became a provincial commander of Palawan in 1931 to 1934 prior Philippines was transition to a Commonwealth.

== World War II ==
Borbon was a Colonel and the commander 83rd Infantry Regiment (PA) a component of 81st Infantry Division under BGen. Guy O. Fort in Cebu. His regiment was posted in northern part of Cebu Island as it was still mobilizing when 81st Division headquarters along with 81st Infantry Regiment and 81st Field Artillery Regiment was ordered transfer to Mindanao. His regiment was absorbed by Col. Irvine Scudder in Cebu Brigade. Lacking weapons, ammunitions, and artilleries Cebu Force was easily decimated by Kawaguchi Detachment and retreated further north. He became POW along with his men after BGen. Bradford Chynoweth received orders from MGen. Sharp to surrender.

== Later career ==
Borbon was governor of Batangas province in the Philippines in the period immediately following World War II, from January 1945 to January 1946. As governor, he testified in US court about the atrocities committed by the Japanese, such as the torturing and killing of civilians.

== See also ==
- 81st Infantry Division (Philippines)
- 83rd Infantry Regiment (PA)
