= 82nd Infantry Regiment (PA) =

- Active: August 28, 1941 – May 12, 1942
- Disbanded: May 12, 1942
- Countries: United States; Philippines
- Allegiance: United States Army
- Branch: Army
- Type: Infantry
- Role: Territorial Defense
- Size: 2000
- Part of: Cebu Brigade; 81st Infantry Division
- Garrison/HQ: Camp Candabong, Argao, Cebu
- Engagements: Battle of Sibonga Battle of Cantabaco Battle of Toledo

Commanders
- Notable commanders: Colonel Emigdio David

Insignia
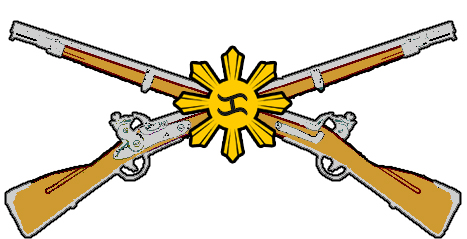
- Identification symbol

82nd Infantry Regiment is a unit activated by the Philippine Commonwealth Army for the defense of the Philippine during World War II. It defended the Cebu Island particularly in the southern part of Cebu during the Japanese landings in Cebu island on April 16, 1942. It surrendered on May 12, 1942, after it was ordered by Visayas-Mindanao Force commander General Sharp to surrender.

== Background ==
The regiment was called to active on August 28, 1941, in Candabong, Argao, Cebu. It was inducted to USAFFE on September 1, 1941, by 1st Lieutenant Russell H. Cracraft. It was commanded by Philippine Army regular officer Lieutenant Colonel Emigdio David. The regiment moved to Tubigon, Bohol its training. The regiment with 5 American Army officers and enlisted men attached with the regiment as instructors, among then Major Alvin T. Wilson as senior instructor who will see action in Davao and later command Zamboanga sector. Zamboanga sector. 2Lt. Richard L. Cook, Sergeant Lowery, Sgt. Henry W. Macner of Co I 31st Inf., and Sgt. Edward Schmidt, Co. K 31st Inf.

Among regimental staff officers was then 3rd Lieutenant Manuel F. Segura was assigned as Adjutant and S1.

Battalion Commanders are HQ Battalion commanded by 1st Lieutenant Francisco Solis, 1st Battalion commanded by Captain Mariano Rafols which has Captain Sharp as its military instructor, 2nd Battalion commanded by 1st Lieutenant Luis Jakosalem which has 1Lieutenant Richard Cook as its instructor, and 3rd Battalion commanded by Captain Olegario Baura which also have Captain Manson as its instructor.

=== Area of Assignment ===
HQ Battalion was posted in regimental CPY in Argao, 1st Battalion was assigned in the southern east coast of Cebu covering Sibonga to Talisay and 3rd Battalion was assigned at southern west coast of Cebu covering Toledo which was seen as most vulnerable. 2nd Battalion was assigned in Bohol before left for Mindanao.

=== Battle of Davao ===
Major Wilson senior instructor of 82nd Infantry Regiment was ordered to bring 2nd Battalion, 82nd Infantry who was in Bohol to Mindanao. They moved to Davao City to reinforced Davao Force under Lieutenant Colonel Roger Hilsman. It took a vessel to bring them to Butuan and took motor transport inland and reached Davao on December 12, 1941. Colonel Hilsman assigned them to southern part of the city to prevent landings in Daliao-Talomo-Matina River. Major Wilson setup his battalion on beach defenses digging trenches. He established his headquarters at Happy Life Blues Cabaret located in Davao South Road.

==== Cebu Island ====
81st Infantry Division HQ & HQ Units were ordered transferred Mindanao in January 1942 to bolster its defenses. 82nd Infantry Regiment (less 2nd Battalion) and 83rd Infantry Regiment (less 3rd Battalion) were left in Cebu and 3rd Battalion 83rd Infantry who was in Bohol. Along with 808th Military Police Regiment they are now comprises the newly organized Cebu Brigade under Colonel Irvine Scudder. Colonel David to replaced 2nd Battalion which is still in Mindanao organized a provisional battalion under Major Daniel Iway. In March, Visayas-Mindanao Force was split into two units, Visayan Force was established its headquarters in Camp X. Cantabaco, In central mountains of Cebu under Brigadier General Bradford Chynoweth.

== Japanese landings ==
After Luzon Force surrendered General Homma ordered Sakaguchi detachment to secure Cebu island. Intelligence report of Japanese invasion force is on way to the Visayas Island has reached Visayan Force HQ, General Chynoweth put all his units on high alert. The invasion reach Cebu on April 16, 1942, and started to embark its invasion on the southern part of Cebu. Colonel deployed his regiment which covers the southern part of Cebu island. Kawaguchi split into two groups one towards west coast in Tañon Strait and the other to the eastern coast.

=== Battle Fronts ===
==== Toledo ====
Japanese landed in Barangay Bato, Pinamungajan and moved towards Toledo which aims to reach Cantabaco located in the Central inter-island crossing highway where Visayan Force HQ is situated. 3rd Battalion under Major Daniel Iway who showed an excellent combat officer gave the Japanese a hard time. When news reached Chynoweth that Japanese was able to moved towards Barangay Uling with tanks, he ordered 3/83rd Infantry move forward to prevent Japanese reached Cantabaco.

==== Sibonga ====
A small Japanese contingent landed in Sibonga, Cebu aimed to secure Argao and southern tip of the island.

==== Talisay ====
Initially the Japanese made a faint in San Fernando, upon hearing Major Ernest V. Jordan the Visayan Force Operations Officer brought 1st Battalion, 82nd Infantry to meet but when the arrived the Japanese left and landed in Talisay.

== Surrender ==
The regiment was still fighting when General Chynoweth following General Sharp who resumed command of Visayas-Mindanao force and USFIP commander General Wainwright's order to surrender, ordered all combat operations of Cebu Brigade cease and surrender on May 13, 1942.
