= Irvine Scudder =

United States Army Colonel

Irvine C. Scudder
- Native name: Irvine Callander Scudder
- Born: October 9, 1895; Mississippi
- Died: April 4, 1950 (aged 54)
- Buried: Arlington National Cemetery, Arlington, Virginia
- Allegiance: United States of America
- Branch: United States Army
- Rank: Colonel
- Commands: Cebu Brigade, Visayan Force
- Awards: Silver Star; Legion of Merit
- Education: Virginia Military Institute
- Spouse: Hazel Jones Scudder

Irvine C. Scudder (1895–1950) is a retired United States Army Colonel who fought both World War I in France and World War II in the Philippines. He is best known as the commander of Filipino-American troops in Cebu Island from January 5, 1941, until ordered surrendered on May 12, 1942. He is both recipient of US Silver Star and Legion of Merit for his action as commander of Cebu Brigade. He was a POW and was released in Mukden POW camp in Manchuria in 1945.

== Education ==
Scudder is a non-graduating member of the United States Military Academy's class of June 1918.

== World War II ==
He was sent to the Philippines in 1941 and attached to 81st Infantry Division in the Island of Cebu. After 81st Division was ordered transferred to Mindanao Island to booster its defense. He was left in command of the island with two Philippine Army Infantry regiments and MP Regiment. The defense of island was boosted after the arrival of Brigadier General Bradford Chynoweth to established the new command Visayan Force to control all forces in the Visayas.

The Japanese invaded Cebu on April 12, 1942, and it took them only 3 days to control the island and neutralized its defending forces despite Chynoweth and Scudder's forces best efforts. With superior in all aspect numbers, weapons, and tactics Cebu Brigade was overwhelmed and retreated in Cebu Sierra Madre Mountains. Scudder was ordered to surrender on May 12, 1942, and became prisoner of war and was taken to island of Luzon. All senior officers were taken to Manchuria and incarcerated there at the remainder of the war. They were released in 1945 and returned to United States for rest and recuperation.

He retired as Colonel in 1946 and died in 1950, he was survived by his widow Hazel Jones Scudder who died in 1995 and two children.

== See also ==
- Cebu Brigade
- Visayan Force
- Japanese Invasion of Cebu
