= Cebu Brigade =

- Cebu Brigade, Visayan Force
- Active: January–May 1942
- Disbanded: May 12, 1942
- Countries: United States of America; Philippine Commonwealth
- Branch: Army, Air Corps, Navy
- Type: Infantry
- Role: Territorial defense
- Size: 6,500
- Part of: Visayan Force; Visayas-Mindanao Force
- Garrison/HQ: Camp Lapulapu, Lahug, Cebu
- Engagements: Battle of Toledo Battle of Talisay; Battle of Mandaue Battle of Cebu

Commanders
- Notable commanders: Colonel Irvine Scudder

Cebu Brigade is a military unit and formation organized in January 1942 by Visayas-Mindanao Force to defend the island of Cebu after ordering 81st Infantry Division Headquarters moved to Mindanao to bolster its defenses. USAFFE and later USFIP saw the island vital for the transport of the supplies to Bataan and Corregidor. Colonel Irvine Scudder was appointed as its commander until its surrender to Japanese.

Visayan Force was organized under Brigadier General Bradford Chynoweth which Cebu Brigade will be under its command except for the Army Transport Service who is under the direct command of USAFFE later USFIP. The Force whose headquarters also located in Cebu island at Camp X in Cantabaco, share its defenses to ensure orders are reaching to different island garrisons.

Main mission of the Brigade is to defense Lahug field and the Army Transport Service Facility in Cebu Harbor. Same problem with other island garrisons of Visayas lack of ammunitions, no artillery pieces, no coastal and antiaircraft guns, and limited supplies.

== Brigade Staffs ==
Helping Colonel Scudder are his staffs mostly Americans and few Filipino army officers assistants. Captain William F. O'Connor is S1 Personnel, Captain Russell Cracraft is Intelligence Officer S2, Captain Ernest V. Jordan was S3 Operation but was absorbed by Visayan Force HQ, Captain William English was S4 Supply officer for the brigade.

Major James Cushing the engineer officer, Captain Harry Fenton as radio communication officer, and Major Floyd Hawks is the medical officer.

Communications Officer is Lieutenant Thomas F. O'Brien, USN. A demolition detachment is assigned to 1Leiutenant Frank E. Merchant

== Combat units ==
- 82nd Infantry Regiment (less 2nd Battalion) – Colonel Emigdio David, PA
  - HQ Battalion
  - 1st Battalion - Captain Daniel Iway
  - 3rd Battalion - Captain
  - Provisional Battalion - Captain
  - 1st Battalion 83rd Infantry - Lieutenant Colonel Arthur Grimes
- 83rd Infantry Regiment (Less 1st Battalion) – Col. Fortunato Borbon, PA | LCol. Rufus Rogers SMI)
  - HQ Battalion
  - 2nd Battalion - Captain Manson Sharp
  - 3rd Battalion
- 808th (Cebu) Military Police Regiment – LCol Howard Edmands, USA
- Eastern Sector – LCol. John D. Cook, USA

=== Japanese landings ===
On April 12, 1942, General Chynoweth ordered 1st Battalion, 83rd Infantry under Lieutenant Colonel Arthur Grimes to transfer from Bohol to Cebu to cover the Cantabaco. On April 16, 1942, Sakaguchi Detachment landed in simultaneous effect on both west and east coasts of the southern part of Cebu. First group landed in Bato, Pinamungajan and Second group landed in Sibonga and Talisay.

1st Battalion, 82nd Infantry under Major Daniel Iway deployed by Colonel David to defend in Toledo and prevent Japanese drive towards Cantabaco. Visayan Force operations officer Major Ernest V. Jordan moved to San Fernando to thwart Japanese landing in the town. However, Japanese had withdrawn and landed in Talisay, where Cebu MP Regiment under LCol. Howard Edmands met them. With only M2 Browning .50 Caliber Heavy Machinegun and limited ammunition as its heaviest arm his men was not able to stop the Japanese. Due to air and naval fire support Colonel Edmands men retreated towards Cebu City. He ordered the Naval detachment under LCmdr Slimmons, USN in-charge of demolition in Mactan island to start the demolition of the facility to prevent capture of the enemy. Two companies of MPs who was posted in Mactan island crossed back to Cebu main island after the demolition.

Small Japanese units landed in Cebu City Peir 1 and Mandaue where sporadic fighting ensued on the streets and town center. Japanese was able to capture Cebu Hospital and Cebu Normal School where they setup its headquarters.

Colonel Scudder and his men retreated towards Sudlon and Tabunan in Cebu Sierra Madre Mountains. Lieutenant Colonel Grimes moved forward to verify the Japanese location and check the location of his battalion. He was never heard of him after he moved forward. General Chynoweth still confident the demolition charges will explode on the specified time. 83rd Infantry Regiment now under LCol. Rufus Rogers who was posted in the northern town of Liloan sent two companies as ordered to reinforce the Cantabaco front. However, due to no availability transport vehicles it moved slowly and before it reaches its objective it was recalled. This was the moment when Chynoweth realized his order is miscarried and ordered his headquarters withdraw to a trail towards Sudlon.

=== Disintegration ===
On April 19, after Cebu island is lost and could not communicate with Visayan Force HQ who also retreated towards Sudlon. General Wainwright ordered General Sharp to reconstitute the Visayas-Mindanao Force and take command of all remaining garrisons in the Visayas islands as Chynoweth was confined only in Cebu and could no longer function his responsibilities.

=== Surrender ===
After Visayas-Mindanao Force sent order to surrender and sent emissaries from Mindanao to Cebu to confer with Colonel Scudder and General Chynoweth of Sharp's order. Chynoweth ordered all forces in Cebu to surrender to the Japanese.

== See also ==
- Visayan Force
- 81st Infantry Division
- Visayas-Mindanao Force
