= 81st Division (Philippines) =

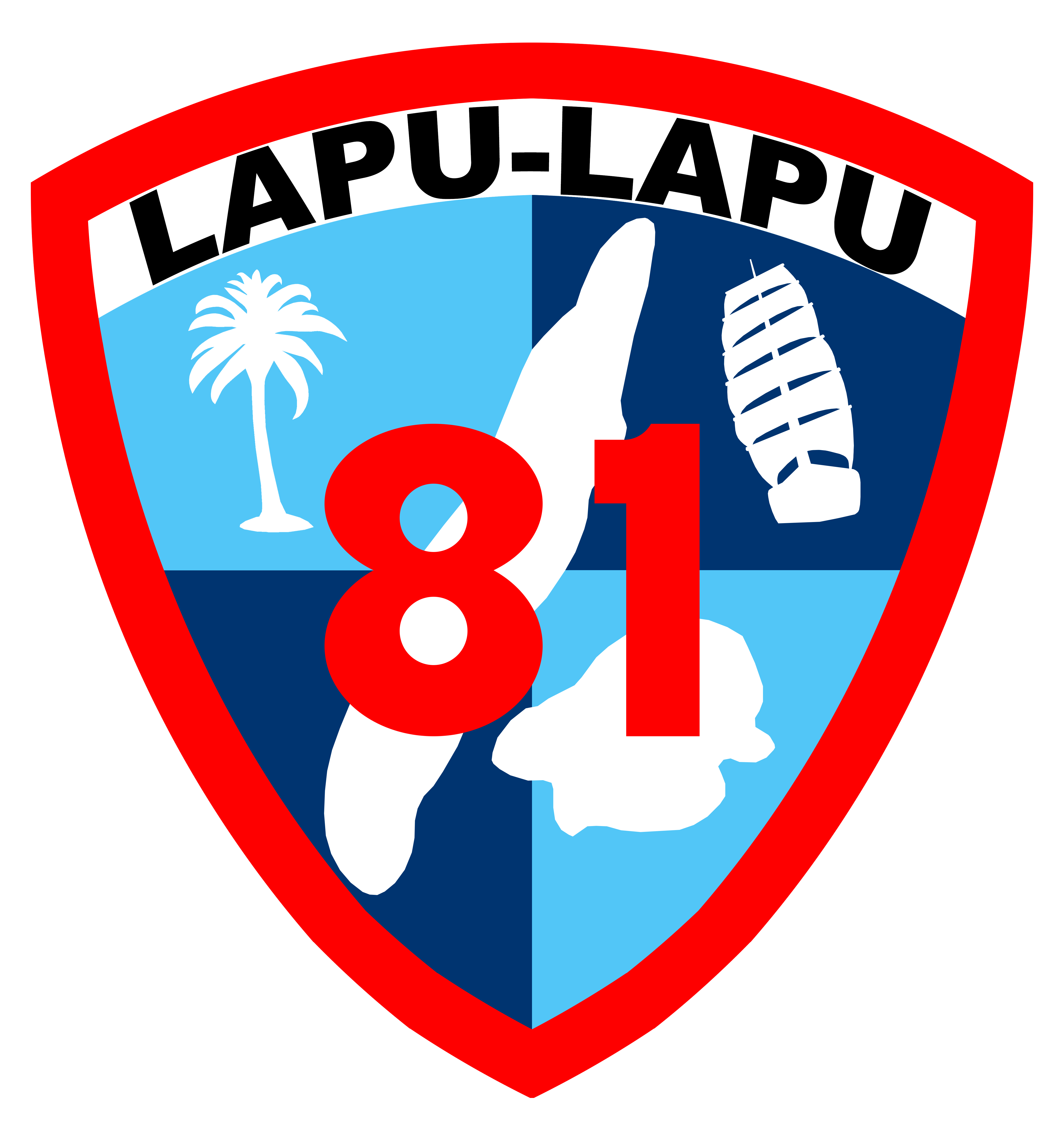
- 81st Philippine Division Emblem 1941-42
- Active: 1941 - 10 May 1942
- Country: Commonwealth of the Philippines
- Allegiance: Philippine Commonwealth Army
- Branch: Army
- Type: Infantry Division
- Role: Infantry
- Size: 7,000
- Part of: Mindanao Force; Visayas-Mindanao Force
- Garrison/HQ: Camp Kiethley, Dansalan (Marawi), Lanao; Carmen, Bohol
- Engagements: World War II: Philippines campaign (1941–1942)

Commanders
- Commander: Col. (later BGen.) Guy O. Fort
- Chief of Staff: LCol. Calixto Duque; Lieutenant Colonel Floyd Forte
- Personnel Staff: Aide de Camp - Maj Floyd Forte
- General Staffs: G3 Operations - Maj Dominador Garcia; G4 Supply - Maj Lawrence Pritchard
- Support Staffs: Finance - Lieutenant Robert Platt Medical - Lieutenant Colonel Barnes Surgeon - Major Heidger
- Notable commanders: Brigadier General Guy O. Fort

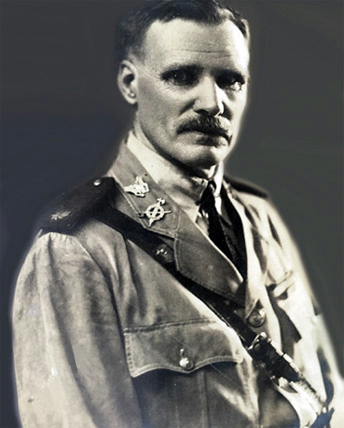
Col. (later BGen.) Guy O. Fort commander of 81st Infantry Division. He was tortured and executed after refusing to be used to encourage soldiers to surrender.

The 81st Infantry Division was a reserve division of the Philippine Army under the United States Army Forces in the Far East (USAFFE). It was established in the prewar period and fought 1941–1942. Its troops are from Cebu, Bohol, and Leyte but most of its troops are Americans and junior officers are Filipinos coming mostly from Luzon. The division served in defense of Mindanao but it never commanded the 4 of its maneuver regiments but was supplemented with 61st Infantry from Panay and 73rd Infantry from Negros. Also, 2nd Regular Regiment was transferred to its command in the early part of Japanese invasion of Mindanao.

== Organization ==
- 81st Infantry Regiment (PA) (commander, Ruperto Kangleon) (transferred to Mindanao but in Agusan sector)|LCol. Arden Boellnel | LCol. William Van Norstrand
  - 1st Battalion - Capt. Luis Dator | Capt. John S. Winer
  - 2nd Battalion - Capt Segundo Velasco
  - 3rd Battalion - Capt Tiburcio Bancaras | Maj Joseph Stensland
- 82nd Infantry Regiment (PA) - (left in Cebu) Col. Emigdio David
  - 1st Battalion - Capt Mariano Rafols
  - 2nd Battalion - Captain Luis Jakosalem (Deployed in Davao in December 1941, stayed until surrender) | Major Alvin T. Wilson | Major Frank McGee (Ret.)
  - 3rd Battalion - Captain Olegario Baura
  - Provisional Battalion - Major Daniel Iway
- 83rd Infantry Regiment (PA) - (left in Cebu) Col. Fortunato Borbon | LCol. Rufus H. Rogers
  - 1st Battalion - LCol. Arthur Grimes, USA (Initially defending Bohol later transferred to Cebu)
  - 2nd Battalion - Maj. Manson Sharp
  - 3rd Battalion - Maj. Edward McClenahan
- 81st Field Artillery Regiment (PA) (LCol. John P. Woodbridge) (Moved to Mindanao and attached to 102nd Division)
  - HQ Company
  - 1st Bn/81st FA Regt (PA) (75mm guns, 8x) (guns & ammunition never arrived; sunk on the SS Corregidor, 17 Dec 1941)
  - 2nd Bn/81st FA Regt (PA) (3-inch guns, 6x) (guns & ammunition never arrived; sunk on the SS Corregidor, 17 Dec 1941)
  - 3rd Bn/81st FA Regt (PA)
- 81st Engineer Battalion (PA) - Capt Jose Hidalgo | Capt Albert H. Price
- 81st Medical Battalion (PA) - Lieutenant Colonel Barnes
- 81st Division Units (PA)
  - 81st Division Headquarters & HQ Company (PA)
  - 81st Medical Battalion (PA)
  - 81st Signal Company (PA)
  - 81st Quartermaster Company (Motorized) (PA)
  - 81st QM Transport Company (Truck) (PA)

== History ==
It was active from 1941 to 10 May 1942, whereupon it surrendered after entire defending forces in the Philippines surrendered. It was activated in Cebu, Bohol, and Southern Leyte. Colonel (later Brigadier General) Guy O. Fort (PA) a long time PC officer was appointed as division commander in November 1941, and was later tortured and executed by the Japanese, apparently because he would not comply with their frustrated attempts to use him for propaganda in Mindanao.

The 81st Division was known as utilizing the Moro Bolo Battalions that their use of the bolo, a machete-like tool.

=== Organization ===
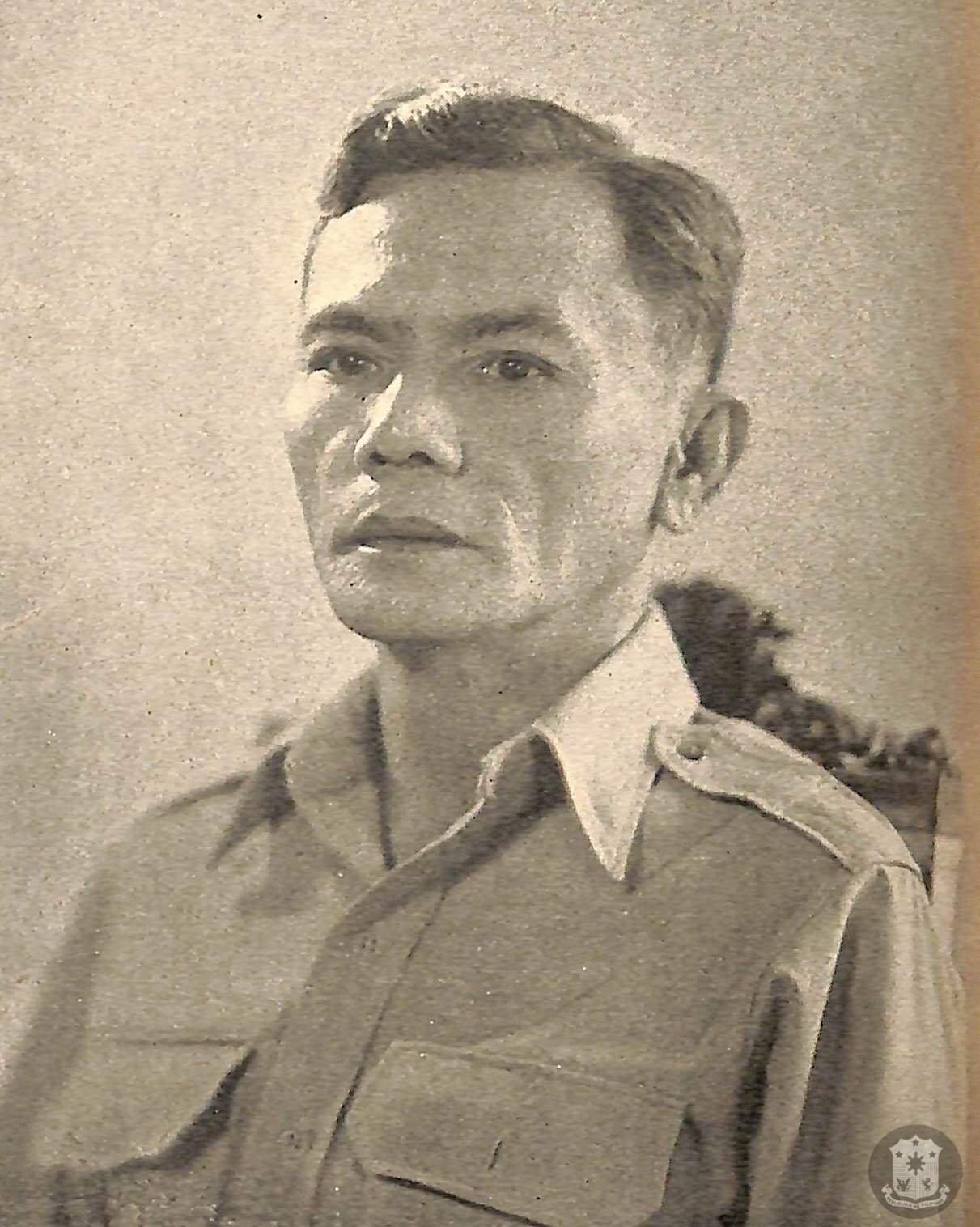
Lieutenant Colonel Ruperto Kangleon, first commander of 81st Infantry Regiment.

After the Japanese invasion of the Philippines in December 1941, it formed part of Visayas-Mindanao Force under Brigadier General (later Major General) William F. Sharp, HQ originally at Cebu City and later in Camp X in Toledo located in central in Cebu. 81st Infantry was relocated in Southern Leyte under Lieutenant Colonel Ruperto Kangleon, to form the Samar Brigade after 91st Infantry Division was shifted to Luzon in September 1941. 82nd Infantry Regiment under Lieutenant Colonel Emigdio David located in Pinamungajan in southern Cebu and held its training in Tubigon, Bohol where its 2nd Battalion under Major Arthur Grimes is organizing defense of entire Bohol island. 83rd Infantry Regiment under Lieutenant Colonel Fortunato Borbon was located in the town of Medillin in Northern Cebu, 81st Field Artillery Regiment's guns didn't reached them as SS Corregidor carrying them sunk in Manila Bay when it hit a mine. It was to reorganized to fight as infantry under Lieutenant Colonel John M. Woodridge, USA.

Division staffs are organized by Captain Floyd Forte and took role as acting Chief of Staff. However, Lieutenant Colonel Calixto Duque took over as Division Chief of Staff in February 1942, Major Dominador Garcia is the G3 Operations. Lt. Col Barnes the division medical officer, Major Luther Heidger the division surgeon, 1Lt. Robert Pratt division finance officer, and 1Lt. Landis Doner, division quartermaster.

==== Transfer to Negros ====
Division Headquarters and support units was ordered to transfer to Negros, General Fort became the commander of the Island immediately after the transfer. Came under its command the 61st Infantry under Colonel Eugene H. Mitchell and 73rd Infantry under Lieutenant Colonel Robert Vesey.

==== Transfer to Mindanao ====
2nd Battalion 82nd Infantry under 1Lieutenant Luis Jakosalem was sent to Mindanao to augment the Davao subsector under Lieutenant Colonel Roger Hilsman in early December 1941, they are the first element to engaged Japanese forces. Upon transfer Major Alvin T. Wilson took over the command of the battalion and was assigned to the southern part covering the Daliao-Talomo-Matina road. They put up a stubborn resistance inflicting casualties to Sakaguchi Detachment. However, due to strong air and naval support they were pulled out and eventually have to retreat towards Bukidnon. Some went to inland and re-join other USAFFE units, later they were assigned under communication zone under Major Frank McGee who used to command 2nd Battalion 101st Infantry back in Davao City, the battalion wasn't able to re-join neither the regiment of the division.

In January 1942 General Fort along 81st Division Headquarters, 81st Engineer, and 81st Medical Battalion was ordered to Mindanao island and assigned in Lanao sector which General Fort assumed as sector commander. 2nd Regular Infantry Regiment under LCol Calixto Duque was absorbed into the division and 61st Infantry Regiment under LCol Eugene Mitchell from Panay and 73rd Infantry Regiment under LCol Robert Vessey was also brought along. There were no artillery unit in the division so it have to rely on the Field Artillery Detachment of Mindanao Force. Lacking its 3rd Infantry regiment, Fort organized 84th Infantry Regiment under Major Jay Navin made up of Moros, it was called Moro Bolo Battalion as they don't have rifles as weapon only Bolo and Kris.

81st Infantry Regiment was transferred to Agusan Sector and commanded by LCol Arden R. Boellner as Lieutenant Colonel Ruperto Kangleon was designated as Brigade executive officer. Later LCol. William Van Norstrand assumed command as Colonel Boellner was appointed as chief of staff of 102nd Division. 81st Field Artillery Regiment went to Mindanao Force reserve and later attached to 102nd Infantry Division. Remaining units of the division that remained in Cebu island, the 82nd Infantry and 83rd Infantry Regiments along with Cebu Military Police Regiment under Lieutenant Colonel Howard Edmands are organized as Cebu Brigade under Colonel Irvine Schudder.

== Combat narratives ==
=== Cotabato and Lanao landings ===
Kawaguchi Detachment of 18th Division IJA landed in both Parang town in Cotabato province and Malabang in Lanao Province. 2nd Regular Regiment under Lieutenant Colonel Calixto Duque to oppose landing in Parang, Cotabato but he was under 101st Infantry Division jurisdiction and 61st Infantry Regiment to oppose landing in Malabang. 2nd Regular Regiment gave formidable defense but had to withdraw to avoid being flank as units from 101st Division defending Davao-Cotabato road retreated. 61st Infantry in Malabang didn't fare to the more experienced and modern weapons of Japanese and have to withdraw. 2nd Regiment Regiment was transferred to General Fort's command upon its retreat to Lanao. LCol. Eugene Mitchell commander of 61st Infantry tried to mount another defensive lines but his troops are annihilated and have to withdraw and in the chaos he was captured. 73rd Infantry Regiment under Lieutenant Colonel Robert H. Vessey took over the fight in Dansalan and Iligan subsector. Took stragglers from 61st Infantry and constabularymen, preventing to Japanese from reaching Cagayan sector to link with Kawamura detachment.

=== Surrender ===
Division was still giving a good fight in Lanao sector when it was ordered by MGen. Sharp to surrender which General Fort reluctantly complied. General Sharp sent an emissary to ensure General Fort compliance in Lanao. It surrendered in Lanao but American and Filipino soldiers who refused to surrender went to the hills and started a guerilla warfare. Among them are LCol. Wendell Fertig in Lanao area and Col. Ruperto Kangleon who went back Leyte after escaping and established his own guerilla unit there.

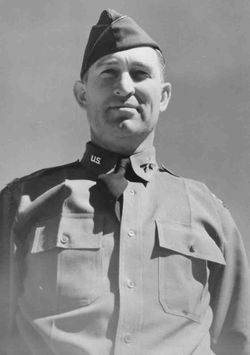
Lieutenant Colonel Rufus Rodgers replaced Lieutenant Colonel Borbon as commander of 83rd Infantry Regiment in April 1942. After Borbon was selected as executive officer of Cebu Brigade.

Majority of the 81st Division went through Mindanao death march where POWs were forced to marched from Camp Keithely in Dansalan to Camp Overton in Iligan without food, water, and sick. After two days they were shipped to Cagayan de Oro and trucked to Camp Casisang in Malaybalay, Bukidnon.

General Guy O. Fort was executed by Japanese when he refused to convince his soldiers who went to mountains to fight as guerillas to surrender.

== Order of Battle January - May 1942 ==
=== Visayas Force ===
- Cebu Brigade - Colonel Irvine Schudder
  - 82nd Infantry Regiment - Lieutenant Colonel Emigdio David
    - 1st Battalion - Captain Mariano Rafols | Francisco Solis
    - 3rd Battalion - Captain Olegario Baura
    - Provisional Battalion - Captain Daniel Iway
  - 83rd Infantry Regiment - Lieutenant Colonel Rufus Rodgers
    - HQ Battalion - Captain Eutiguio O. Achacoso
    - 1st Battalion - Lieutenant Colonel Arthur Grimes (Initially in Bohol sector but was transferred to Bohol to secure Cantabaco)
    - 2nd Battalion - Major Manson Sharp
    - 3rd Battalion - Major Edward McClenahan

=== Mindanao Force ===
==== Lanao Sector ====
- 73rd Infantry Regiment - LCol Robert Vesey, USA (added in Mindanao)
  - 1st Battalion - Capt Albert Chase
  - 2nd Battalion - Capt Jack M. Laro
  - 3rd Battalion - Capt. John Stephens
- 61st Infantry Regiment (PA) (Col. Eugene Mitchell) (added in Mindanao from Panay Island)
  - 1st Battalion - Maj Sam Jones | Major Moran
  - 2nd Battalion - Maj Clyde Childress | Capt Harry Harding Jr
  - 3rd Battalion - Maj Ernest McLish
- 1st Battalion, 84th Provisional (Moro Bolo) Infantry Regiment (Maj. Jay Navin)(Formed in Mindanao) | Captain Mamalinta Lao
- 2nd Infantry (Regular) Regiment (PA) (LCol Calixto Duque) (initially attached 101st Division but attached to 81st Division during retreat to Lanao)
  - 1st Battalion
  - 2nd Battalion
- 81st Engineer Battalion (PA) Maj. Leopoldo Regis
- 81st Medical Battalion
- Field Artillery Battery (4x QF 2.95inch Mountain Guns) - Captain Jose Hidalgo | Captain Albert H. Price
- 81st Division Units (PA)
  - 81st Division Headquarters & HQ Company (PA)
  - 81st Signal Company (PA)
  - 81st Quartermaster Company (Motorized) (PA) - Captain Charles Hedgesm
  - 81st QM Transport Company (Truck) (PA)
- Moro Bolo Battalions - Major Busran Kalaw
- PC Battalion - Lieutenant Colonel T.N Naidas, P.C

==== Cagayan Sector ====
- 81st Field Artillery Regiment (assigned to 102nd Infantry Division in Cagayan Sector) - Lieutenant Colonel John Woodridge
  - 1st Battalion
  - 2nd Battalion
  - 3rd Battalion

==== Agusan Sector ====
- 81st Infantry Regiment (Assigned to Samar Brigade in Agusan sector) - Lieutenant Colonel Arden Boellner
  - 1st Battalion - Capt John Miner
  - 2nd Battalion - Capt. Albert Price
  - 3rd Battalion - Capt. Trinidad

==== Communication Zone ====
- 2nd Battalion, 82nd Infantry (Assigned to Communication Zone) - Major Frank McGee

== Post War ==
81st Infantry Division was not immediately reactivated after the war. It was however reactivated as Standby Reserve division under the Philippine Army Reserve Command in 1996 and moved its headquarters in Camp Downes in Ormoc City in Leyte Island.

== Notables Soldiers ==
- Calixto Duque - later became AFP Chief of Staff few years after the war
- Louis D. Barnes - Division Medical Officer died in Hell Ship 1945.
- Guy O. Fort - Division Commander and was executed in Dansalan for refusing to collaborate with the Japanese.
- Fortunato Borbon - Became Governor of Batangas right after World War II 1945 to 1946
- Manuel Segura - Retired as PC Colonel and authored books Tabunan and Koga Papers.
- James Cushing - commanded guerillas in Cebu Area Command until War ended.
- Ruperto Kangleon - Secretary of National Defense 1946 to 1949.
- Dominador Garcia - Became a brigadier general and Chief of Constabulary in 1964.
- Mohammad Ali Dimaporo - Congressman (1950s and 90s), Lanao del Norte Governor (1960 - 1965), Lanao del Norte Governor (1976 - 1986)

== Sources ==
- Morton, Louis (1989) [1953]. The Fall of the Philippines. Washington, D.C.: US Government Printing Office. ISBN 9780160018909. LCCN 53-63678.
- Whitman, John W. (1990). Bataan: Our Last Ditch: The Bataan Campaign, 1942. Hippocrene Books. ISBN 0-87052-877-7.
