= Kiyotake Kawaguchi =

Japanese general (1892–1961)

- 川口 清健
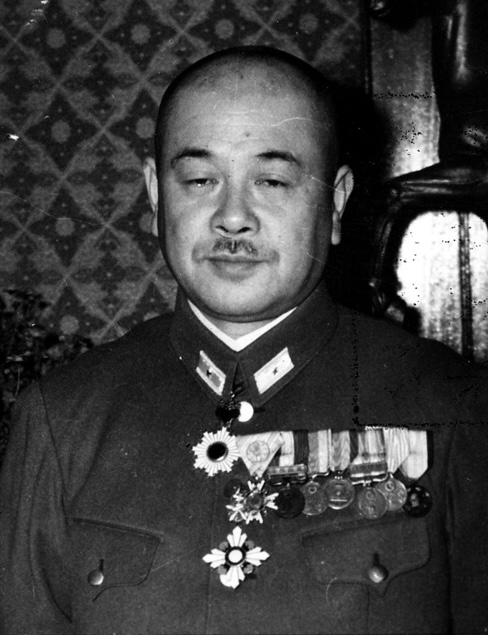
- Born: 3 December 1892; Kōchi, Japan
- Died: 16 May 1961 (aged 68)
- Education: Imperial Japanese Army Academy; Army Staff College
- Military career
- Allegiance: Empire of Japan
- Branch: Imperial Japanese Army
- Service years: 1914–1945
- Rank: Major general
- Units: North China Area Army; Southern Army
- Commands: IJA 35th Infantry Brigade
- Conflicts: Second Sino-Japanese War; World War II; Battle of the Philippines; Guadalcanal campaign; Battle of Edson's Ridge; Battle for Henderson Field

Kiyotake Kawaguchi (川口 清健, Kawaguchi Kiyotake; 3 December 1892 – 16 May 1961) was a general in the Imperial Japanese Army during World War II.

== Biography ==
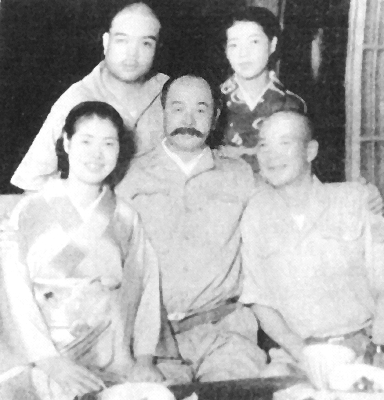
Kawaguchi (center) with friends in an undated photograph

A native of Kōchi Prefecture, Kiyotake graduated from the 26th class of the Imperial Japanese Army Academy in 1914, and from the 34th class of the Army Staff College in 1922. He spent much of the 1920s and 1930s in a series of staff positions in the North China Area Army and in Japan, before his promotion to major general in 1940.

In 1940, Kawaguchi was appointed commander of the IJA 35th Infantry Brigade. This was under the direct command of the Southern Army and was formed from units from the IJA 18th Division. Kawaguchi's reinforced brigade made a series of landings in British Borneo in December 1941 and January 1942: at Miri, Kuching, Brunei, Jesselton, Beaufort, Labuan Island and Sandakan. During the later stages of the Japanese occupation of the Philippines, it landed at Cebu in March 1942 and Mindanao the following month. As commander of Army forces on Cebu after the invasion of the Philippines in 1942, Kawaguchi objected strenuously to the "revenge killings" of senior Philippine government officials and supreme court justices by Japanese authorities, most notably Japanese Army Colonel Masanobu Tsuji. He argued that, "shooting defeated opponents in cold blood was a violation of the true Bushido." His protests earned him the enmity of Tsuji, who used every opportunity to get Kawaguchi reassigned to combat zones from which he was not likely to return.

Kawaguchi and his 35th Infantry Brigade, along with other attached units, were landed as reinforcements on Guadalcanal in August and September 1942 in response to the Allied landings on the island. In the resulting Battle of Edson's Ridge on 13 September 1942, Kawaguchi's forces were defeated with heavy losses and forced to retreat from the battlefield. Kawaguchi was subsequently relieved of command during the Japanese preparations for another attack in October 1942 and evacuated from the island and back to Japan.

Kawaguchi was relegated to the reserve list in 1943. After recovering from a long illness, he was placed in command of the defenses of Tsushima Island in March 1945.

After the surrender of Japan, Kawaguchi was transferred to the Philippines to face the military tribunal of the Philippine Army for war crimes committed in Lanao province. He pleaded guilty and was sentenced to six years imprisonment on November 14, 1949. On July 4, 1953, President Elpidio Quirino pardoned all the remaining Japanese war criminals under Philippine jurisdiction.

Kawaguchi died in Japan in 1961.
