= Manuel F. Segura =

- Born: January 1, 1919; Cebu, Philippine Islands
- Died: November 27, 2013 (aged 94); Manila, Philippines
- Burial place: Libingan ng mga Bayani, Taguig, Metro Manila
- Military career
- Allegiance: Philippines
- Branch: Philippine Constabulary; Philippine Army
- Service years: 1941-1972
- Rank: Colonel
- Nickname: Maning
- Unit: Visayas PC Command Cebu PC District 82nd Infantry Regiment
- Conflicts: World War II

Manuel Felimon Segura (January 1, 1919 – November 27, 2013) was a colonel of the Armed Forces of the Philippines with assigned serial number 0-3547 AFP. He was G-1 and adjutant general in the General Headquarters of the Cebuano guerrillas during World War II, with Col. James M. Cushing as his commanding officer. Segura wrote at least two books on the guerrilla story in Cebu.

== Early life and prewar service ==
Segura was a student in the University of the Philippines, Diliman campus, when the clouds of war loomed over the Pacific in the early months of 1941. On 28 August 1941, he was called to active duty as a 3rd lieutenant, Infantry, and assigned as regimental adjutant of 82nd Infantry Regiment, 81st Infantry Division, Philippine Commonwealth Army.

He happened to be in Cebu when the war broke out. According to his own accounts, he chose resistance instead of surrender.

== Guerrilla stint ==
He was assigned in the Cebu Central Sector as combat officer and S-3 (Plans and Training Officer). He was involved in several attacks against Japanese garrisons at Talisay, Minglanilla, Carcar and Toledo, mostly against the Toledo garrison that was near the sector's headquarters at Pandong Bato, Toledo; including the big battles at Lawa-an, Minglanilla where 55 Japanese were killed; the big battle of Babag Ridge that lasted 10 days and 10 nights where 650 Japanese were killed; the big battle at Malubog, Toledo where 750 Japanese were killed. In the skirmishes in Cebu a total of 11,898 Japanese were killed in 119 encounters and ambushes.

Before the end of the war he was assigned as G-l and adjutant general in the General Headquarters at Tabunan. For his bravery, he was awarded by the United States of America the Bronze Star Medal with "V" Device for Heroism in Ground Combat and ended the war as a major subjects.

== Post-war ==
For the next ten years after the war Segura was provincial commander in the following provinces: Southern Leyte, Romblon, Negros Oriental, and Bohol. He retired from active duty on January 1, 1972. He died on November 27, 2013, in Manila, where he fell ill while attending a conference. He died due to complications from pneumonia.

== List of awards and badges ==
Segura earned a total of 24 badges and awards during his stay in the army:

- Military Merit Medal with four Bronze Anahaw Leaves (five-time MMM awardee)
- U.S. Bronze Star Medal with "V" Device for Heroism in Ground Combat
- Distinguished Unit Citation with 2 Bronze Oak Leaf Clusters
- American Defense Service Medal with Clasp (for Foreign Service)
- Asiatic-Pacific Campaign Medal with 4 Bronze Combat Stars
- World War II Victory Medal
- Philippine Defense Ribbon with 1 Bronze Combat Star
- Philippine Liberation Ribbon with 2 Bronze Combat Stars
- Philippine Independence Ribbon
- Long Service Medal with 1 bronze Star
- Anti-Dissidence Campaign Medal
- Philippine Republic Presidential Unit Citation
- Combat Infantryman Badge
- AFP Parachute Badge with Star
- U.S. Basic Parachute Badge
- American Campaign Medal

== Books ==
- TABUNAN: The Untold Story of the Famed Cebu Guerillas of World War II (1975), Col. Manuel F. Segura, excerpts hosted by the Cebu Eskrima Society
- The Koga Papers: Stories of World War II in Cebu, Philippines (1992), Col. Manuel F. Segura
