= Ruperto Kangleon =

Filipino politician (1890–1958)

Colonel Ruperto C. Kangleón
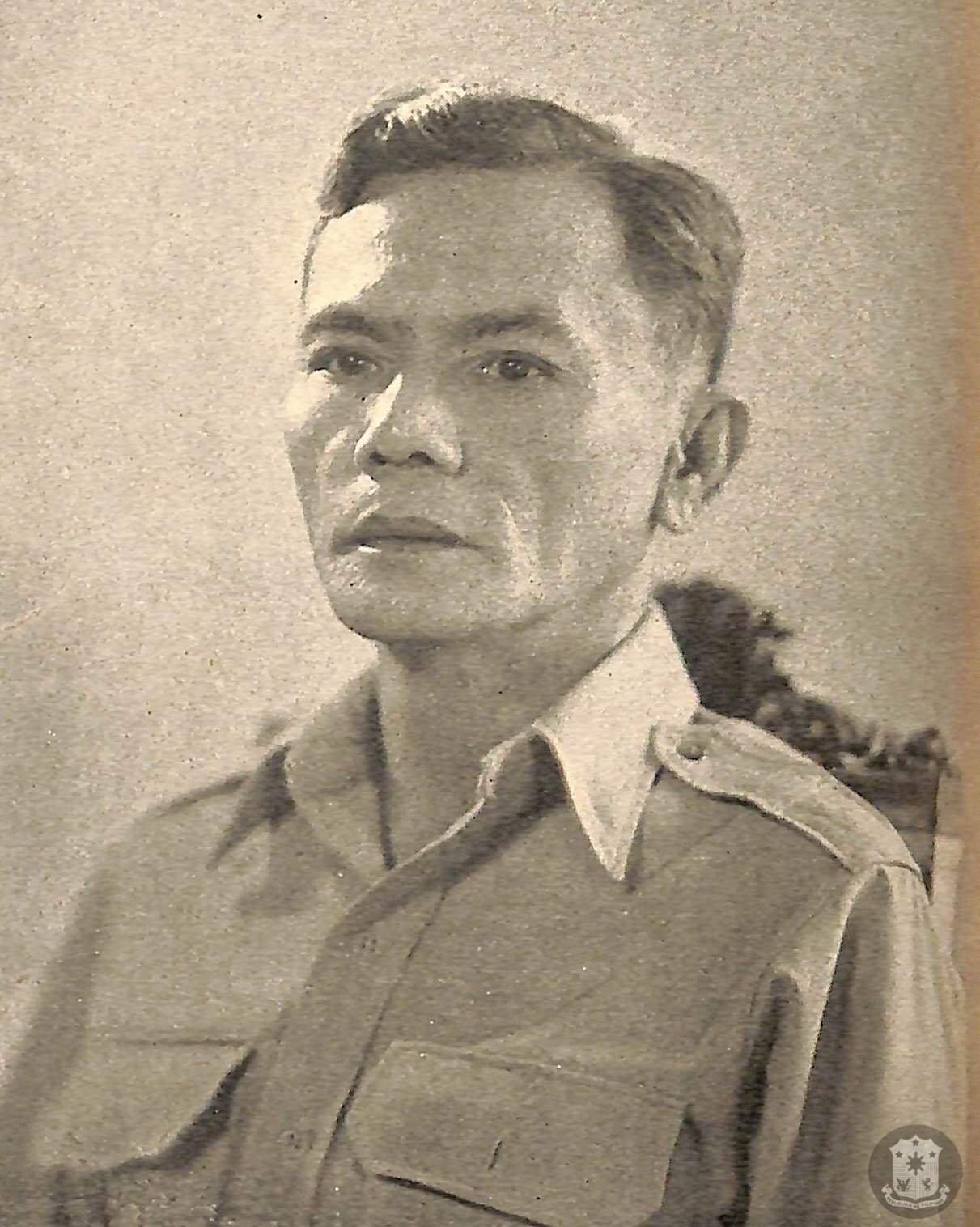
- Photograph from the Blue Book: First Anniversary of the Republic of the Philippines, published 1947

Senator of the Philippines
- In office December 30, 1953 – February 27, 1958

5th Secretary of National Defense
- In office May 28, 1946 – September 1, 1950
- President: Manuel Roxas; Elpidio Quirino
- Preceded by: Alfredo Montelibano Sr.
- Succeeded by: Ramon Magsaysay

Military Governor of Leyte
- In office October 23, 1944 – May 28, 1946
- Appointed by: Sergio Osmeña

Personal details
- Born: Ruperto Kangleón y Cadava; March 27, 1890 Macrohon, Leyte, Captaincy General of the Philippines
- Died: February 27, 1958 (aged 67) Manila, Philippines
- Party: Democratic (1953–1958)
- Other political affiliations: Liberal (1946–1953)
- Spouse: Valentina Tagle
- Children: 7
- Education: Philippine Constabulary Academy Class 1916

Military service
- Allegiance: Philippines; United States (until 1946)
- Branch/service: Philippine Army
- Years of service: 1916–1950
- Rank: Colonel
- Commands: 92nd Infantry Division, PA (1944–1946); Black Army (1942–1944); XO, Agusan Sector-Mindanao Force; 81st Infantry Regiment, PA
- Battles/wars: World War II; Philippines campaign (1941–1942); Philippines campaign (1944–1945); Battle of Leyte; Hukbalahap rebellion

Ruperto Cadava Kangleón (March 27, 1890 – February 27, 1958) was a Filipino military officer and politician. He was a native of the municipality of Macrohon in the province now named Southern Leyte.

Kangleón was the acknowledged leader of the Resistance Movement in Leyte during the Japanese occupation of the Philippines during World War II. As such, his guerrilla forces helped pave the way for the American Leyte Landings on their return to the Philippines in 1944.

Before the war, Colonel Kangleon was replaced and re-joining the group of soldiers under the pre-war 92nd Infantry Division of the Philippine Army in the General Headquarters in Leyte during the Liberation. And after the war, Ruperto Kangleon served as the Philippine Secretary of National Defense under Presidents Manuel Roxas and Elpidio Quirino.

== World War II ==
=== Military service ===
Kangleon was a former lieutenant colonel and was the commanding officer of the 81st Infantry Regiment of the 81st Division, USAFFE on 1942 with its headquarters in Cebu. The order came to proceed to Davao where he and his men valiantly fought the troops of the Japanese Imperial army during the Japanese Invasion and Occupation. He relinquished his command of 81st Infantry Regiment to LCol. Arden Boellner as he was appointed to be the executive officer of Agusan sector under Col. Benhur Chastaine. He was captured by the Japanese Imperial Army forces and was put to prison in the Japanese Internment Camps in Agusan. He managed to escape from prison in December 1942, and returned to Leyte, where he formed as a guerrilla movement. With the help of Iliff David Richardson, Kangleon was able to establish contact with Col. Wendell Fertig on Mindanao. Soon after the Battle of Baybay, against Miranda's guerrillas on 15 August 1943, Kangleon was able to consolidate and unite all forces on Leyte. Kangleon then moved his headquarters from Maasin to Don Lorenzo's Casa in Malitbog. In November 1943, under orders from Col. Fertig, Kangleon, Richardson, and other guerrilla leaders were in Mindanao to coordinate activities, and meet the submarine USS Narwhal delivering American aid. However, by then the Japanese had made the Casa, in Malitbog, their headquarters for southern Leyte. On 1 February 1944, Kangleon's forces went on the offensive, which included attacks on Japanese garrisons at Anahawan and Linoan, forcing the Japanese to not venture away from the coastal towns of southern Leyte.

=== Kangleon's Guerrillas ===
Kangleon's contribution to the war was the reason for his appointment to the defense portfolio. He led a number of guerrilla organizations, among the fiercest, with the greatest reach and had undertaken numerous operations against the Japanese Imperial Army in Visayas and sometimes in other islands. His forces were known as the Black Army.

The Black Army was the main force of Kangleon that led in the liberation of Leyte Island during the last phase of the war. The island served as the United States Army entry point into the Philippine Archipelago when the U.S. invaded and defeated the Japanese. One of the highlights of the ferocious battle against the Japanese Army was the raid on Camp Buga-Buga that was an extremely difficult objective to take. It was a huge network of camps entrenched in large caves that opened into the face of insurmountable cliffs in Southern Leyte.

=== Leyte Landing ===
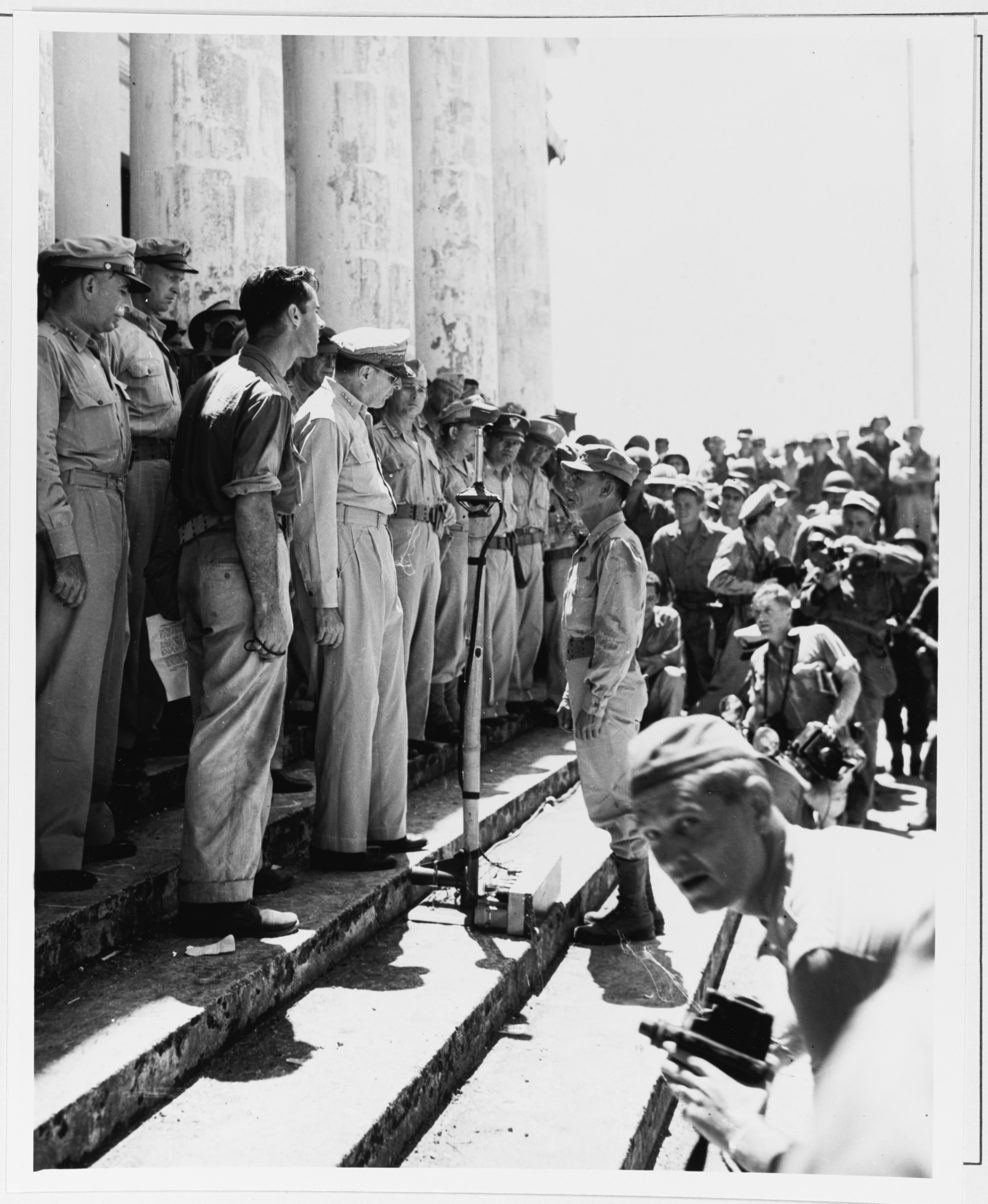
Col. Ruperto Kangleon reporting to General Douglas MacArthur.

When the Allies led by General Douglas MacArthur landed on Battle of Leyte, Kangleon's guerrillas assisted them and three days later, on 21 October 1944, Kangleon was recognized as the overall commander of guerrilla forces on Leyte, the 92nd Division. Gen. MacArthur personally pinned on Kangleon the Distinguished Service Cross of the United States of America, a decoration awarded for extraordinary heroism in combat witnessed by Philippine President Sergio Osmeña as well as commanders of the Army, Navy, and Air Force, at the Leyte provincial capitol building.

== Later career ==
=== Secretary of National Defense ===
Kangleon became Leyte's civil governor upon the re-establishment of the Philippine Commonwealth under President Osmeña. On May 28, 1946, he was appointed Secretary of National Defense by President Manuel Roxas, the first of the Commonwealth and the Republic of the Philippines, in the same way that Kangleon was the Defense Secretary during the closing American colonial rule and held the position upon the declaration of independence on July 4, 1946. But due to policy differences with the next president, Elpidio Quirino on the leadership of the Armed Forces of the Philippines, Kangleon resigned as Defense Secretary on August 31, 1950. Kangleon was trying to ask President Quirino to remove the generals whom he considered deadwood to which the President disagreed.

=== Senate ===
Kangleon's resignation from the Cabinet paved the way for his entry into the politics. Kangleon ran for Senate even without the endorsement of the incumbent President Quirino. He became senator and was appointed chairman of the Senate Committee on Veterans and Military Pensions and vice chairman of the Committee on National Defense and Security. He championed the cause of the Filipino veterans by filing bills and resolutions for their welfare and advancement. However, even before he could finish his six-year term in the Senate, Sen. Kangleon succumbed to myocardial infarction on February 27, 1958, exactly a month away from his 68th birthday.

The Filipino nation led by President Carlos P. Garcia mourned his untimely death. Sen. Kangleon was buried at the Manila South Cemetery on March 4, 1958, and was reinterred in his hometown of Macrohon, Leyte on February 27, 1994. President Fidel V. Ramos promoted Kangleon to Brigadier General of the Philippine Army posthumously in 1997.

== Memorials ==
- Camp Kangleon, regional headquarters of the Philippine National Police in Tacloban City, Leyte, is named after him.

== See also ==
- Department of National Defense (Philippines)
- List of American guerrillas in the Philippines
- List of Philippine legislators who died in office
