= Visayan Force =

US military unit during the Philippines Campaign (1941–1942)

- Lakas ng Islang Bisaya
- Visayas Forces
- Active: March 17, 1942 – April 19, 1942
- Disbanded: May 11, 1942
- Countries: United States of America; Philippine Commonwealth
- Allegiance: United States Army; Philippine Commonwealth Army
- Branch: Army, Navy, Army Air Corps
- Type: Infantry, quartermaster
- Role: Territorial defense
- Size: 30,000
- Part of: United States Forces in the Philippines
- Garrison/HQ: Camp X, Cantabaco, Cebu
- Motto: Baus Au (Get it back)
- Equipment: M1917 Engfield .30 Caliber Bolt Action Rifles, M1923 and M1928 Thompson .45 ACP Submachineguns, M2 Browning .30 Caliber Heavy Machineguns
- Engagements: Japanese invasion of Panay Japanese Invasion of Cebu Operation Baus Au

Commanders
- Notable commanders: Brigadier General Bradford G. Chynoweth, USA

The Visayan Force was a short-lived US military organization formed during the Philippines Campaign (1941–1942) of World War II. It was created chiefly from elements of the Visayas-Mindanao Force that were located on the Visayan Islands in the central Philippines and was activated on March 17, 1942, when General Douglas MacArthur departed for Australia. Its mission was to resist Japanese landings on the islands and prepare for ongoing guerilla warfare, but it suffered from a shortage of rifles and ammunition and from a complete lack of artillery. The Japanese invaded Cebu, the location of the Force's headquarters, on April 16 to 19, 1942. The headquarters lost contact with the other islands and General Wainwright ordered the Mindanao Force to take command of them. Eventually all forces in the Visayas were ordered to surrender on May 11, 1942, though some units evaded surrender and carried on as guerrillas.

== Background ==
On March 4, 1942, General Bradford G. Chynoweth, commander of the 61st Infantry Division in Panay, was told that the Visayas-Mindanao Force was to split into two separate commands and that he would command the Visayan Force with headquarters in Cebu. He was ordered to transfer to Cebu Island and take over the command of all garrisons in the Visayas Islands. He boarded a vessel for Negros accompanied by his aide Lieutenant Gordon Benson and by Major Dwight Deter, a medical officer. In Negros they took motor transport provided by Colonel Roger Hilsman, the commander on the island, which took them to board a small ferry that crossed the Tañon Strait and landed in Toledo, Cebu. They had just gotten off the ferry and were only a few meters away when a Japanese destroyer appeared and bombarded both Toledo and the port of San Carlos on Negros.

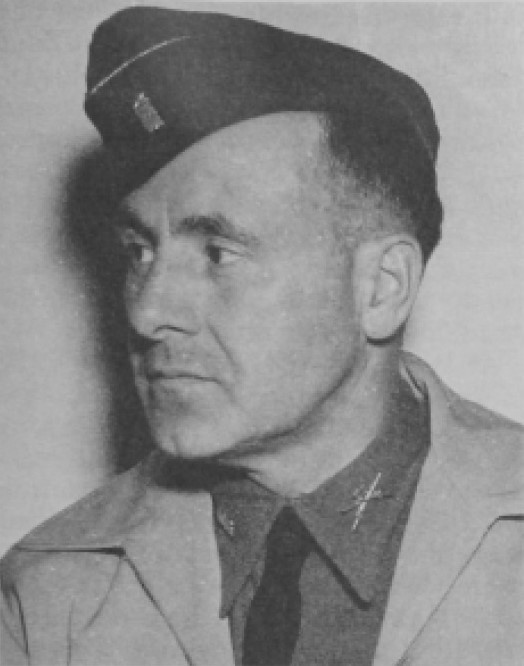
Brigadier General Bradford G. Chynoweth, the only commander of the Visayan Force from its creation to its surrender.

=== Headquarters and Staff ===
General Chynoweth set up his headquarters at Camp X in a Bureau of Forestry compound in Cantabaco, along the highway crossing central Cebu. He was promised officers from Luzon to fill his staff, but due to intensified Japanese naval and air activities in the Visayas Sea none arrived. He brought with him Major Dwight Deter, who was the 61st Division surgeon. Later Captain Thomas Powell Jr arrived after finishing construction of an airfield at Iloilo on Panay. Major James Cushing, a mining engineer before the war, became the engineering officer. Major Ernest V. Jordan, who had been the operations officer (S3) for the Cebu Brigade, took the same role on the Force staff. Captain Floyd Hawks, a medical officer, set up a field hospital in Camp X. In April General Bradford ordered Colonel Roger Hilsman Sr, the commander on Negros, to move to Cebu to act as his chief of staff.

- Chief of Staff - Colonel Roger Hilsman Sr (April 7 - 9, 1942)
- Aide de Camp - Lieutenant Gordon Benson
- HQ & HQ Battalion Commandant - Captain William Dilworth Miner
  - Camp X Communication Officer - Petty Officer Cecil E. Wilson, USN
  - Camp X Quartermaster - Captain Jens K. Jensen
- Adjutant and S1
- Intelligence S2 - Captain Duane Cosper
- Operations S3 - Major Ernest V. Jordan
- Supply S4 - Captain William R. English
- Quartermaster - Captain Leon Howell
- Artillery Officer
- Engineer Officer - Major James Cushing
  - Captain Henry Talmadge
- Finance Officer
- Medical Officer - Major Dwight Deter, MD
- Judge Advocate General
- Inspector General

== Organization and Units ==
=== Panay Force ===
The 61st Infantry Division in Panay, BG Chynoweth's former unit, was under the command of Brigadier General Albert F. Christie. Only the 63rd Infantry Regiment was left after the division's three other regiments had been moved to Mindanao. Consequently, two new infantry regiments were organized, the 64th and 65th, later renamed to 61st Provisional and 62nd Provisional, taking the numbers of the 61st and 62nd in Mindanao. The Panay Force had about 8,000 men.

=== Negros Force ===
When the 71st Infantry Division was ordered to Luzon on September 1, 1941, only the 73rd Infantry Regiment was left to defend the island. In January the 73rd was ordered to transfer to Mindanao, leaving no combat units on the island. Lieutenant Colonel Gabriel Gador, commander of the 7th Military District, took the initiative to organize two infantry regiments. The first of these, the 74th Provisional Infantry Regiment, was commanded by Major Sam Jones, who had been left behind by the 73rd for the purpose. Later the 75th Provisional Infantry Regiment was formed under Major Tiburcio Ballesteros, but it could not complete a 3rd battalion due to lack of weapons. VMF HQ sent former Davao Force commander Colonel Roger Hilsman to command in Negros. In April, Chynoweth ordered Hilsman to transfer to Cebu to take a new role as Visayan Force Chief of Staff so he could rest and recuperate from an illness. He ordered Colonel Carter McClennan from Panay to transfer to Negros to take command. The two infantry regiments, the 74th and the 75th, totaled 2,500 men.

=== Cebu Force ===
The Cebu Force under Colonel Irvine Schudder had the 808th Military Police Regiment under Lieutenant Colonel Howard Edmands, the 82nd Infantry Regiment (less 2nd Battalion) under Colonel Emigdio David, and the 83rd Infantry Regiment (less 1st Battalion) under Colonel Fortunato Borbon (later Lieutenant Colonel Rufus Rogers). These units comprised the Cebu Brigade. A small Navy detachment under Lt Commander Slimmons USN was based on Mactan Island near Cebu City. The defense of Cebu was crucial not just because the Visayan Force HQ was located there but also because it hosted the Army Transport Service and its facilities under Colonel John D. Cook, under the direct command of USFIP in Corregidor. Cebu had 6,500 personnel from the Army, Army Air Force, and Navy.

=== Bohol Force ===
The Bohol Force under Lieutenant Colonel Arthur Grimes had the 1st Battalion 83rd Infantry, the Bohol Philippine Constabulary Company under Captain Ismael Ingiñero, and volunteers. In April, Ingiñero took over the command of Bohol as Colonel Grimes was transferred by Chynoweth to Cebu to bolster the defense of Cantabaco on that island.

=== Samar-Leyte Force ===
Leyte and Samar islands were under Colonel Theodore Cornell. With the Samar Brigade gone to Mindanao to bolster its defense, he organized the Leyte Provisional Regiment under Lieutenant Colonel Juan Causing. Shortage of rifles and ammunitions and lack of artillery were the most pressing problems on these islands, as on all the others. The garrison consisted of 2,500 officers and men.

=== Operation Baus Au (Get it Back/Revenge) ===
While Chynoweth was commander of the 61st Division, he started Operation Baus Au, the name coming from a local term for "get back" or "revenge." It consisted of storing weapons, ammunitions, food, and supplies in the mountains so that his men could carry out a long guerilla campaign. When he arrived in Cebu he found that the defenses were not adequate and he wanted to implement Operation Baus Au in all garrisons in the Visayas Islands. He directed Colonel John D. Cook, commander of the Army Transport Service unit on Cebu, to move all food and other supplies into the mountains.

== Combat Narratives ==
After the capitulation of the Luzon Force in Bataan, the 14th Imperial Japanese Army under Lieutenant General Homma Masaharu trained its sights on the small island of Corregidor and was able to spare units for the Visayas and Mindanao. The Kawaguchi Detachment was to take Cebu and the Kawamura Detachment under Major General Kawamura was to invade Panay. As soon as these detachments secured those islands, the 10th Independent Garrison would take over and make both detachments available for the invasion of Mindanao.

=== Cebu landings ===
In April 9, the Kawaguchi Detachment landed in the southern parts of Cebu island: Pinamungajan on the west coast, Sibonga and Talisay on the east coast. The detachment moved towards the central part of the island where Camp X was located. The 82nd Infantry Regiment (less 2nd Battalion) under Colonel Emigdio David, which was located in Argao, fought the Japanese on both coasts. The 1st Battalion 83rd Infantry under Lieutenant Colonel Arthur Grimes, which had been moved from Bohol a few days ago to cover Talisay and prevent a Japanese drive to Cantabaco, was tasked to repulse any advance by the Japanese, but the battalion was not able to get in position as ordered and Colonel Grimes was killed in an ambush while reconnoitering the area. After realizing that the island defense plan was not working, that the Japanese would reach Camp X in few hours, and that the 83rd Infantry Regiment in Liloan north of Cebu City had failed to send reinforcements to Cantabaco on time, Chynoweth ordered a withdrawal to the mountains of the Cebu Sierra Madre. After this Chynoweth lost contact with all units in other islands, so General Wainwright on April 19, 1942, ordered General Sharp in Mindanao to reconstitute the Visayas-Mindanao Force to command the other garrisons in the Visayas.

=== Panay landings ===
The Kawamura detachment left Lingayen, Pangasinan, and landed on Panay at three different points on April 16, 1942. General Christie did not put up a fight on the beaches due to lack of coast artillery and ammunition. The 61st Division was very well stocked in their mountain retreat and could operate from there. His troops resorted to ambuscades and nightly raids in Iloilo City, San Jose town in Antique province, and Capiz province. The Japanese 10th Independent Garrison relieved the detachment and allowed it to prepare for Mindanao. With the seizure of Panay and Cebu, combat operations in the Visayas were practically over.

=== Surrender ===
On May 10, 1942, orders from the Visayas-Mindanao Force headquarters in Bukidnon were received by all garrison commanders on Panay, Negros, Cebu, Bohol, and Leyte-Samar. Colonel Christie was skeptical of the order, as Sharp had no authority over the Visayas Force. Some Filipino unit commanders questioned the order, as General Wainwright was now a POW and he had ordered it under duress. General Sharp sent Colonel Allen Thayer to Panay and Lieutenant Colonel Jessie Traywick to Negros to ensure that his order would be followed. On May 12, all units and garrisons in the Visayas Islands ceased their operations. However, not all units surrendered. Lieutenant Colonel Macario Peralta led guerilla forces in Panay. Majors Salvador Abcede and Ernesto Mata led guerilla warfare in Negros. Lieutenant Colonel James Cushing led a guerilla movement in Cebu. Lieutenant Colonel Ruperto Kangleon escaped prison in Mindanao and travelled back to Leyte to start guerilla warfare. All the American soldiers who surrendered were moved to Palawan or to Luzon. Healthy ones were transferred to Japan and the sickly prisoners were incarcerated in a POW camp in Cabanatuan, Luzon.

== Post-War ==
The Philippine Army did not reactivate the Visayas Force. However, the Armed Forces of the Philippines (AFP) activated Visayas Command in the 1980s to command Army, Navy, and Air Forces units in the Visayas Islands, with headquarters at Camp Lapulapu, Cebu. It was renamed Central Command in 2000, but returned to Visayas Command (Viscom) in 2021. It is led by a three-star officer.

== See also ==
- Luzon Force
- Mindanao Force
- AFP Visayas Command
- Manuel F. Segura (S1 of 82nd Infantry Regiment based in Camp Bato, Argao)
- Bradford G. Chynoweth, CG Visayan Force
- Macario Peralta, S3 of 61st Division, led guerilla warfare in Panay. Appointed as Deputy Chief of Staff and promoted to Brigadier General. He later appointed as Secretary of National Defense in 1961 – 1964 under President Diosdado Macapagal.
