= Guy Fort =

US Army officer

Guy O. Fort
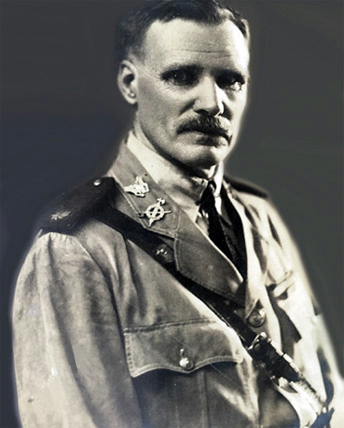
- Born: January 27, 1879; Traverse City, Michigan, U.S.
- Died: November 11, 1942 (aged 63) Marawi, Mindanao, Japanese-occupied Philippines
- Cause of death: Execution by firing squad
- Allegiance: United States; Commonwealth of the Philippines
- Branch: United States Army; Philippine Army
- Service years: 1899–1942
- Rank: Brigadier General
- Service number: O952305
- Commands: 81st Division (Philippines); Philippine Constabulary
- Conflicts: Philippine–American War; Moro Rebellion; World War II; Pacific War; Philippines campaign (1941–1942) (POW); Japanese invasion of Malabang; Japanese occupation of the Philippines (executed)
- Awards: Army Distinguished Service Medal; Purple Heart; Prisoner of War Medal; American Defense Service Medal; World War II Victory Medal; Asiatic–Pacific Campaign Medal; Philippine Defense Medal
- Spouses: Marguerite E. Fort, died 1927; Mary Angeles Adams, died 1941

Guy O. Fort (January 1, 1879 – November 11, 1942) was a brigadier general in the Philippine Army under the control of the United States Army Forces in the Far East. Fort led the 81st Division (Philippines) during the initial Battle of the Philippines and the Japanese invasion of Malabang. After fighting a last-ditch stand, Fort was ordered by his higher command to surrender and be taken prisoner by Japanese forces. His captors demanded Fort help persuade his former soldiers engaged in guerrilla warfare to stop resisting the occupation. Fort refused and was executed by firing squad. Fort is the only American-born general officer to be executed by enemy forces.

== Life ==
Guy Osborne Fort was born in 1879 to Jacob Marvin Fort and Lena Fulkerson in Kellerville, Michigan, in an area now known as Traverse City. The family later moved to Gloversville, New York, where Fort enlisted in the U.S. Army in 1899.

Fort settled in the Philippines with his first wife, Marguerite Eugine Fort, who died in 1927 shortly after giving birth to their second son. He later married again, with his second wife Mary Angeles Adams dying at the start of World War II. His great-granddaughter was Filipina child actress, singer and model Julie Vega.

Fort regularly wrote home to family in Gloversville, and during the 1930s said he considered retiring and returning to the United States. However, he lacked a copy of his birth certificate and was unsure if he'd be allowed back, or if he could find a job during the Great Depression. His last letter home was in April 1939.

== Military and constabulary career ==
Fort served for three years in the 4th U.S. Cavalry in the Philippines before being discharged in 1902. Two years later he was commissioned as a 3rd Lieutenant in the Philippine Constabulary, a gendarmerie-style police force under American control. As a member of the constabulary, he helped suppress the Moro Rebellion.

Aside from a stint as a plantation manager from 1917 to 1922, Fort remained with the constabulary until World War II, advancing to the rank of Colonel. Stationed mainly in Mindanao, Fort was noted for both studying and observing the rituals and customs of the people he served among and for convincing outlaw bands to lay down their arms. In particular, Fort was known among the Americans as an expert on the Moro people. While in the constabulary, he also served briefly as the interim governor of the province of Agusan.

== World War II ==
In November 1941, facing the pending Japanese invasion of the Philippines, the constabulary became part of the Philippine Army under the control of the United States Army Forces in the Far East. That month Fort was sent to Bohol to take command of the 81st Division (Philippines). On December 20, 1941, Fort was promoted to brigadier general.

Fort took his division to Lanao province in Mindanao where he organized and outfitted several battalions of Moro soldiers and planned a defense in depth for his sector. Foreseeing defeat, he also prepared his division to wage guerrilla warfare against the Japanese.

Fort's 81st Division began fighting on April 29, 1942, against the better organized and equipped Japanese army. For the next few weeks Fort's Lanao force engaged in continual fighting, resulting in heavy Japanese casualties. However, the Japanese also continually pushed the defenders back.

The division fought longer than other army groups before surrendering and made use of demolitions to close one of the main roads through the island.

== Surrender and execution ==
After making a last-ditch stand against the Japanese on Mindanao, Fort received orders to surrender from his higher command. While Fort protested these orders, he ultimately obeyed them and surrendered his forces on May 27, 1942. Fort's surrender was fiercely opposed by the Maranao and other Moro people in Mindanao. However, despite surrendering Fort let the Maranaos claim the U.S. Army's rifles and equipment, which they would then use in guerrilla warfare.

Along with Fort, 46 Americans and some 300 Filipinos under his command also surrendered, with the Americans ordered by their overall commander William F. Sharp not to flee into the hills or face court martial. After Fort's surrender he was shipped north on the small freighter Maru San alongside other captive generals, including his direct commander Sharp plus Joseph P. Vachon and Manuel Roxas. After the war Roxas would become the first president of the Philippines. Fort was then escorted by the Kempeitai to Manila, where he remained for several months. In November 1942 the Japanese sought Fort's help in talking to the Moro people, who had started a new rebellion against the occupying forces. Specifically, Fort was supposed to tell the Moro that since the U.S. Army had surrendered they must also surrender. Fort was brought from Manila back to Marawi (then known as Dansalan) on Mindanao to tell the Moro to surrender. However, Fort refused to cooperate.

Fort was then paraded through the city of Dansalan and executed by a firing squad under the order of Lt. Colonel Yoshinari Tanaka. Reportedly, Fort's last words were "You may get me but you will never get the United States of America." An Allied war crimes tribunal later sentenced Tanaka to death by hanging for the executions of Fort and three other Americans, and he was executed at Sugamo Prison on April 9, 1949. After Fort's execution Moro guerrilla groups staged revenge attacks against Japanese forces.

Fort is the only American-born general officer to be executed by enemy forces. However, he is not the only American general officer to die at enemy hands.

There is controversy over what happened to Fort's body. According to the U.S. government, Fort's body was never recovered, resulting in his name being engraved on the tablets of the missing at the Manila American Cemetery. However, a former prisoner of war and later provincial governor named Ignacio S. Cruz said he located Fort's remains and turned them over to the American Graves Registration Service. In 2017 Fort's granddaughter and six other families of missing soldiers filed a lawsuit against the U.S. government's Defense POW/MIA Accounting Agency. The families are seeking an order to exhume the bodies of Fort and others and do DNA tests to identify the remains.

== Military awards ==
Army Distinguished Service Medal
Purple Heart
Prisoner of War Medal
Philippine Campaign Medal
American Defense Service Medal with "Foreign Service" clasp
Asiatic–Pacific Campaign Medal with campaign star
World War II Victory Medal
Philippine Defense Medal with star
