= Kawaguchi Detachment =

Japanese army brigade in World War II

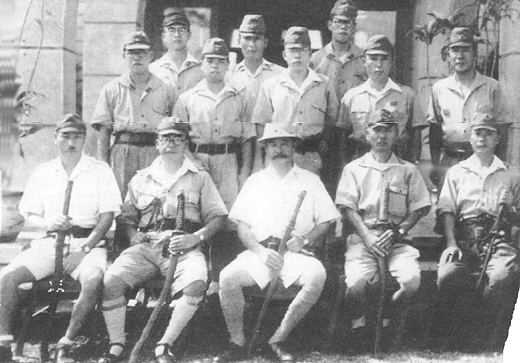
- Kiyotake Kawaguchi (seated center), and other leaders of the detachment, at Palau in mid-1942
- Active: 1941–1945
- Country: Japan
- Branch: Imperial Japanese Army

Commanders
- Commander: Kiyotake Kawaguchi

The Kawaguchi Detachment (Japanese: 川口支隊) was an Imperial Japanese Army brigade that existed during World War II. Under the command of Major General Kiyotake Kawaguchi, they fought in the Battle of Borneo and a part of the Guadalcanal Campaign. After October 1942, they had a different commander.

Starting in December 1941, the Japanese invaded British Borneo, in what would become the Battle of Borneo. They was successful in the ensuing months, capturing the cities of Miri and Kuching. They moved around the Pacific in mid-1942, and were sent to Guadalcanal in August, after the Americans took the island and Kiyoano Ichiki's Ichiki Detachment failed to retake it.

At Guadalcanal, they were made up of 17 different groups, and 9,208 soldiers at different times. They lost their two attempts to take Henderson Field from the Americans during the Battle of Edson's Ridge, the first of which was on September 12 to 13, and the second on the 13th to 14th. Their failure led to the IJA taking the Guadalcanal campaign seriously. In the Actions along the Matanikau in September and October, the Japanese won the September action and lost heavily in October. During the planning for the Battle of Henderson Field, Kawaguchi suddenly changed their positioning and only had one of his three battalions available for the battle's southern attack, so he was relieved of his duties.

== Battle of Borneo ==
In 1941, the Japanese began a plan to invade the island of Borneo, which was split in ownership between the British and Dutch. Starting in December 1941, at the Battle of Borneo, the Imperial Japanese Army's Major General Kawaguchi Detachment was commanded by Kiyotaki Kawaguchi. It was a part of the 18th Division, and at its core were three of the 18th's battalions.

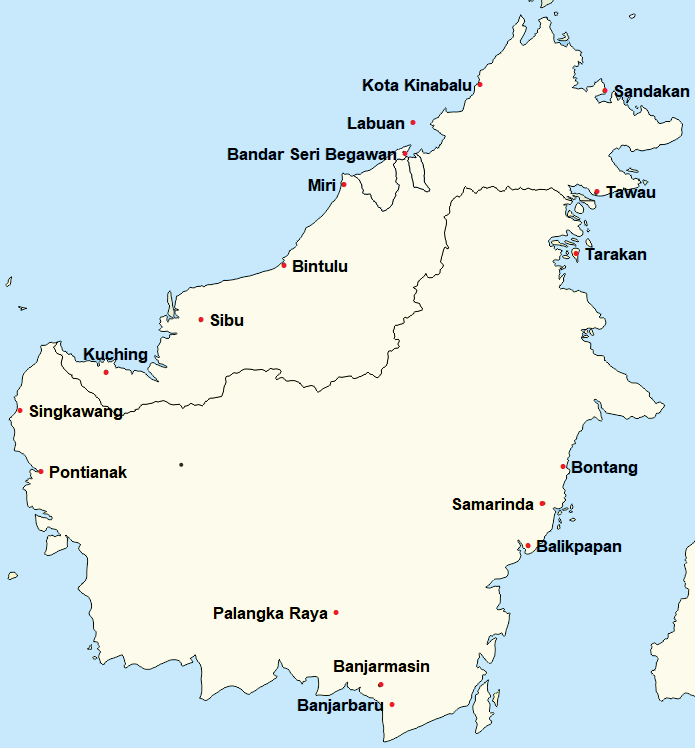
A map of major cities and towns in Borneo, with modern borders. The line dividing the island west-to-east was the border between British Borneo (above it) and Dutch Borneo (below). The Japanese first landed at Miri (center north) and moved west to Kuching

In November, Kamaguchi was in Japanese-occupied Indochina. On November 10, the Japanese War Ministry assembled multiple commanders, including Kawaguchi, and told them to prepare for an invasion. On November 16, the Southern Army issued an order which told the detachment to first occupy Miri and Seria in British Borneo, secure "vital resource areas" and air bases there, and then quickly occupy the airfield at Kuching. Then, the air bases would be made ready for use, and the commanders involved, including Kawaguchi, were to establish a military administration in the area.

On December 16, the detachment made a successful landing at Miri. They planned to go to Kuching on the 20th, but postponed it, as they came under attack on the 17th, 18th, and 19th. Still, by the 23rd, they had taken the area. They were unable to use the wells and other utilities in the area, because they had been destroyed. The Europeans in the area were either sent to the Lintang death camp in Kuching, where one third died, or the Sandakan camp, where almost all died.

They landed at Kuching on the 24th, escorted by the Malaya Unit's 2nd Escort Unit. Enemy air raids and torpedo attacks sunk three of their destroyers and damaged several transport ships, but they were successful; they captured Kuching on the 25th. On the 28th, they were ordered to seize either airfields near Bengkayang, or a port which leads to those airfields. On December 28, they were told to prepare for capturing the airfields at Ledo (in the Bengkayang area), and the ports to Ledo. On January 6, they were ordered to begin.

The detachment seized the Ledo airfield at 1000 hours on January 27. They reported that they destroyed a dozen or more bridges on the road from Singkawang to Ledo. Those roads were repaired in February to transport personnel and supplies. On February 4, the detachment announced it had completed the runway at the Ledo airfield.

They were later moved to the Philippines. By June, they were in Palau, and they were planned to go to New Guinea, but were moved to Guadalcanal in August.

== Guadalcanal campaign ==
=== Background ===
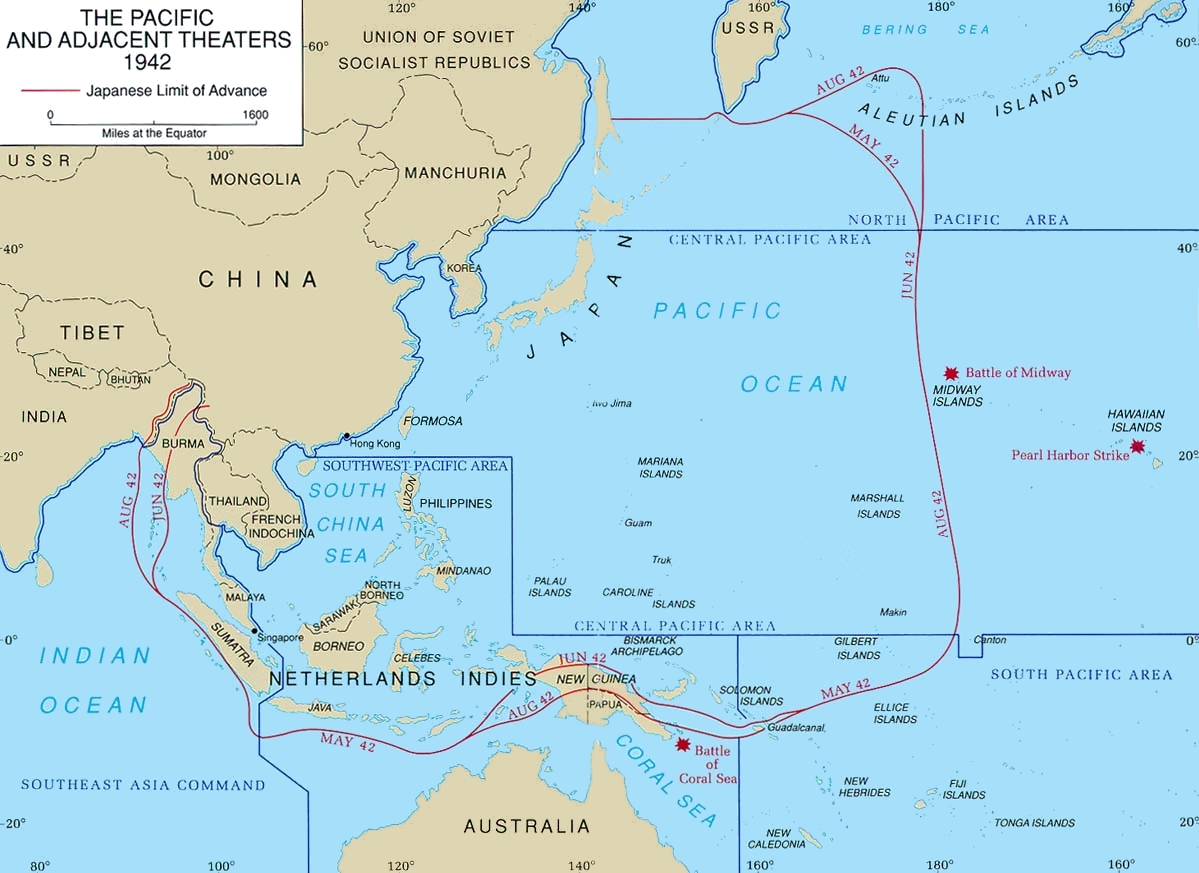
Japanese control of the western Pacific area between May and August 1942. Guadalcanal is located in the lower right center of the map.

The U.S. surprised the Japanese when they landed at Guadalcanal on August 7, 1942. During the ensuing Guadalcanal Campaign, there were two major Japanese groups who attempted to retake the island. On August 10, the available units to retake the islands of Guadalcanal and Tulagi were Kawaguchi, Ichiki, and Aoki Detachments. The Ichiki Detachment, commanded by Colonel Kiyoano Ichiki, was the closest, so they initially went to the island. On the 20th, the Americans took Henderson Field, the Japanese air base on Guadalcanal. Ichiki's attack failed in the Battle of the Eastern Solomons (started on the 24th), so the Kawaguchi Detachment were ordered to go to Guadalcanal island.

The Kawaguchi Detachment would consist of the 35th Infantry Brigade headquarters (135 soldiers), 124th Infantry Regiment (3,300), the Ichiki Detachment's Kuma Battalion (1,885), and 14 other groups, in total equaling 9,208 soldiers who were at Guadalcanal at any given point. On September 8, there were 6,200, and on November 20, there were 4,944, though only 2,900 were capable of duty.

==== Planning ====
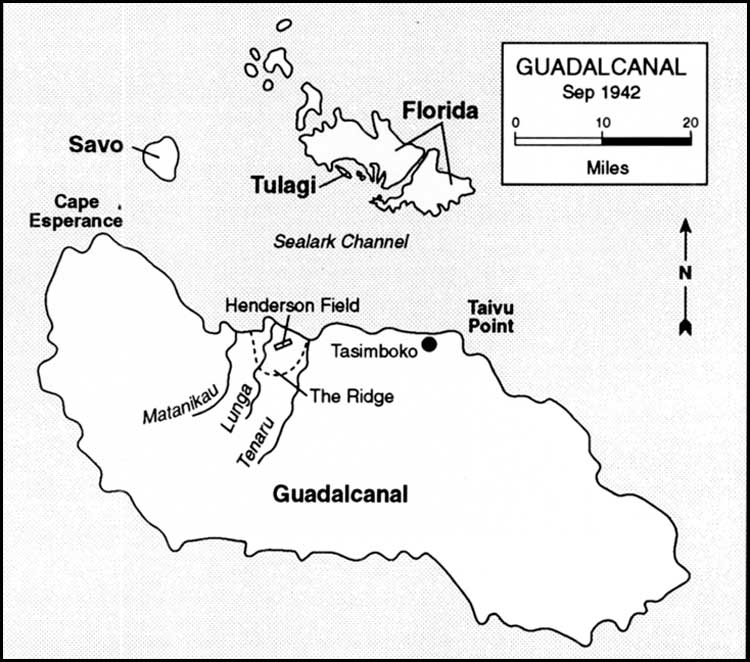
Guadalcanal in September 1942, showing Taivu Point (the first detachment landing) and Henderson Field (the planned point of attack)

The Battle of the Eastern Solomons demonstrated that transport convoys were not feasible for moving troops at the moment, so the detachment loaded onto four destroyers. Their lead unit was the 124th's II Battalion. On the afternoon of the 24th, about 112 kilometers (70 miles) north of Guadalcanal, the detachment was attacked by American dive-bombers. One destroyer was sunk and two were damaged. This led to Kawaguchi planning to move the 124th's II Battalion to Guadalcanal by barge on September 5. This was a part of the Japanese "rat runs", which brought new groups of troops to the island by night every night. On the night of 29–30, the 124th's I Battalion and the Kuma Battalion arrived at Taivu Point on the eastern side of the U.S. Marine perimeter. Kawaguchi himself arrived on the 31st, and 1000 men from the 4th's II Battalion arrived on the night of September 4–5. The barge carrying the 124th's II Battalion that planned to land on the night of the 5th, was mostly broken up by American air attacks, and many of its soldiers were scattered across northwest Guadalcanal and Savo Island.

After the 124th's II Battalion became unavailable, the Kawaguchi Detachment had five available battalions; three were grouped into a Main Body, and the other two flanked the Main Body as the Left and Right Wings. He also had elements of the Ichiki Detachment (the Kuma Battalion) and the Aoki Detachment (the 4th Infantry Regiment's II Battalion). The Main Body would be under Kawaguchi's direct command, and consisted of the 124th's I and III Battalions, and 4th's II Battalion. He planned for them to attack at Taivu Point east of the Marine perimeter on Guadalcanal, and then march south of the perimeter, attacking Henderson Field from inland. The 124th's II Battalion was too far away to participate on the eastern part of the perimeter, so they were ordered to attack the southwestern part of the perimeter as the Left Wing. The Kuma Battalion, as the Right Wing, would go an area named Alligator Creek and attack north. The attack was planned for the 12th, and the Main Body started marching on the 9th. They were noticed by Americans, whose 1st Raider Battalion and 1st Parachute Battalion attacked them in a reconnaissance mission. 27 Japanese died, and some of their supplies were destroyed.

=== Battle of Edson's Ridge ===
Lieutenant Colonel Edson, divisions operation officer and commander of the Raider and Parachute Battalions, theorized that the Japanese were going to attack at a point south of the airfield, Edson's Ridge. It is about one mile south of the airfield, and is 1,000 yards long. Incoming soldiers to the airfield would be obscured by two large knolls, 80 and 120 feet above sea level, and a dense jungle. The Main Body carefully avoided letting themselves be spotted from the air as they marched to the ridge. At one point, one of the battalions got out of contact from the others and did not meet back up with them until the 12th. On the morning of the 10th, Edson's men set up at the ridge, and they were attacked by Japanese bombers, killing 11 and wounding 14. Still, this let the Americans know the Japanese intentions. These Marines had no prior warfare experience in a jungle setting, but quickly adapted to it.

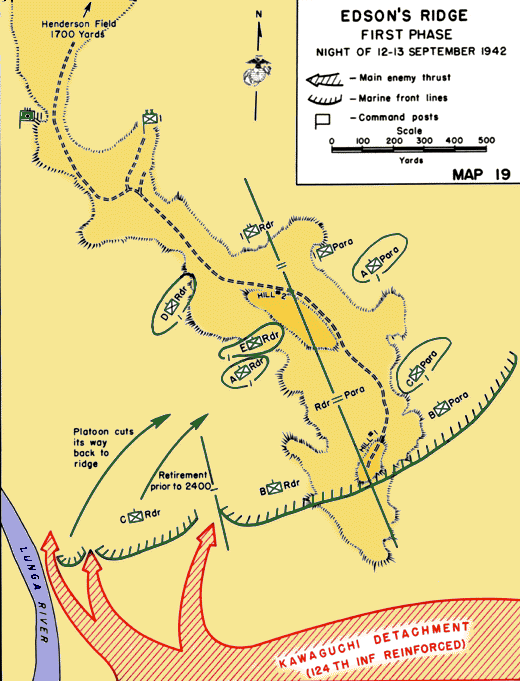
The 124th's I and III Battalions breaking through between the ridge and the Lunga River on the night of the 12th

==== September 12th ====
By the night of the 12th, 840 Marines were set up there in a series of groups across the ridge. Five companies of Raiders were put on the west, with their right flank being secured by the Lunga River running parallel to the ridge. They formed in a series of points, because the terrain was too dense to form in a line. Kawaguchi planned for a controlled, specific attack at the ridge at 2000 hrs. The plan failed, starting when 124th's I and III Battalions arrived at the assembly area after 2000 hrs. He decided to shift the body left to move between the Lunga River and the ridge. The 124th's I and III Battalions combined as they crossed the ridge, and they were the only groups of the detachment to actually make contact with the Americans that night. They got in between two groups of Raiders, but did not make heavy damage. Kawaguchi's commanders established control by sunrise. The 4th's II Battalion did not get to the ridge in time. The Kuma Battalion assembled at an area too far east, and they never made contact with the Americans.

==== September 13th ====
Edson correctly guessed the Japanese would return the next day. Kawaguchi planned for a second attack on the 13th at 2200 hours. The Americans pulled back 200 meters from the ridge, where they had more visibility. They placed a 5th Marines' 2nd Battalion divisional reserve unit below the airfield, and a 1st Engineer Battalion company between the Lunga River and the ridge.

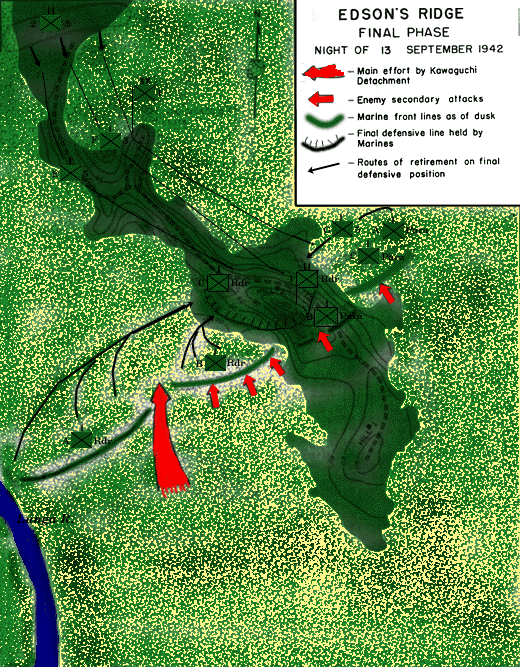
The Japanese forcing the Americans into one position, Hill 123, on the ridge

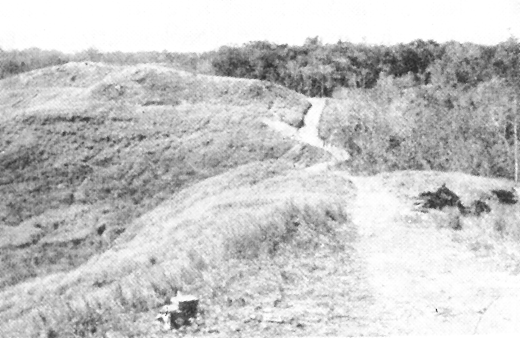
A view of Hill 123, where Edson set up a command post

The first attack, by the Left Wing, took place on the west at 1815 hrs. They were stopped by American artillery. The attack between the Lunga and the ridge started at 1830 hours. Fighting moved to the ridge, where the 124th's I Battalion and the 4th's II Battalion fought 300 of the Raiders' Company B. The Japanese used grenade dischargers to make a way onto the ridge, which pushed the Marines back. Edson moved to set up a command post on a knoll in the center of the ridge, while Marines used mortars and 105mm-shell howitzer fire to keep their new line amidst Japanese charges. The Kuma Battalion attempted to find the Marine positions at 2200 hours.

==== September 14th ====
At 0200 hours, the line between Edson's command post and the division headquarters was cut, which hurt the artillery support. The American Alexander Vandegrift, back at headquarters, sent out parts of his reserve battalion to support Edson, and together they staved off two more Japanese attacks between 0400 hours and dawn. The Japanese almost achieved their objective, despite massive losses. A company of the 4th's II Battalion penetrated the marine line, and 50 to 60 of its men reached the edge of Henderson's eastern satellite airfield, Fighter One, and overran a unit of engineers there.

Ultimately, Kawaguchi's second attacks failed. Attacks lessened during a company-level skirmish in which a Japanese commander was killed. The 124th's III Battalion were not present for the fight, except for one company attacking the Parachute Battalion's left flank. The two Kawaguchi wings put in weak attacks. Likely over 800 Japanese were killed or went missing, mostly due to 11 Marines of the 5th Battalion, who fired 1,992 rounds. 96 Americans were killed or went missing, and 222 were wounded. Even if the Japanese got to Henderson, they probably couldn't have held it, considering they would be weakened getting there, and have been in open terrain with little ammo and supplies, and no heavy gunfire.

The Japanese 17th army first heard about the failed attacks on the morning of the 15th. It forced the army to take the Guadalcanal campaign seriously, and more divisions were sent there to back up Kawaguchi. Kawaguchi ordered his men to march west around the perimeter. On the 19th, they reached Kokumbona, on the western side of the Matanikau River, after a long march without any food. By the end of October, the Japanese had 23,088 men on Guadalcanal, and the Americans had 23,088. The Japanese believed they had enough men to take back the island.

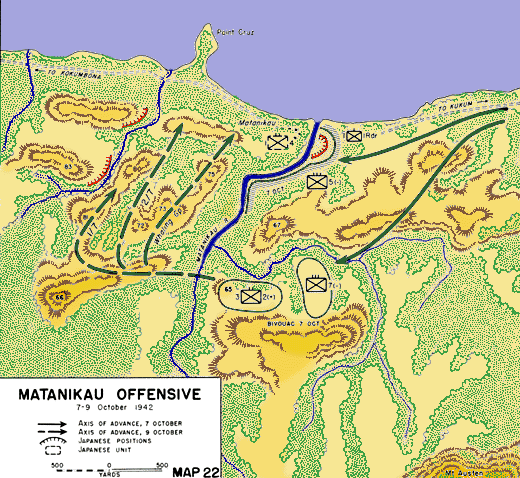
The Matanikau action of October 7–9

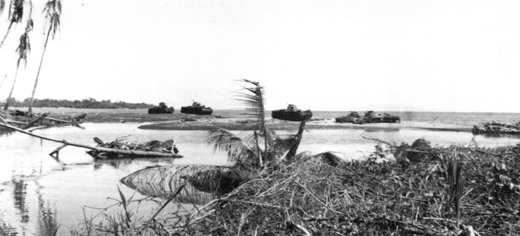
Japanese tanks knocked out by 37 mm guns near the mouth of the Matanikau River after the October action

=== Actions along the Matanikau ===
Vandegrift started an operation to stop the Japanese from building up their forces unimpeded. This led to the actions along the Matanikau, two attacks by Americans in September and October to clear both sides of the Matanikau of Japanese. The Japanese won the action from September 24 to 27; 60 Americans were killed, and 100 were wounded, while Japanese losses were minor.

The 17th army wanted to establish a bridgehead across the eastern side of the Matanikau, to move heavy artillery across the sandbar by the river's estuary. They ordered Kawaguchi to do so twice, and he denied the orders. He was known for often taking orders as suggestions. Still, he was kept as a commander of an upcoming major attack planned for October. On October 3, the Japanese 2nd Division was sent to the island with supplies, along with Lieutenant General Murayama Masao. Because Kawaguchi was reluctant, Masao sent the 4th Infantry Brigade to the western side of the river's northern section on October 5. This notified Vandegrift that the Japanese were planned an offensive, and on the 7th, two Marine units crossed the river to the west and moved north towards the coast. The Japanese did not retreat, and they were trapped by artillery and mortars on the 9th. The 4th Infantry Regiment lost 700 men, while the Marines lost 65, and 125 were wounded. This jeopardized the planned October offensive, but the Japanese were still going through with it.

=== Planning of the Battle for Henderson Field ===
The Japanese wanted to get to Henderson Field through the coast, but there was no bridgehead across the Matanikau, and planners of the 17th army did not try to re-establish one. Thus, the plan would resemble the plan during the Battle of Edson's Ridge (to attack the airfield from the south), except with the larger number of soldiers. This would hopefully surprise the Americans. The main attack would be done by the 2nd Division, supported by the Left Wing of Major General Nasu's 29th Infantry Regiment, and the Right Wing, where Kawaguchi would command two battalions from the 2nd Division's 230th Infantry Regiment and the 124th's III Battalion. The reserve would be Masao's 16th Infantry Regiment. Other units (the 124th's I and II Battalions, and the 4th's III Battalion) would cross the Matanikau and attack from the coast to draw the Americans' attention. The attack was planned for October 22, and they started marching on the 16th. This plan was faulty considering the troops that were on the island before October were still weakened, and they would be even more weakened by marching. Meanwhile, the Americans placed their troops along both the Matanikau and the ridge.

On October 21, it was clear the attack would not be in time, so it was moved for the 23rd. Late into the 22nd, as Masao had brought his troops to the correct position Kawaguchi moved his troops to the east, allegedly deciding to change his strategy viewing aerial photographs of the area. This was done without waiting for orders, and without telling Masao. Kawaguchi told Masao on the 23rd he would only have one of his three battalions available for the attack, and that he would not be available for an attack from the south. Kawaguchi was then relieved, and his place was taken by a commander of the 230th Infantry Regiment. The Japanese heavily lost the battle, as 2,200 men were killed. 50 Americans died.

== 35th Independent Mixed Brigade ==
The brigade was reactivated on 10 February 1944 in Tokyo and stationed at the Andaman Islands under Lieutenant General Yoshihisa Inoue. Inoue was reassigned to command the 94th Division and replaced on 23 May 1945 by Major General Noboru Sato.

== See also ==
- Independent Mixed Brigades (Imperial Japanese Army)
