= Maximo P. Young =

Filipino war veteran (1922–2022)

Maximo Purisima Young
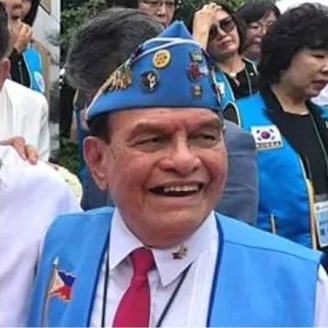
- Born: July 30, 1922
- Died: January 29, 2022 (aged 99); Makati City, Philippines
- Burial place: Libingan Ng Mga Bayani, Taguig, Philippines
- Education: US Army Armored Force School, Fort Knox
- Military career
- Allegiance: Philippines; United States
- Branch: Philippine Army
- Service years: 1941–1971
- Rank: Major
- Units: 10th Battalion Combat Team 74th Infantry Regiment (PA) 7th Military District
- Commands: Recon Company, 10th Battalion Combat Team
- Known for: Hero of Battle of Muidong
- Conflicts: Battle of Yultong; Battle of Muidong
- Awards: Korean Taegeuk Medal US Silver Star; Philippine Medal of Valor US Congressional Gold Medal

Maximo P. Young (July 30, 1922 – January 29, 2022), was a Filipino Army soldier who was a distinguished veteran of World War II, the Korean War, and the Vietnam War. He is a decorated and bemedaled war hero being a recipient of second highest military award Silver Star from the United States, the highest Military Award of Republic of Korea and Gold Cross Medal of the Philippines for his service in Korean War.

== Background ==
Young was born on July 30, 1922. He spent his childhood in Opon (now Lapu-Lapu City), Cebu. The unusual circumstances of his childhood, he almost died after contracting mysterious ailment but miraculously cured. The harsh events of World War II deprived him of the opportunity to earn a secondary school diploma. He only reached 2nd Year High School only. He would work as seaman on SS Divina before the war.

He met his first wife Norma Tobias during his military deployment at Sta. Cruz, Laguna and courted her. They married and had 8 children together. When Norma died, he married his second wife Mercedes Secillano. They had 2 children.

== Military career ==
=== World War II ===
Young was 19 years old when he heard President Franklin D. Roosevelt call upon Filipinos to join American forces fighting in the Philippine Islands during World War II in just a day after Japan attacked Pearl Harbor on December 7, 1941. While working at MV Legaspi, he was conscripted by USAFFE and spent the war on the boat, shipping critical supplies and troops through the waters around Manila. He was one of the crew of MV Legaspi as shipping clerk when it was sunk off the coast of Puerto Galera, Mindoro, by two Japanese warship when it was transporting supplies and soldiers from Visayas to Luzon to fight Japanese. He was captured but was able to escaped later by swimming on the shore. He went on to lead guerillas in Negros under Captain Ernesto S. Mata. He became a town hero of San Carlos, Negros Oriental, when he and his team eliminated a notorious villain who was creating much trouble in the community. He aided Americans in their planned to return in the islands.

=== Post War ===
After the War, he received the US Silver Star from US Government for his service as crewmember of MV Legaspi but he was frustrated by one of those Filipino soldiers not being given of full recognition and benefits of a US Soldier of the US. He continued his service with the Philippine Army in fighting domestic enemies, the communist Hukbalahap and later as instructor of new recruits in Fort William McKinley (now Fort Bonifacio), Rizal. In 1947 he was sent to US Army Armored Force School at Fort Knox in Kentucky and was trained as tank commander. He was selected to be part of newly formed 10th Battalion Combat Team (10th BCT), the only armored tank motorized battalion in the Philippine Army then as tank commander.

=== Korean War ===
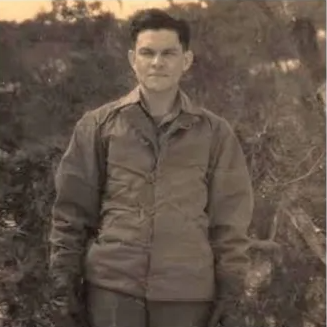
Then First Sergeant and Tank Commander Maximo P. Young

10th BCT was part of the Philippine Expeditionary Forces to Korea (PEFTOK) and was sent to Korea as part of the Philippines commitment to the United Nations military assistance to Republic of Korea during Korean War. He and the 10th BCT arrived in Korea on September 19, 1950. He was then promoted to First Sergeant and assigned as Tank Platoon Commander.

==== Battle of Yultong ====
He was with the only 900 members of the 10th BCT who repulsed 40,000 soldiers of Chinese People's Volunteer Army's 44th Infantry Division and the North Korean People's Army that struck them at Yultong. This incident was known as the greatest Philippine victory in the Korean War, which took place April 22 and 23 in 1951.

Upon returning home he became Tactical Officer in various ROTC training in colleges and universities in Metro Manila. He also became training officer in Army Training Center in Fort Bonifacio.

=== Vietnam War ===
In 1966, he found himself in South Vietnam and served again as Military Advisor of the Civil Operations and Revolutionary Development Support Group (CORDS). He returned home after he was injured after evading having almost captured by armed men of the North Vietnamese Militia. He contracted a virulent ailment that almost brought him to the brink of death.

Upon returning home and recuperating from his injuries, Captain Maximo P. Young was posted as Security Officer at AFP Supply Center at Camp Murphy (now Camp Aguinaldo). He attained the rank of Major as his last rank before retiring.

== Post Military Career ==
After retiring he was employed first at the Regional Agency for anti-smuggling campaign. He worked in RR Public Relations Firm owned and managed by top PR practitioner. Later he worked as Marketing Marketing of Sugeco Corporation in Cebu where he was awarded a commendation by the association of the industry's various competitors in the market.

== Awards and Legacy ==
In 2018, along with late Captain Conrado Yap they were awarded the 1st Class of the Taeguk Cordon of Military Merit. He was one of the 12 Filipino Veterans awarded by Ambassador Sung Kim of US Congressional Gold Medal awarded to civilians by US Government 72 years later.

=== Death ===
Major Maximo P. Young died on January 29, 2022, six month short of his 100th birthday due to heart ailment joining his first wife Norma and survived by his 8 children by his first wife and 27 grandchildren. He is also survived by his second wife Mercy and her 3 children.

== See also ==
- 10th Battalion Combat Team
- Philippine Expeditionary Force to Korea
