= Emilio S. Liwanag =

Philippine Navy Captain - Legion of Merit recipient

- Born: 27 March 1911; Dagupan, Pangasinan, Insular Government of the Philippine Islands, U.S.
- Died: 12 April 1967 (age 56); Quezon City, Philippines
- Burial place: Libingan ng mga Bayani (Cemetery of Heroes) in Taguig
- Military career
- Allegiance: Philippines
- Branch: Philippine Navy
- Service years: 1938–1941, 1950–51 (Army); 1941–1946 (USAFFE); 1946–1963 (Navy)
- Rank: Captain (Navy); Captain (USAFFE)
- Units: Offshore Patrol - (USAFFE); Philippine Naval Patrol (Navy); 10th Battalion Combat Team - PEFTOK (Army)
- Commands: Philippine Naval Operating Force; Philippine Navy Service Force
- Conflicts: World War II; Battle of Bataan; Battle of Manila; Korean War; Battle of Yultong
- Awards: Legion of Merit (USA)

Captain Emilio Soriano Liwanag (March 27, 1911 – April 12, 1967) was an officer in the Philippine Navy who served during the Second World War and the Korean War.

He started his military career as a 3rd lieutenant with the 3rd Light Infantry Regiment in the Philippine Commonwealth Army after graduation from the Philippine Military Academy. He joined the Offshore Patrol unit of the U.S. Army Forces in the Far East (USAFFE) as a 1st Lieutenant during the Second World War and was involved in the Battle of Bataan and during the country's liberation in the Battle of Manila.

During the Korean War, he served as a Lieutenant Commander - Artillery and Logistic officer in the Army's 10th Battalion Combat Team as part of the United Nations Forces - Philippine Expeditionary Forces To Korea (PEFTOK) during the first year of the war, which was the first deployment of Philippine combat forces under the Republic of the Philippines into foreign soil. Shortly after finishing his first tour in Korea, he immediately served a second tour as Liaison officer under the Philippine Navy for the UN Command and Philippine Diplomatic Representative in Tokyo, Japan.

Liwanag later served as the commander in the Navy's Service Force (NSF) during the 1960s and later became the commandant of the Naval Operating Force (NOF) which is the main fighting element of the Philippine Navy, till he was retired from active service.

== Early life and education ==
Liwanag was born on March 27, 1911, in Dagupan, Pangasinan, Philippines, to Francisco Liwanag and Ana Soriano. He was sixth among seven children, three brothers and three sisters.

He attended the Philippine Military Academy at Baguio City, Mountain Province, Philippines from November 27, 1933, to May 31, 1935, under the academic program. Then entered the military program from June 1, 1935, to March 25, 1938, where he graduated from the Class of 1938 with a Bachelor of Science degree. With the Philippines under the American rule at that time, Liwanag spoke fluent English. After graduation he was appointed to the 3rd Light Infantry Regiment as a 3rd lieutenant in the Philippine Commonwealth Army.

On February 9, 1939, he graduated from the Army's Off Shore Patrol (OSP) Training School & Headquarters in Muelle del Codo, Port Area, Manila as part of the newly formed maritime element which he voluntarily joined. He was trained on seamanship, navigation and gunnery which were conducted with the Filipino USNA graduates as instructors.

At Fort William McKinley (now Fort Bonifacio), he studied in the Advanced Infantry Gunnery Course (artillery) in 1950 before his deployment to Korea under the Philippine Army.

He attended the United States at the Naval Mine Warfare School (NSMW), in naval mine and countermeasures familiarization course in Yorktown, Virginia in 1957. The program was part of a foreign naval officials delegation visit to US Naval ship building facilities of Newport News Shipbuilding and Dry Dock Company. Liwanag was one of nine allied foreign naval officers which included countries from France, Taiwan, Japan, Turkey, Spain, Norway, Greece and Germany.

== Military career ==
=== World War II ===
At the outbreak of World War II, Liwanag was promoted to second lieutenant on March 26, 1940. Assigned as the supply officer of the Offshore Patrol (OSP). During 1941, the Offshore Patrol - the forerunner of the Philippine Navy – was the only Filipino naval force after the United States Asiatic Fleet which is in charge of the naval protection for the Philippines. He was temporarily promoted to first lieutenant, September 27, 1941. A few weeks after the Japanese attack on Pearl Harbor, his rank became permanent after he was inducted into the US Army Forces in the Far East (USAFFE) on December 19, 1941. Four days later, the Japanese planes bombed the Offshore Patrol two-storied headquarters in Muelle del Codo, Port Area, Manila where he was stationed; he was in Bataan when this incident happened. The Naval Headquarters was lightly staffed at that time, only 20 personnel, since all officers and personnel were located across Manila Bay in Bataan and Corregidor preparing its defenses for invasion. To spare Manila from destruction from the Japanese invasion force, Manila was declared an "open city". Since the military wasn't returning to Manila, the OSP Commander, Captain Enrique L. "Henry" Jurado, ordered the Headquarters to be burned down completely before the Japanese arrival into the city.

Liwanag relocated and served in the Harbor Defense Force under the Offshore Patrol unit in Lamao, Bataan during the Battle of Bataan. Lamao was the new location of the OSP headquarters which was based at the Lamao Horticulture Center, Liwanag became the officer-in-charge of shore duty at the Lamao Headquarters and docking facilities after the OSP HQ was later moved. In total there were mostly 60 men in the OSP unit which was divided into 2 main groups: sea and shore duty. During the next three and a half months, his half of the unit was in charge of shore duty along the eastern coast way of Bataan. They created fortified defensive positions along the shores and harbors, supplied food, ammunition, medicine and provisions for the front lines. They used a supply point across southernmost point of Manila Bay and Corregidor Island, using 55-foot (17 m) and 65-foot (19 m) high-speed Thorneycroft Coastal Motor Boat (CMB), also known as Q-boats, available to them along with several converted civilian "fast" boats from the OSP - sea duty unit. When the sea duty unit is not transferring vital supplies, they were to engage the Japanese forces using their Q-boats by hindering or destroying any landing assaults on the country's shoreline.

By mid-February during the Battle of Bataan, Japanese forces managed to breach the battle line north of Lamao forcing droves of American and Filipino soldiers trying to escape capture by any means. Some of these soldiers found their way to Lamao, at the mouth of the Alangan River, knowing that boats were located there. During a cargo drop-off, Liwanag noticed a small number of armed and unarmed soldiers, about a dozen, were trying to board the docked Q-boats which was strictly ordered to carry ammo and supplies only, not indigenous personnel. Without the knowledge that the battle line had been breached, he threatened many of the soldiers who board any of the Q-boats will be shot. Liwanag escorted the off loaded Q-boats to their supply point. As he returned from the supply trip back to Lamao, his harbor and shoreline was overwhelmed by a larger crowded chaotic scene of desperate troops eager to escape the Japanese advance. He realized the battle line has finally failed and understood the peril of these men and the danger of his own unit's position. He ordered all Q-boats on dock to dump their cargo and prepare to take on passengers for an immediate evacuation mission. Then he organized the harbor evacuations because the retreating troops were endangering the Q-boats by overloading and capsizing them, at the same time restore some form of order to the chaotic mess. From his dock, he sent out an urgent radio order and a general distress call for more needed boats from across Manila Bay. While all types of civilian boats were volunteering to assist in the evacuation, as more retreating troops kept flooding in. He ordered a number of these troops to create a guard perimeter, which a group of volunteers took the task to provide a security buffer outside the dock facilities from enemy incursions while the evacuation took place. As the daylight fell, the Japanese were slowly closing in, he ordered a number of the waiting troops with demolition skills to assist in preparing the harbor and the oil refinery facilities nearby for destruction by using the ordnance from their last supply run and available on-site supplies so it would not be useful to the Japanese. They used as much of their harbor's fuel resources to fill the tanks of all the incoming boats and any portable fuel canisters, since Lamao with its oil refinery facilities was also a fuel & supply depot.

When all the troops and non-essential personnel were safely shuttled off, he ordered all remaining boats to start loading the full fuel canisters on board to be dropped off at a friendly port. The fuel was mainly used for sea duty's Q-boats to remain functional since they didn't know where another fuel depot would be located. He continued coordinating the incoming and outgoing boats for the fuel removal. When a small group of retreating American and Filipino soldiers approached the perimeter guard's position, warning that the Japanese were just several minutes behind them. They relayed back that the Japanese were approaching their security perimeter. He ordered all of them to withdraw along with the entire harbor personnel to evacuate in any available boats. Since most of the docked boats were loaded with extra fuel tanks, the remaining harbor personnel had to sit on top of them as they departed. Liwanag along with several Q-boats remained and waited for all the volunteer perimeter guards and remaining soldiers to arrive. They all came running in and immediately jumped onto the now overloaded boats, saying the Japanese were behind them only by several minutes. He finally gave the order to activate the timed delayed explosives for the destruction of the oil refinery tanks, facilities and harbor. As his boat departed, some the perimeter guards on board started firing at the direction of the Japanese to keep them at bay, but ordered them to cease fire to prevent the Japanese from locking onto their position from their weapon's muzzle fire flash which would endangering themselves further since they were all sitting on top of portable fuel tanks. They used the night's darkness to conceal their departure with only the sounds of their boats motors indicating their departing presence. The harbor's total destruction took place late during the night with their withdrawal punctuated by a tremendous explosions of the oil refinery tanks which was seen across the Manila Bay.

They moved down further south to their new OSP HQ further down to Alasasin Point along the mouth of the Dinginen River, Bataan. Some the fuel resources they were able to salvage was relocated at this location and Corregidor. They remained at this location by early April until Japanese forces overran the beach defenses and were forced to evacuate to Corregidor.

His shore unit was forced to surrender after the declaration was broadcast from the Malinta Tunnel in Corregidor through the Voice of Freedom, for all USAFFE forces immediate surrender to the Japanese. At that point his unit was low on supplies and fuel getting scarce, since they had been cut off from additional supplies and reinforcements by better equipped and seasoned, front-line Japanese forces. Liwanag's shore unit, about 30 men, surrendered in Nasugbu, Batangas on April 9, 1942, while transferring evacuating personnel and supplies by boat from a withdrawal point off the most northern point of Batangas. Before they turned themselves over to the Japanese, he ordered the immediate destruction of their civilian boats once they docked, which some burned from lighting the portable fuel tanks and later shot out the bottoms to sink them making them less salvageable. When the Japanese questioned the boats location, he said they are still in Nasugbu docks but failed to tell them the boats' fate. He was transferred by trucks along with his unit to San Fernando, Pampanga, then crammed to standing room in train box cars as the Japanese overloaded them to more than double its capacity to Capas, Tarlac. Once they were offloaded in Capas, they marched the last three kilometers to the internment camp to be detained as POWs.

Liwanag was interned in Camp O'Donnell which was used as an internment camp for both American and Filipino prisoners of war in Capas, Tarlac from April 9 to August 4, 1942. The Japanese occupying force released a small number of Philippine military personnel after going thru a "rejuvenation program" to return to civilian life, of which he was one of the fortunate few. Their aim was to integrate them back to society but kept some of them under Japanese surveillance by Filipino collaborators loyal to the Japanese in the hope they would lead them to any Allied dissident forces. He witnessed several formerly released Philippine military personnel being picked up for suspicion of conspiracy against the Japanese. They were automatically returned to the POW camps or summarily executed. Under the scrutiny then he be might under surveillance, he could not return to his family for fear of endangering them by using them as leverage against him. He did not acknowledge any one of his civilian friends who recognized him, knowing that the Japanese might interrogate them. One of his friends knew the predicament he was in and notified the family of his whereabouts, which at that time believed he was still interned in Camp O'Donnell. Liwanag's wife doubted their friend that the Japanese were releasing Filipino military personnel, until she travelled to Capas and confirmed it on a posted form on the POW camp bulletin board of the 1,400 prisoners that were released. As a PMA officer, he was still obligated to his oath to duty. He would discreetly gather intelligence on Japanese positions, personnel, equipment and strength in the Manila vicinity. Knowing that the US General Douglas MacArthur would return from Australia, the information will be useful in the re-take of Manila and its surrounding towns.

Once the U.S. Forces returned to the Philippines and started driving back the Japanese forces, he sought out to rejoin the Allied forces but was recognized by a fellow POW whom he had been interned with that had connections to the guerrilla forces. With their help, they both got back to Allied hands. Liwanag was processed and placed back in the USAFFE and reinstated to his rank of first lieutenant on January 28, 1945. What was left of his Offshore Patrol unit was mainly dismantled by the Japanese, the main portion were still interned in Camp O'Donnell and other POW camps, the unit's boats were scuttled or burned so Japanese forces would not possess them. Only a small group of surviving personnel of the Offshore Patrol, sea duty units, conducted guerrilla hit-and-run attacks. With the enemy intelligence he gathered along with his knowledge of the layout of Manila, he was assigned to assist U.S. Army and USAFFE Army infantry units preparing to enter the city. Five days later, he fought alongside the U.S. Army and USAFFE Army units that he guided in the liberation of Manila. During the fierce month long battle for the capital, he witnessed the brutalities the Japanese troops had inflicted on the Filipino civilian population which was known as the Manila massacre.

After the Japanese were removed from Manila, Liwanag and surviving USAFFE OSP officers were in charge in rebuilding the Offshore Patrol Unit to continue with their duties of securing the country's sea and shores.

=== After World War II ===
After the war, he was promoted to the rank of an USAFFE captain on March 11, 1946. The USAFFE was disbanded as the Philippines won its independence from the United States on June 30, 1946. In July 1946, Liwanag returned to his old unit, which changed into the newly formed Philippine Naval Patrol and was reactivated to the promoted naval rank as a lieutenant commander. The President of the Philippines Manuel Roxas strengthened the Offshore Patrol after issuing Executive Order No. 94 on October 5, 1947. This order officially elevated the patrol to a major command that was equal to the other branches of the armed forces, which is now the Philippine Navy. The OSP was renamed the Philippine Naval Patrol (PNP), later on it changed into the Philippine Navy on January 5, 1951. Liwanag and fellow surviving OSP officers became the early pioneers that helped shaped the structure of the Philippine Navy.

=== Korean War ===
==== 10th BCT PEFTOK ====
Liwanag was part of the Philippine Expeditionary Forces To Korea (PEFTOK), the Philippine combat contingent of the United Nations forces that was deployed to Korea. As the only Philippine naval officer to volunteer to the army's combat contingent, he was assigned to the 10th Battalion Combat Team (BCT) - Motorized, Philippine Army - United Nations Command (UNC) as a navy lieutenant commander (equivalent to an army major) - artillery and logistics officer. The PEFTOK units were the first combat units to participate overseas under the newly formed Philippine Republic. They landed in Busan, Korea on September 19, 1950, along with 1,303 enlisted men and 64 officers who were transported by US Navy transport vessel, USNS Sgt. Sylvester Antolak (T-AP-192). The PEFTOK was the 8th foreign country after the Americans and the 27th British Commonwealth Infantry Brigade (consisting of units from the UK, Canada, Australia, New Zealand, India and 2 battalions from Hong Kong.) Most of the Filipino battalion were combat veterans who fought the Japanese Imperial Army either as a regular soldier or guerrilla. Some of the veterans has experience in fighting with a communist force, especially during the Hukbalahap Rebellion in the Philippines. The 10th BCT was first attached to and provided support for the American 25th Infantry Division.

The battalion had to deal with some immediate setbacks upon their arrival in the port of Busan, they have no winter weather clothing and no armor available for them. The cold weather of winter was a shock to almost all in the Filipino combat unit since the Philippines is a tropical island nation. They weren't prepared for the weather difference plus the lack of winter gear that was supposed to be available to them on their arrival. The 10th was Philippines' only armored tank battalion at the time, consisting of three rifle companies, a medium tank company, a reconnaissance company equipped with light tanks and a field artillery battery. They were equipped with a company of 29 M4 Sherman medium tanks and a company of M5 Stuart light tanks which all remained in the Philippines. The Americans were to supply the 10th with surplus tanks consisting of 17 M4 Shermans and one M10 tank destroyer which was awaiting for them in Korea. Unfortunately during the UN Command withdrawal from the Battle of Pusan Perimeter, their tanks were destroyed before they saw combat. For several days since their landing, they received no word from the Americans when or if they will receive replacement armor. The 10th battalion commanders and staff were wondering what to do with the two tankless companies once the battalion were assigned to a mission from the Americans, since most of the armor personnel were lightly armed. As the battalion Logistic officer, Liwanag took it upon himself to rectify their precarious dilemma. With the working knowledge how the U.S. Army's logistic supply system functions during Second World War, he knew where he can get the supplies directly to bypass the long chain of bureaucratic red-tape. He requested the battalion commanders, Lt. Col. Mariano Azurin and 2IC Lt. Col. Dionisio S. Ojeda, if he could have several trucks and men, namely tank drivers with commanders, and Tank Company's commander, Captain Conrado D. Yap to accompany him to the 25th Infantry Division headquarters to see what they have available at their supply depot.

When they arrived to the 25th Division HQ, it was a beehive of activity as they were coordinating to secure all sectors of the UN battleline. After explaining directly to the American HQ commanders of the 10th situation, they gave him free rein in the division's supply depot and motor pool to take whatever Major Liwanag needed. Without conferring to his battalion commanders on items they had on hand, he secured the items on site that were available before they were requisitioned to another unit. When he returned, to the surprise of everyone in the battalion, he was able to secure seven M24 Chaffee light tanks as their only replacement armor, and riding behind them were several more truckloads of brand new heavy weapons ranging from machine guns of different variants, bazookas and 81 mm mortars – along with more ammunition and grenades for the entire battalion's needs. There were no available spare Shermans, as all replacement tanks would take several weeks to be shipped in from the US mainland. Along with the trucks carried all the battalion's new winter clothing and gear, which was his first priority items to secure. The Recon Company received the Chaffees, which was a far better light tank compared to their under-gunned, slow, obsolete M5 Stuarts. All the truckloads of new heavy weaponry he collected went to the tankless Tank Company which he reorganize them as a Heavy Weapons Company, which the battalion commander and the Tank Company's commander, Captain Conrado D. Yap, approved to Liwanag's re-assessment. Near the city of Miryang, the battalion spent about two weeks of pre-combat training with their new equipment and their change of combat duties, namely the Heavy Weapons Company. Liwanag became directly responsible in the transition of reshaping the reassigned company and closely working together with Capt. Yap, to ensure that his newly reassigned company functions smoothly.

==== Battle of Yultong ====
On the morning of April 22, the 10th BCT was deployed 5 kilometers north of Yeoncheon amid the Chinese Spring Offensive. They were positioned on the hill on the Yultong area which was a key town in the so-called Iron Triangle, formed by the cities of Chorwon, Kumhwa and Pyonggang. The battalion was moved to the 3rd Infantry Division to reinforce its ranks, which the Chinese 44th Division offensive was to conduct echelons of night attacks to overrun the 10th's hill position. The Filipino battalion was heavily outnumbered 17 to 1 and surrounded, which made every Filipino, from cooks, clerks to drivers, to take up arms and fight whom act on as a reserve force component. Liwanag was the senior artillery officer assigned to lead the field artillery battalion, which was his first artillery command since recently graduating from artillery school.

Both flanks of the 10th position were heavily bombarded with a massive artillery barrage which lasted about four hours in some sectors. The Turkish army on their right side fell victim to the Chinese shelling and were the first to fall back. Five minutes after midnight of April 23, The Chinese 44th Division started their assault on the 10th right flank which is defended by Baker Company. After the Chinese fired mortars, artillery and machine gun fire into the battalion's position, they charged the 10th with the sounds of bugles, whistles and gongs. They repelled them from their defensive position by firing a wall of lead cutting down the large numbers of the enemy. They were assisted also by Able, Heavy Weapons (Tank) and Recon Company using their light tanks. Liwanag provided danger close artillery support using their six 105 mm howitzers and four 81 mm mortars further reducing the Chinese numbers who approached their hill perimeter. They succeeded in holding their ground from the Chinese, but with the large numbers of Chinese flowing into the right flank. It overwhelm the Turkish army by forcing them back even further exposing more of Baker's Company position but they held their ground. The reserve forces of cooks, clerks & drivers we sent to reinforce the line. By 04:00, the Chinese assault came close to a 1000 yards to the battalion command post which was repelled back by Charlie Company.

The US Army Puerto Rican 65th Infantry regiment fell back from a large Chinese assault on their position exposing the 10th left flank. That flank was covered by Heavy Weapons Company, which was overwhelmed by the shear numbers of enemy pouring into their positions that their machine guns were overheating to melt their barrels. Heavy Weapons Company Lt. Jose Artiaga and his platoon were killed while defending their post. Battalion CP ordered Captain Cornado Yap to fall back from their position which he ignored and immediately counterattacked to retake their former position and to retrieve Lt. Artiaga body and the remains of his platoon. Outnumbered, the counterattack surprised the Chinese which succeed in Heavy Weapon Company driving them off the hill top, but Captain Yap was mortally wounded by machine gun fire.

By dawn on April 23, the 10th staged a counterattack using two of their Chaffee light tanks. This surprised the Chinese who was during the time regrouping from the night attack to consolidate their position. The tanks eliminated any Chinese troops they encountered and dislodged any that were entrenched along the hill side. They succeeded in holding their ground from the Chinese, which allowed the withdrawal of allied friendly forces, and continued to hold their ground until they were given the order for their own to withdraw. They were given orders from the US 3rd ID to withdraw earlier, a disengagement the 10th couldn't accomplish while under constant attack from the Chinese and without other UNC units to cover its withdrawal was not logical without suffering heavy casualties themselves.

The battle became the toughest conflict that any PEFTOK Philippine unit participated in during the Korean War and was widely known as their bravest stand. The 10th BCT position in the conflict held the UNC battleline from collapsing, which later the UNC used their position to springboard further up north to push back the Chinese. For their actions, Heavy Weapons (Tank) Company, the company which Liwanag was responsible for their re-tasking, training, and provided their weaponry, was decorated the US Gallantry Award from the US Eighth Army. Their company commander, Captain Cornado Yap, was posthumously awarded the Medal of Valor, the Philippines' highest award for heroism. Lt. Artiaga was posthumously awarded the Distinguished Service Cross for leading his extremely outnumbered men in the most intense account of the Yultong battle. The battles' causality count for the 10th BCT: 10 killed, 26 wounded and 14 men missing in action. Major Liwanag was the ranking officer to preside Captain Yap dockside wake that was attended by fellow UN commanders and officers from multiple nations, before his casket was to be disembarked by ship back to the Philippines.

The 10th BCT earned its unit's name, "The Fighting Filipinos" later called "The Fighting Tenth". They continued to serve until September 27, 1951, when they were replaced by the 20th BCT. The battalion's total casualty count for the war was 43 KIA, 9 MIA, 58 enemy captured. His unit stayed 398 days in Korea and returned to Manila on October 23 to a euphoric hero's welcome.

==== Military attaché ====
Liwanag and several veterans of the 10th BCT decided to extend their combat tour instead of returning home. The Army veterans were reassigned to the 20th BCT, while he was returned to the Philippine Navy in the Korean campaign. Liwanag was assigned as the senior naval advisor to the Philippine Diplomatic Representative for the Philippine Embassy, along with the additional duty of being the Philippine Liaison Officer to United Nations Command Headquarters in Tokyo, Japan. On July 5, 1951, he was promoted to the rank of Commander.

On October 7, 1952, Liwanag was decorated with the Legion of Merit by Maj. Gen. Blackshear M. Bryan deputy chief of staff - HQ Far East Command, for exceptionally meritorious conduct in the performance of outstanding services for the Philippine Liaison office with UN Command. This was in recognition of his actions during his first combat tour of duty with the Philippine Army and his continuance to serve with UN Command on behalf of the Philippine Navy and Embassy. He became the first Filipino Officer under the Philippine Republic to receive this distinguished medal, which is the highest US military decoration to be given to a foreign national.

According to the citation, Commander Liwanag distinguished himself from December 12, 1950, to September 30, 1952. It read in part:

Applying his keen judgment and professional experience, Commander Liwanag formulated plans for the logistical support and efficient integration of Philippine forces into the Korean War. His high sense of duty and spirit of cooperation were contributing factors to the successful integration of the Philippine combat teams as elements of the United Nations Command and reflect great credit on himself and the Philippine Navy.

His Legion of Merit medal currently resides in display at the Philippine Military Academy Museum which was donated by his family.

=== Operation "Bulwark One" ===
In January 1958, Capt. Liwanag was chosen as the overall commander throughout phases II and III of the naval exercise Operation "Bulwark One" or Exercise "Bulwark", a harbor defense maneuver sponsored jointly by the Philippine Navy and US Navy. The naval operation was the first US-Philippine joint exercise since the Philippines' liberation (1946). Its purpose was to acquaint and promote the close working relationship of the US Navy and the Philippine Navy in the defense of Philippine harbors. The exercise was significant in that the ability of a nation to last in a war of any kind, whether nuclear or conventional, would depend upon its ability to protect its shipping life-lines.

For the first time in any joint US-Philippine exercise, all US Navy units during phase II and III was placed under the overall command of a Philippine Navy senior officer, Capt. Emilio Liwanag. According to Lt. Gen Alfonso Arellano, AFP Chief of Staff (1956–1957), he hailed the designation of Liwanag, pointing out that it was the first time that a Filipino officer was chosen to head a vital and big military exercise in which a foreign contingent was participating. Selection of Liwanag, Arellano said, shows only too well the proficiency of the Filipino soldier and the degree of respect and admiration with which he is held by his counterparts abroad.

The exercise was broken down in three different phases in a three-month period:

==== Phase I (Jan. 8) ====
This stage of the exercise, which involves the shore training of participants on techniques and procedures in harbor defense at the base in Cavite. Fifty-six PN officers and three hundred enlisted men had a two-week classroom instruction course on harbor defense to be followed by another two weeks of practical training under competent Filipino and American instructors from Cavite Navy Yard and US Naval Base Subic Bay. After their training, these PN officers and sailors would form the nucleus of the country's first post-war harbor defense unit.

==== Phase II (Feb. 6–15) ====
Consist of drills at the Corregidor and Caballo areas and establishment of a Harbor Defense Command Center. This stage practices operations against enemy air and sub-surface attackers along with protecting friendly shipping lanes. The tactical importance of this phase of this exercise was that in case of a real emergency, Corregidor may be fortified to protect the entire harbor of Manila. The addition of radar, sonar and other harbor defense equipment was set up on Corregidor to improve and upgrade the Harbor defenses, which was provided by the US Navy.

==== Phase III (March 19–22) ====
The actual firing phase where the US-Philippine Navy participant-units focus on Harbor defense operations to protect friendly shipping off Corregidor. This included mine laying operations, surface and underwater detection with radar, sonar, spotting towers and anti-aircraft action. They simulated attacks from a submarine, a disguised merchant ship and an air attack around Corregidor and Caballo islands area. Eight assorted PN vessels and Harbor defense unit will staved off an actual attack of enemy forces played by seven US naval vessels including a submarine. The Philippine Air Force contributed friendly and enemy forces of P-51 Mustangs and F-86 Sabre jets.

==== Conclusion ====
The naval exercise was successful in giving valuable operational training in harbor defense and mine warfare to the participating units and promoted closer working relations among the Philippine Navy, Air Force and the US Navy. This benchmarked some milestones for the Philippine Forces for being the first US-Philippine bilateral harbor defense maneuvers held in the Philippines since the liberation. The first activation of the country's Harbor Defense Unit, and the first Filipino senior officer to command a combined exercise.

The exercise involved fifteen US and Philippine naval vessels: the US Navy provided picket boats, minesweepers - Fortify, Inflict and Engage, a submarine - USS Capitaine (SS-336), aircraft - namely two Martin PBM patrol bombers, several amphibious vehicles (LVT-4) and harbor defense units. The Philippine Navy provided minesweepers, coast guard crafts (CGC)s, a patrol craft - RPS Cebu (currently BRP Cebu (PS-28) which was later reclassified as a corvette-class under the PN) and signal check stations on Corregidor. The Philippine Air Force provided four squadrons consisting of eight P-51 Mustangs, four F-86 Sabre jets, four HU-16 Albatross amphibious flying boats and helicopter rescue teams.

The success also led to the procurement of equipment used by the US Navy for this exercise. US military observers which included Maj. Gen. Joseph Harper, Joint United States Military Assistance Group (JUSMAG) chief, and Rear Admiral Edgar A. Cruise, commander US Naval Forces - Philippines, were impressed and praised the conduct of the exercise. Admiral Cruise turned over six amphibious tractors to Commodore Jose Francisco, PN chief, which will be allocated to the Philippine Marines.

Maj. General Harper turned over the equipment and facilities used in the harbor defense operations. These equipment and installations include mobile and stationary radar units, magnetic control mines, hydrophones and magnetic indicator loops, which are mostly designed for detecting approaching surface and subsurface vessels, all worth about two million (US-1958) dollars.

=== Naval Anti-Smuggling campaign ===
During 1958–61, President Carlos P. Garcia created the Presidential Enforcement Unit for Southern Philippines (PLEUSP) which was to eradicate rampant violations of customs, revenue and immigration laws in the south of the Philippines. These violations deprived the government of substantial revenues and provided ruinous competition to legitimate business that would hinder the national economy.

Captain Liwanag was the commander of the naval unit, Task Force 10, which served as the executing arm of the naval element of the PLEUSP group. The Task Force was to stop, seize and confiscate all vessels, cargo and contraband that enters Philippine's territorial waters illegally. He was in charge of securing the southernmost territorial boundaries because of Indonesia was a launch point and the main source of most of the smuggling operations. This also included the duty of preventing Indonesian communist elements from infiltrating through Mindanao and Sulu regions. In 1960–61, he became the commander of the Navy's Service Force, which is responsible for preparing auxiliary transport and amphibious ships dedicated for sea lift and amphibious operations.

During 1962–63, Liwanag was appointed as the 3rd commandant of the Naval Operating Force (NOF) which is the main fighting element of the Philippine Navy. The Naval Operating Forces were composed of units of a Marine Battalion, Underwater Operations unit, Naval Air unit and a Small Craft unit. During his command, he carried out and continued a more stringent anti-smuggling campaign in continuance of the PLEUSP group which was carried over under President Diosdado Macapagal administration. More smuggling operations were uncovered and intercepted from the country's southern coastal waters while further enforcing its territorial waterways from any incursions.

== Retirement and personal life ==
After 25 years of active service, Captain Liwanag was placed on the retired list from active duty on December 11, 1963. After his retirement, he was placed as a Naval Reserve Officer with the Ready Reserve Force until 1965. He was awarded the Distinguished Service Star medal, conferred by Commodore Juan B. Magluyan, Philippine Navy Chief. His citation read in part,

for eminently meritorious and valuable service to the Navy while Commander of the Service Force and Commander of the Naval Operating Force.

He was cited for promoting the professional growth of the Navy, for being instrumental in the unrelenting law enforcement campaign around the archipelago and for successful implementation of the Republic of the Philippines–Indonesia border patrol agreement. He was married to Caridad Buenconsejo (May 25, 1911 - October 8, 1992). They have seven children—four sons and three daughters—and survived by two sons and three daughters. One of his sons was named after him, and though his grandson did not take his name, his great-grandson Emilio Jose Liwanag did.

Liwanag died from liver failure (cirrhosis) on April 12, 1967, at the Victoriano Luna General Hospital. He is buried at the Libingan ng mga Bayani (Cemetery of Heroes) in Fort Bonifacio (Flat H, Row 10, Sec. 12).

== Medals and decorations ==
Distinguished Service Star
Legion of Merit (USA)
Philippine Defense Medal
Philippine Liberation Medal with one Bronze Service Star
Philippine Independence Medal
Distinguished Unit Badge (currently called Presidential Unit Citation) with two Bronze Service Star (USA)
Philippine Republic Presidential Unit Citation Badge
Philippine Anti-Dissidence Campaign Medal
Asiatic-Pacific Campaign Medal (USA)
American Defense Service Medal with two Bronze Service Star (USA)
World War II Victory Medal (USA)
United Nations Service Medal (UN)
Korean War Service Medal with one Bronze Service Star
Long Service Medal with one Bronze Service Star

== Legacy ==
=== Naval Station Emilio Liwanag ===
On July 7, 2009, the Philippine Navy commemorated its naval history by honoring several naval officers who served with distinction, who fought for the protection of the country's sovereignty, territorial integrity, democracy, and the maritime interests of the country. With that honor, Naval Station Pag-Asa on Thitu island in the Kalayaan Islands which is part of the province of Palawan was renamed Naval Station Emilio Liwanag as one of several bases, facilities, and stations renamed thru-out the country. Location: 11.05316°N 114.28484°E

=== BRP Emilio Liwanag (PC-118) ===
In May 2010, the 112th Anniversary of the Philippine Navy, a newly commissioned Patrol Gunboat PG-118 was christened as BRP Emilio Liwanag in his honor. The ship was originally PKM 223, a Chamsuri class patrol boat used by the South Korean Navy in the 1970s, which was acquired in 2006 along with PKM 232. The PKMs (Patrol Killer Medium) are the earlier series of the Chamsuri class vessels, which were manufactured by the Hanjin Industrial SB, Chinhae and Korean SB & Eng. Masan shipyards. These vessels were procured under the Revised Re-prioritized Project List (RRPL) of the Capability Upgrade Program (CUP) in line with the PN Moderization Program. It will undergo an extensive refurbishing and modernization upgrades under the Armed Forces Philippines (AFP) Modernization Program before joining the Naval fleet's inventory which will be completed by Propmech Corporation.

On the morning of January 4, 2011, a newly upgraded patrol gunboat BRP Emilio Liwanag (PG-118) is the latest addition to join the Philippine Navy's floating inventory. Leading the ceremony at Navy Headquarters, Secretary Voltaire T. Gazmin witnessed by officers and personnel of the Philippine Navy, together with Mrs. Emilia Liwanag Hilado, youngest daughter of the late Capt. Emilio S. Liwanag. The newly restored and registered Tomas Batilo class is the 7th patrol gunboat that was refurbished and modernized since its purchase back in 2006.

The gunboat's overall refurbishment includes upgrades to its communications equipment, replacement of the old original engines with two new Caterpillar 3516C engines @ 3386 bhp, and enhancement of the electrical & auxiliary machinery. The vessel has a maximum speed of 31 knots and is capable of the following: surface and air action against enemy forces; interdiction patrol; sealift of platoon size troops with full combat gears in the conduct of ISO; search and rescue within territorial waters; transport of personnel, cargo and civic action operations. The ship is equipped with a Koden Electronics MDC 1500 Series navigation and surface search radar, which replaced the previously installed radar.

On April 15, 2011, PG-118 has been officially commissioned into active duty during 73rd anniversary of the Philippine Naval Fleet by Secretary Voltaire T. Gazmin. Ceremories took place at Sangley Point in Cavite City.

In April 2016, BRP Emilio Liwanag patrol craft was reclassified as PC-118. This change was in accordance to keep in line with the Philippine Navy Standard Operating Procedures #08.

Armored plates were added to the ship's Bridge windows in 2019 as it patrols coastal area of Mindanao as part of the PN Littoral Combat Force.

BRP Emilio Liwanag was finally decommissioned on March 1, 2021, as part the Navy's phase-in, phase-out program which calls for the retirement of old vessels as newer vessels replace them. PC-118 was retired alongside BRP Salvador Abcede (PC-114) as the last of the two remaining Tomas Batilo class to be struck off the Philippine Navy ship register. Decommission ceremony was attended by the ship's officers and crew along with two members of the Liwanag family which took place at Navy Headquarters, Heracleo Alano Naval Base in Sangley Point, Cavite City.

== See also ==
- Philippines campaign (1941–1942)
- Philippines Campaign (1944-45)
- Battle of Bataan
- Battle of Manila
- Korean War
- Philippine Expeditionary Forces to Korea (PEFTOK)
- Philippine Army
- Philippine Navy
