= 14th Battalion Combat Team (Philippines) =

Philippine military unit (1946–1955)

- Active: 1946–1955
- Country: Philippines
- Allegiance: Philippine Army
- Branch: Army
- Type: Infantry Battalion
- Role: Infantry
- Size: 1,560
- Part of: PEFTOK
- Garrison/HQ: Camp Murphy, Quezon City, Philippines
- Nickname: Avenger
- Motto: Crush 'Em!
- Engagements: Battle of Christmas Hill
- Decorations: Presidential Distinguished Unit Citation (Korea); Presidential Unit Citation (Philippines)

Commanders
- Notable commanders: Lieutenant Colonel Nicanor Jimenez

14th Battalion Combat Team is a Philippine Army unit activated in 1946 to conduct Anti-Hukbalahap campaign. It was selected to be the fourth contingent of PEFTOK to replace 19th Battalion Combat Team.

== Background ==
The battalion was established in 1946 when Philippine Army was rebuilding the World War. The threat of Communist and its armed wing Hukbalahap was spread throughout Luzon and western Visayas. The Army organized its units to several battalion combat team to make it flexible.

=== Korean War ===
Battalion was selected to be part of Philippine Expeditionary Forces to Korea (PEFTOK) and was sent to Korea to replace 19th Battalion Combat Team after a year of deployment there.

=== Battle of Christmas Hill ===
On July 14 BCT was involved in a five day battle against the communist. From July 18 to 20 it received artillery and mortar barrage in preparation for Infantry assault at their position. In July 19 was original schedule of Chinese to launch massive infantry assault however it was aborted due to 14th BCT return fire with their 105mm Howitzers and mortars which prevent the enemy to move forward.

=== Armistice ===
The Korean War Armistice was signed on July 27, 1953, ending the active fighting of the Korean War. It established a ceasefire and created the Korean Demilitarized Zone (DMZ) as a buffer zone between North and South Korea. Allied units are now on relegated to guard this zone.

The Battalion return to the Philippines on March 1954 and was awarded Presidential Unit Citation. It received same award from Korean Government last December 1953.

== Home and reorganization ==
After returning home the BCT resumed anti-Huks campaign and in 1960s it was reorganized as 14th Infantry Battalion. It is currently deployed and operation in eastern Visayas region part of 802nd Infantry Brigade of 8th Infantry Division.

== See also ==
- Korean War
- Philippine Expeditionary Forces to Korea
- 19th Battalion Combat Team
- Battle of Christmas Hill
