= BRP Conrado Yap =

BRP Conrado Yap is the name of the following ships of the Philippine Navy, named for Conrado Yap:

- BRP Conrado Yap (PG-840), a Conrado Yap-class patrol craft, decommissioned
- BRP Conrado Yap (PS-30), a Pohang-class corvette acquired by the Philippine Navy in 2019
