= Reynaldo Mendoza =

Filipino military officer and Korean war veteran

Reynaldo Arce Mendoza
- Born: March 24, 1917; Aparri, Cagayan Valley, Philippine Islands
- Died: June 4, 2001 (aged 84)
- Buried: Himlayang Pilipino Memorial Park
- Allegiance: Philippines
- Rank: Brigadier General
- Commands: 2nd Battalion Combat Team, PEFTOK; Philippine Military Academy
- Known for: PMA, Oh Hail to Thee (lyrics)
- Conflicts: Fall of the Philippines; Korean War
- Awards: Korean War Hero Medal; Distinguished Service Stars; Military Merit Medals; Philippine Republic Presidential Unit Citation; United States Presidential Unit Citation; Republic of Korea Presidential Unit Citation; Ulchi Distinguished Military Service Medal
- Alma mater: Philippine Military Academy; United States Army Armor School; University of Santo Tomas; University of the Philippines; Command and General Staff College; Dwight D. Eisenhower School for National Security and Resource Strategy
- Other name: Rey Mendoza
- Organization(s): PMA, ISAFP, SEATO, NDCP, NICA, AFP
- Notable work: Leadership for Filipinos (co-author), 1956

Reynaldo Arce Mendoza (24 March 1917 - 4 June 2001) was a Philippine Army brigadier general. He was a member of the class of 1940, the author of the Alma Mater song "PMA, Oh Hail to Thee," and former Superintendent of the Philippine Military Academy (PMA). He was also the former Chief of the Intelligence Service of the Armed Forces of the Philippines (ISAFP) and President of the National Defense College of the Philippines (NDCP). During his military service, Mendoza had received several awards and decorations including three Distinguished Service Stars and Presidential Unit Citations from the Philippines, the United States, and the Republic of Korea. He was also recipient of the Ulchi Distinguished Military Service Medal and the Korean War Hero Medal for his command of the 2nd Battalion Combat Team (BCT) of the Philippine Expeditionary Forces to Korea (PEFTOK).

== Military career ==
=== Philippine Military Academy ===
Reynaldo Mendoza is a member of the Philippine Military Academy Class 1940, which was the first class to complete four years of training as cadets in the academy. Out of 120 cadets who were admitted in the academy in 1936, only 79 graduated in 1940. A year after their graduation, they would be called upon to serve in the United States Army Forces in the Far East (USAFFE) to fight against the Japanese invasion.

==== PMA, Oh Hail to Thee ====
The PMA alma mater song, "PMA, Oh Hail to Thee" was composed by Class '40 batchmates, Quirico Evangelista (music) and Reynaldo Mendoza (lyrics).

The words of the anthem profess the persistent safeguard of personal honor as the absolute duty of each cadet. All cadets and cavaliers of the academy have to memorize the lyrics and sing the song correctly.

=== World War II ===
When World War II broke out, Reynaldo Mendoza was an intelligence officer of the 1st Coast Artillery Battalion. During the Japanese occupation of the Philippines, he was a prisoner of war from 1943 to 1944 in Camp O'Donnell, arriving there via the Bataan Death March.

Throughout the campaign to liberate the country from Imperial Japanese forces from 1944 to 1945, Mendoza served in the United States Army Forces in the Philippines – Northern Luzon (USAFIP-NL) Guerilla Unit as a staff officer.

=== Philippine Expeditionary Forces to Korea (PEFTOK) ===
The Philippines was the third United Nations member country (after the United States and the United Kingdom), and the first Asian nation, to send combat troops to the Korean War in 1950.

The Philippines Expeditionary Forces to Korea served in the Korean War. From 1950 to 1955, five Battalion Combat Teams (BCT) served in Korea. Reynaldo Mendoza led the 2nd BCT. This battalion was one of the most combat-experienced in the anti-Huk campaign. It arrived in Korea in April 1954 and trained in new weapons and combat techniques. It extended peacekeeping and reconstruction work while providing humanitarian aid to South Koreans. Mendoza succeeded commander Colonel Antonio de Veyra.

=== Intelligence Agencies, PMA, and NDCP ===
After the Korean War, Reynaldo Mendoza would proceed to assume several public service positions in education, research, and intelligence agencies. With Luciano Gunabe, he wrote Leadership for Filipinos, a book intended for the military, in 1956. Mendoza was the Chief of Intelligence (G-2) and Commanding Officer of the Intelligence Service of the Armed Forces of the Philippines (ISAFP) from 1959 to 1962. He then assumed the post of deputy director in the National Intelligence Coordinating Agency (NICA) for the next two years. He also chaired the South East Asia Treaty Organization's (SEATO) 6th Meeting of Security Experts in Bangkok.

In 1964, he became the 4th President of the National Defense College of the Philippines. In 1966, he was appointed as the new Superintendent of the Philippine Military Academy (PMA). In this same year, on September 11, he was promoted by President Marcos from Colonel to Brigadier General.

=== Retirement ===
On August 15, 1967, President Marcos retired the services of Reynaldo Mendoza, together with seven other generals, who were holding commands in the Armed Forces of the Philippines (AFP), but were serving past the compulsory retirement period, as part of a major revamp of the armed forces.

From 1972 to 1981, the Philippines was under martial law of Ferdinand Marcos. Mendoza was already retired but had not lost his influence. When Mendoza's nephew was arrested and abused by the Marcos' military forces, he recounted that the torture stopped after the Constabulary Security Unit's head, who used to serve under Mendoza, found out about their kinship. In 1985, Marcos signed the Administrative Order 501 to create a Board of Generals and Colonels that will study the reorganization of the AFP. The Board included Fidel Ramos and Fabian Ver, among others, and retired generals like Mendoza and Ernesto Mata. They acted as an advisory body to the President on policy matters affecting the organization and management of military resources.

When President Aquino came to power in 1986, several coup attempts were plotted against her during the first four years of her presidency. Mendoza and other members of his class opposed the coups and refused to participate in them despite being asked to.

== Decorations and Honors ==
Throughout his military career, Reynaldo Mendoza received three Distinguished Service Stars, four Military Merit Medals, two Philippine Presidential Unit Citations, two US Presidential Unit Citations, a Korean Republic Presidential Unit Citation, two Long Service Medals, several campaign medals from the Philippines and the US, and the Ulchi Distinguished Military Service Medal (second highest decoration awarded by the Republic of Korea for military merit) for his service as commander of the 2nd BCT during the Korean War.

At a special ceremony marking the 60th anniversary of the Korean War in 2010, Mendoza was one of the 14 Filipinos honored with the Korean War Hero Medal, presented by the Republic of Korea for their contributions during the Korean War. Other notable awardees include former president Fidel Ramos, the late Senator Ninoy Aquino Jr., and Captain Conrado Yap.

The PEFTOK Korean War Memorial Hall, where names of all the Filipinos who served in Korea from 1950 to 1955 are displayed on floor panels, was inaugurated on March 29, 2012.

== Personal life and education ==
Reynaldo Mendoza was born in Aparri, Cagayan Valley, Philippines. He is the son of Martin Sanidad Mendoza and Esperanza Arce. He has 5 children with his wife Lilia Moran. When he died in June 2001, he was entitled to be buried in the Libingan ng mga Bayani but he preferred to be buried next to his kin at the Himlayang Pilipino Memorial Park.

=== Alma Mater ===
Mendoza's education consisted of the following:

1936 – 1940 Philippine Military Academy, Baguio, Philippines

1947 – 1948 Armored Force School (now the United States Army Armor School), Fort Knox, Kentucky, USA

1949 – 1950 University of Santo Tomas, Philippines

1950 – 1951 University of the Philippines

1958 Command & General Staff College, Ft Leavenworth, Kansas, USA 1958

1961 Industrial College of the Armed Forces (now Dwight D. Eisenhower School for National Security and Resource Strategy), D.C., USA
