= Negros Force =

Former Philippine Army unit

- Active: September 1, 1941 – May 12, 1942
- Disbanded: May 12, 1942
- Countries: United States; Philippine Commonwealth
- Allegiance: United States Army
- Branch: Army, navy, air corps
- Type: Infantry
- Role: Territorial defense
- Size: 2,500
- Part of: Visayan Force
- Garrison/HQ: La Castellana, Negros Occidental

Commanders
- Notable commanders: Colonel Roger Hilsman, USA; Colonel Carter McClennan, USA; Lieutenant Colonel Gabriel Gador, PA (Acting); |Colonel Eugene Mitchell, USA

Negros Force was a WWII-era Philippine Army unit activated by the United States Army Forces in the Far East (USAFFE) from September 1, 1941, to May 12, 1942. The force did not fight during the war but played a role in organizing units deployed to different sectors. The force also continued to fight as a guerilla force after the war. The two provinces on the island were never united during the conflict, due to the different affiliations of their commanders.

== Background ==
It was organized after the 71st Infantry Division was ordered to be transferred to Luzon. The only remaining combat unit that remained on Negros Island was the 73rd Infantry Regiment under Major Robert H. Vessey. USAFFE Headquarters ordered the 61st Infantry Division to transfer the 61st Infantry Regiment to Negros in October 1941 to take up the defense of Negros Occidental. The two infantry regiments on the island had a lack of weapons and ammunition, and had no artillery pieces.

Training went ahead for both regiments when the war in the Philippines commenced on December 8, 1941, when Clark Air Base and other military installations in Luzon were bombed. On January 4, 1942 the Visayas-Mindanao Force (VMF) commander, Brigadier General William F. Sharp, ordered both the 73rd and 61st Infantry Regiments to transfer to Mindanao Island via Iligan. These regiments left for Mindanao on January 5, 1942. Only trainees and the Philippine Commonwealth (PC) Companies for Negros Occidental and Negros Oriental were left on the island.

Lieutenant Colonel Gabriel Gador of the Philippine Army and commander of the 7th Military District assumed command and took action in organizing the two infantry regiments as the 74th and 75th Provisional Infantry Regiments.

== Order of battle, January 1942 ==
- 74th Provisional Infantry Regiment – Major Sam C. Jones
  - 1st Battalion – Major Benjamin Roque
  - 2nd Battalion – Major Francisco Gomez
  - 3rd Battalion – Major Ernesto Mata
- 75th Provisional Infantry Regiment – Lieutenant Colonel Tiburcio Ballesteros
  - 1st Battalion – 1st Lieutenant Feliciano Señeres
  - 2nd Battalion – 1st Lieutenant Antonio Romero
- Negros Occidental PC Company - Lieutenant Colonel Eduardo Mantilla
- Negros Oriental PC Company – Lieutenant Colonel Licerio Balolong
- 7th Military District – Major Salvador Abcede and Lieutenant Colonel Gabriel Gador

=== Commanders ===
When under the 71st Infantry Division the island had no single commander; although Colonel Eugene Mitchell was the senior officer on the island, he was only authorized to command the 61st Infantry, which covered Negros Occidental. Major Vessey commanded the 73rd Infantry which covered the southeast part of the island. Lieutenant Colonel Gador assumed command when the 73rd and 61st Infantry left for Mindanao, however he was ordered to move to Mindanao and the VMF sent Colonel Roger Hilsman to command on February 8, 1942. Due to his failing health, General Bradford Chynoweth ordered Hilsman to Cebu to become his chief of staff and access medical services. Chynoweth ordered Colonel Carter McLennan from Panay to move to Negros to take command. A day after Hilsman moved to Cebu the Japanese invaded it, and after two days the command was lost. Hilsman crossed back to Negros to assume command. McLennan being his junior became the executive officer, but by the time the Visayan Force surrendered it was McLennan who acted as commander.

=== Staff ===
In January 1942, Sharp ordered Gador to assume command of Negros. Gador assembled his staff: 1st Lieutenant Ceferino Martinez as Adjutant; Ballesteros as Quartermaster Officer; Captain Romeo Intengan, Finance Officer; Captain Francisco Serrano, Medical Officer; 1st Lieutenant Augusto Alfonso, Engineer Officer; 1st Lieutenant Eligio Cruz, Censor Officer; and 1st Lieutenant Fidel Soliven Jr., Detachment Commander (Internee Camp).

In March, when Hilsman assumed command of Negros he reassembled his staff for Negros Force, with Major Balolong as Executive Officer, Captain Sinforoso Menchavez as Adjutant and G1; Captain Francisco Gomez G2; Major Salvador Abcede as G3 Operations Officer, Major Vicente Geroso, G4. Ballesteros became Inspector General, Intengan, Finance Officer; Serrano, Medical Officer; and Alfonso, Engineer Officer. Later McClellan was ordered to transfer to Negros and assumed Balolong as Executive Officer.

On orders of General Chynoweth, Hilsman was transferred to Cebu to become his chief of staff in late March. McClellan assumed the position of acting commander and Balolong resumed as Executive Officer. Major Sinforoso Menchavez as Adjutant and G1; Mantilla, G2 and G3; Geroso, G4; Intengan, Finance Officer; Serrano, Medical Officer; Alfonso, Engineer Officer; Jones, CO of the 74th Infantry; and Ballesteros, CO of the 75th Infantry.

== President and vice president stop-over ==
The most important event that took place on the island was the President and Vice President of the Philippine Commonwealth stopping over from Corregidor. President Manuel Quezon aboard the Princess of Negros docked in Pulupandan, Negros Occidental on March 14, 1942, followed by Vice President Sergio Osmeña on March 15. The stopover created a fuss among the commanders due to the safety of the dignitaries and their parties. Among them were Philippine Commonwealth Army Chief of Staff Major General Basilio Valdes and the President's family. No one advised the President to leave as soon as possible for Mindanao despite intensified Japanese activities in Visayan waters. On March 15 Chynoweth, commander of the newly-created Visayan Force, passed through Negros to establish a headquarters in Cebu. Hilsman met him at Pulupandan port and brought his concerns about the President's presence on the island to Chynoweth, who promised to message the President after reaching Cebu.

In March 16, just as Chynoweth disembarked from a ferry in Toledo, Cebu, a cruiser appeared and shelled both Toledo and San Carlos, Negros Occidental. The Princess of Negros was docked in San Carlos and was captured by the Japanese. The incident gave proof to Hilsman's concern for the President and his party to leave the island as soon as possible for safety. Chynoweth sent a message from Cebu to Hilsman to be conveyed to the President to leave the island immediately. This did not sit well with the President, who "went berserk" on Chynoweth, but the trip had already been arranged with United States Forces in the Philippines coordination.

The President and his party crossed to Mindanao using PT boats of Motor Torpedo Boat Squadron Six under Lieutenant Bulkeley. Due to the hastily arranged departure and limited space on the PT boat, some of the luggage was left at the port in Dumaguete. The President and his party landed in Oroquieta, Misamis Occidental the following morning. This relieved Hilsman and his troops to continue training and preparation.

== Order of battle, February 1942 ==
- 74th Provisional Infantry Regiment – Major Samuel Jones
  - 1st Battalion – Major Angel Okol
  - 2nd Battalion – Major Gomez and Major Salvador Abcede
  - 3rd Battalion – Major Ernesto Mata
- 75th Provisional Infantry Regiment – Lieutenant Colonel Ballesteros and Major Roque
  - 1st Battalion – Major Pulong Arpa and 1st Lieutenant Señeres
  - 2nd Battalion – Major Benjamin Ignacio
- Negros Occidental PC Company – Lieutenant Colonel Mantilla
- Negros Oriental PC Company – Lieutenant Colonel Balolong
- 7th Military District – Major Salvador Abcede and Lieutenant Colonel Gabriel Gador

Hilsman arrived on the island on February 8, 1942, from VMF Headquarters to take command, and immediately reorganized the Negros Force. He had been commanding the defense force in Davao City in mid-December 1941. Gador was ordered to Mindanao by the VMF, and Abcede took over command of the 7th Military District.

== Japanese invasion of Visayas ==
On April 9, 1942 the Japanese Kawaguchi Detachment left Lingayen Gulf for Cebu with 11 transports escorted by 3 destroyers and 2 cruisers. On April 16, 1942 the Kawamura Detachment left Lingayen to secure the island of Panay. When Cebu island was secured, the 10th Independent Garrison took over there as well as on Panay, leaving the Kawamura and Kawaguchi Detachments free for operations at the island of Mindanao.

=== Surrender ===
The Japanese commander in Cebu sent emissaries to Negros discuss surrender but Hilsman rejected them. However, an order to surrender from the VMF was received at Negros Force headquarters on May 12, 1942. All commanders were ordered to surrender along with their men, but Abcede and Ernesto Mata did not surrender; they escaped to the mountains and continued to fight as guerillas.

== See also ==
- Cebu Brigade
- Leyte Brigade
- Visayan Force
