= 10th Battalion Combat Team (Philippines) =

- Active: 1948 – 1955
- Country: Philippines
- Allegiance: Philippine Army
- Branch: Army
- Type: Heavy Weapons Motorized Battalion Combat Team
- Role: Mechanized Infantry
- Size: 64 Officers; 1,303 Enlisted Personnel
- Part of: Philippine Army; PEFTOK
- Garrison/HQ: Camp Murphy, Quezon City
- Nicknames: Fighting Filipinos Fighting Tenth Royal 10th BCT
- Motto: Steady On
- Equipment: M1911 Colt .45 Pistols M1928A1, M1 and M1A1 Thompson .45ACP Submachineguns; M3 Colt .45ACP Submachineguns; M1 Saginaw .30 Caliber Carbine; M1 Garand Rifles; M1903 Springfield .30 Caliber Sniper Rifles; M1918 Browning Automatic Rifles; M1919A3 Browning .30 Caliber Machineguns; M2 Browning .50 Caliber Heavy Machineguns; M1 Hand Grenades; M2 60mm Mortars; M1 81mm Mortars; M1 57mm Bazooka; M2 76mm Super Bazooka; M2 105mm Howitzers; M45 Quadmount 50 Caliber; M24 Chaffee Light Tanks; M5 Half Trucks, Willy MB Jeeps; M5 10-ton trucks M4 Sherman Tanks; M7 Priestly Tank Destroyer M12 Self Propelled
- Engagements: Battle of Miudong Battle of Imjin River Battle of Yultong
- Decorations: South Korean Presidential Unit Citation; Philippine Presidential Unit Citation
- Battle honours: Presidential Unit Citation (Korea) President Unit Citation (Philippines); Gallantry Award (8th US Army) Battle Citation (X US Corps)

Commanders
- Notable commanders: LCol. Mariano Azurin LCol. Dionisio Ojeda; Maj. Delfin Argao; LCdr. Emilio Liwanag; Capt. Manuel Aguilar; Capt. Manuel Robles; Capt. Paulino Sanchez; Capt. Maximo Dumlao; Capt. Conrado Yap; 1Lt. Jose Artiaga; 1Sgt. Maximo P. Young; 1Lt. Victoriano Yapchanco; 2Lt. Francis Tamondong; 2Lt. Venancio Serrano 1Lt. Erdulfo G. Pagala

10th Battalion Combat Team, is a unit of the Philippine Army in 1950 who fought during Philippine Government Anti-Dissident campaign against Hukbalahap but it gained fame during Korean War when it was sent to Korea as first contingent deployed of Philippine Expeditionary Forces to Korea (PEFTOK) in 1950.

== Organization ==
The Philippine Army organized in 1946 its combat units into Battalion Combat Team to combat the communist insurgency of Hukbalahap. In 1950 the battalion was considered as the best trained unit of the Philippine Army. The battalion was trained in Camp Marikorea in Marikina before it was sent to Korea.

== Korean War ==
In 1950, President Elpidio Quirino responded to the call of UN to raise and contribute a combat unit to UN command in Korea. This was in order to help the beleaguered South Korea which was already cornered in the Pusan Perimeter by North Korean troops. With 1,303 Enlisted men and 64 Officers, comprises HQ & HQ Company, 3 Rifle Companies (Able, Baker, & Charlie) under Captain Maximo C. Dumlao, Paulino E. Sanchez, and Mariano Aguilar respectively. Combat Support Companies (Recon, Tank, Artillery Companies) under Captains Mariano C. Robles, Conrado Yap, and LCdr. Emilio Liwanag, PN. They left Manila on September 15, 1950 .The battalion and arrived on September 19, 1950, in Pusan port. They were the first Asian combat unit who arrived in Korea. Initially commanded by Colonel Mariano Azurin, who is a tank commander, the unit was trained in mechanized warfare and expected to fight as mechanized unit with Major Delfin Argao, as executive officer. The battalion's tank company is equipped with 29 M4 Sherman Medium Tanks and 10 M5 Stuart Light Tanks a left behind by the American during World War II. Artillery Battery is equipped with 6 M2A1 105mm Howitzers.

When the UN request came in, Philippines deployed 16 M4 Sherman and 1 M18 Hellcat Tank Destroyer. A small armored force was sent ahead under 2Lieutenant Francisco Tamondong and 2 NCOs in July 1950 to augment the allied armored force.

However, it was reported that these tanks were destroyed during the succeeding battles nothing was left to be return. They believed Americans will provide the 28 Light and Medium Tanks as agreed but only 7 M24 Chaffee Light Tanks was provided and no winter clothing. The Tank Company under Captain Condrado Yap shifted to Heavy Weapons as no tanks arrived.

=== Guerilla warfare ===
The first mission given to 10th BCT was to secure the Main Supply Route (MSR). After North Koreans retreated to the North, they left saboteurs and stragglers to fight as guerillas and distorted the supply lines. However, 10th BCT is an experienced unit in anti-guerilla warfare when deployed to fight the huks. They were engaged in fighting the guerillas at Waegwan area, covering 800 square miles that harbored 3,000 guerillas, the battalion deployed in anti-guerilla operations during its first six months of its tour in Korea. Private Alipio Secillano of Lisbon Albay, was killed near the Naktong River in one of their anti-guerilla patrols.

=== Battle of Miudong ===
The first engagement the 10th BCT involved was the Battle of Miudong (Syngy), where elements of the battalion was sent to clear the supply route from Pusan to Seoul of North Koreans. Recon Platoon under then First Sergeant Maximo P. Young, a World War II veteran who was leading the way with 4 M24 Chaffee Light Tanks supported by Able and Baker Companies.

They were ambushed in Miudong by North Koreans, one of their trucks hit a land mine and received small arms bullets. Lieutenant Young, with his combat experience set in and he observed through its tank's periscope the situation. Seeing his comrades were not moving, he went out of the tank and manned the mounted machine gun at the top and began firing it to the ambushers, killing and wounding the North Koreans. Seeing and inspired by his action, men of Able and Baker companies moved out of their positions and began firing and maneuvering, resulting in high casualties. This resulted to 40 killed and several wounded and captured by North Koreans but the Recon Platoon lost 1 man and other companies received 2 wounded.

=== Azurin relieved ===
Upon arrival, the battalion was immediately taken under the control of Brigadier General Frank S. Bowen Jr., commander of 187th Airborne Regimental Combat Team, which was in violation of the military agreements. The control of 4 Companies was transferred to General Bowen leaving Colonel Azurin the battalion commander with the HQ & HQ Company and Medical Detachment. As combat leader Azurin was determined to have his battalion fight as one unit not being farmed out piecemeal to other commands. Another issue he raised was the lack of winter clothing as his troops went out of action due to pneumonia, frostbite, and trench foot. This pushed him to send a front-line report to the Philippines that made President Quirino send Senator Macario Peralta to do on the spot investigation. This complaint reached General Douglas MacArthur's headquarters and 8th US Army Commander Lieutenant General Walton Walker's headquarters. He was summoned to explain his complaints. Colonel Azurin refusal to send his battalion to combat without proper gear and winter clothing then he was relieved and ordered to go home. The command of the battalion was transferred to Lieutenant Colonel Dionisio Ojeda, but Azurin's protestation made way for the battalion to be provided with what they needed.

=== Back home ===
10th Battalion Combat Team was replaced by 20th Battalion Combat Team and returned to the Philippines on October 21, 1951, in the frontline. They incurred 266 casualties, 63 Killed, 145 wounded, and 58 missing in action, the highest casualty toll among all five PEFTOK BCTs. On May 5, 1952, the battalion's dead returned to the Philippines and buried at the Libingan ng mga Bayani. The Battalion receives Presidential Unit Citation from both Republic of Korea and the Philippines. The unit was also decorated X Corps Battle Citation and 8th US Army Gallantry Award.

== Post Korean War ==
After reorganization of the Philippine Army in the 1960s, the BCTs are organized into division and brigades. 10th BCT was relegated to infantry battalion. Today, 10th Infantry Battalion, although not a combat team, retains its motto "Steady On". Based in Misamis Occidental under 102nd Brigade under 1st Infantry (Tabak) Division. Involved in Anti-Rebellion operations with both CPP-NPA and Moro secessionist.

== Notable members ==
- Maximo P. Young, First Sergeant of Recon Company. one of the two recipient of South Korea's highest military award in the battalion. A world war 2 veteran and Silver Star recipient.
- Emilio Liwanag, the only naval officer in the battalion.
- Dionisio Ojeda, replaced Azurin as battalion commander, commanded the battalion during battle of yultong.
- Mariano Azurin, first commander of the battalion. His action and sacrifice gave the battalion proper attention and equipment to fight.
- Conrado Yap, second recipient of South Korea's highest military award.
- Boni Serrano, a platoon leader who is legendary due to his exploits including capturing 77 Chinese soldiers during his nighttime raid.
- Sgt. Nicolas Mahusay - Received Philippines' Gold Cross Medal posthumously.

== See also ==
- Philippine Expeditionary Forces to Korea (PEFTOK)
- Battle of Yultong
- Battle of Imjin River
