= 20th Battalion Combat Team (Philippines) =

- Active: 1948 - 1955
- Country: Republic of the Philippines
- Allegiance: Republic of the Philippines
- Branch: Army
- Type: Infantry
- Role: Infantry Battalion
- Size: 1,383; FA Battery (6x 105mm Howitzers)
- Part of: Philippine Expeditionary Forces to Korea
- Garrison/HQ: Camp Marikorea, Marikina, Rizal
- Nickname: Leaders
- Motto: We Lead
- Equipment: M1911 Colt Pistol M1911 Colt Trench Shotgun; M1 Saginaw Carbines; M1903 Springfield Sniper Rifles; M1 Garand Rifles; M1918 Browning Automatic Rifles; M1928A1, M1 and M1A1 Thompson Submachineguns; M1 Saginaw Carbines; M3 Colt Submachinegun; M1919A3 Browning Machineguns; M2 Browning Heavy Machineguns; M1 60mm Mortars; M2 81mm Mortars; M1 57mm Bazooka; M1 76mm Super Bazooka; M101 105mm Howitzers; M5 10-ton Transport Trucks M3 Half Trucks M3 Scout Cars Willy MB Jeeps
- Engagements: Battle of Hill Eerie Battle of Arsenal Hill Battle of Hill 191
- Decorations: Philippine Presidential Unit Citation; Korean Presidential Unit Citation

Commanders
- Notable commanders: Salvador Abcede Felizardo Tanabe; Fidel V. Ramos; Benjamin Santos; Jose Almonte; Mariano Abaygar Rodrigo Sarmiento

20th Battalion Combat Team, is a combat unit of Philippine Army from 1940s to 1950s. I was organized to combat communism and anti-dissidents campaigns in Luzon specifically against Huks. However, it was known as the second unit sent to Korea as part of Philippine Expeditionary Forces to Korea (PEFTOK) to replace the battered 10th Battalion Combat Team.

== Organization ==
After World War II the Philippine Army reorganized its units into battalion combat teams instead of larger organizations due to its limitation with personnel and budget. 20th Battalion was assigned within Luzon island and in 1951 it was selected to replace the first battalion in Korea. The battalion was moved to Camp Marikorea for training. Volunteers from other units replaced the men who will not go. By this time Colonel Salvador Abcede, a war veteran and guerilla leader against the Japanese during World War II. Under his leadership the battalion prepared for war.

== Korean War ==
Philippine Government sent Philippine Expeditionary Forces to Korea (PEFTOK) to help South Korea thwart Communist North Korea. Under the command of Lieutenant Colonel Salvador Abcede, 20th BCT was sent to replace 10th Battalion Combat Team. Advanced elements arrived on September 5, 1951, in Pusan, South Korea.

Upon arrival in Korea the battalion was sent to Chorwon area and took over 10th BCT missions. They were placed under the operational control of 3rd US Infantry Division from September 1951 to April 1952, then under 45th US Infantry Division from April 1952 to June 1952. On April 29, 1952, the Philippine Battalion was deployed along the main resistance line at Kalhwa-dong on the Jamestown line. In order to repel the enemy on the T-bone Ridge, the battalion engaged in 9 battles with CCF on the Hills of Eerie, Arsenal, and Hill 191 between 18 and 21 of May. Six out of the nine battles were hand-to-hand. In this series of combats, the battalion suffered only one wounded soldier while killing 70 of the enemy. The battalion returned home after this fighting.

=== Battle of Hill Eerie ===
It was in May 1952 that Lt. Ramos led a 44-man platoon of the 20th BCT to assault Eerie Hill. The Chinese occupied heavily fortified bunkers. The Chinese were armed with heavy weapons such as howitzers, bazookas, mortars, and .50 caliber machine guns. The presence of Chinese forces at Eerie Hill prevented United Nations Forces from advancing towards North Korea without suffering heavy casualties. Hence, the capture of Eerie Hill was vital.

Elements of the 20th BCT attempted nine times to capture Eerie Hill to no avail. Col. Salvador Abcede, commander of the 20th BCT, picked then 2Lt. Fidel V. Ramos a fresh graduate of US Military Academy to lead the assault on the strategic hill. The young lieutenant in coordination with his superiors and Allied Forces made an elaborate plan on how to attack Eerie Hill and capture it with any casualty as much as possible. Before they jumped off for the risky mission, Lt. Ramos, a devout Christian, led a prayer for God's protection. Jump off time was before daybreak of May 21, 1952. He divided his men into four groups. To avoid detection, they crawled for two hours through rice paddies. Four hundred meters from the top of Eerie Hill, they stopped for a while and surveyed the area.

Before launching the assault, seven F-86 Sabre jet fighter-bombers of the U.S. Air Force streaked the sky and dropped napalm bombs on the Chinese position. When the bombing stopped, Lt. Ramos called by radio the BCT headquarters and gave the order to open fire their artillery. The bombardment was very accurate. Then he radioed again to stop the artillery fire as he ordered his troops to commence the ground assault. Close quarter fighting erupted as the Chinese retreated. However, the Chinese continued firing as they retreated. But the Filipinos were undaunted and pursued the retreating enemy.

At this point, Lt. Ramos and his men seized the front part of the trench previously occupied by the Chinese. Sensing that they had gained the upper hand, the Filipinos were unstoppable as the fighting was at the crest of the hill. At the height of the close quarter battle, two Chinese soldiers got out from the bunker and tried to shoot Ramos, but the young lieutenant was quick to the draw and fired his Carbine rifle, fatally hitting the Chinese troopers.

The two sides engaged in hand-to-hand bayonet combat as the Filipinos prevailed and captured the once impregnable Eerie Hill.

== Return to the Philippines ==
The battalion ended its participation of Korean War within its return to the Philippines and replaced by 19th Battalion Combat Team. First contingent of the battalion return home in April 1952 and last contingent return in June 1952. The battalion incurred total of 490 casualties with 116 killed in action, 313 wounded in action, and 61 MIA or POWs. Lt. Benjamin Santos, Lt. Cesar Batilo, and Lt. Rodolfo Maestro were conferred with Gold Cross Medals. Maestro later was awarded with US Bronze Star with Valor by US Army. Lt. Leopoldo Regis received Distinguished Conduct Star and US Silver Star. 2Lt. Fidel Ramos was conferred with Military Merit Medal and last Captain Rodrigo Sarmiento was conferred with the same Military Merit medal meritorious service.

== Post Korean War and current ==
The battalion resumed its Anti-Communism and Anti-Dissidents campaign upon its return, it is now designated as 20th Infantry Battalion under 8th Infantry Division based in Catubig, Northern Samar.

== Notable members ==
- Fidel V. Ramos, Later became Chief of Philippine Constabulary, AFP Vice Chief of Staff, AFP Chief of Staff, Secretary of National Defense, and later President of the Republic of the Philippines.
- Jose Almonte, Later appointed as Director of National Intelligence Coordinating Agency under President Corazon Aquino and became Presidential Adviser on National Security Affairs by President Ramos.
- Salvador Abcede, a World War II veteran and guerilla leader during World War prior appointed as commander of the battalion.
- Fortunato Abat, Later became Commanding General Philippine Army, Ambassador, and Secretary of National Defense.

== See also ==
- Fidel V. Ramos
- Salvador Abcede
- Battle of Hill Eerie
- Philippine Expeditionary Forces to Korea (PEFTOK)
- 10th Battalion Combat Team
