= Jijangbong =

Mountain in South Korea

Highest point
- Elevation: 877.2 m (2,878 ft)

Geography
- Location: South Korea

Korean name
- Hangul: 지장봉
- Hanja: 地藏峰
- RR: Jijangbong
- MR: Chijangbong

Jijangbong (Korean: 지장봉) is a mountain in Gyeonggi Province, South Korea. Its area extends across Pocheon and Yeoncheon County. Jijangbong has an elevation of 877.2 m (2,878 ft).

== See also ==
- List of mountains in Korea
