= 75th Provisional Infantry Regiment =

Philippine military unit

75th (Provisional) Infantry Regiment (PA)
- Active: January 1942 - May 1942
- Disbanded: May 12, 1942
- Countries: Philippines
- Allegiance: United States Army
- Branch: Army
- Type: Reserve
- Role: Territorial Guard
- Size: 1,000
- Part of: Negros Force
- Garrison/HQ: Camp Leon Kilat, Dumaguete

Commanders
- Notable commanders: Major Pullong Arpa; Major Salvador Abcede; Major Tiburcio Ballesteros

Insignia
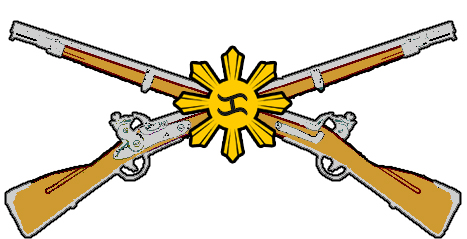
- Identification symbol

75th (Provisional) Infantry Regiment was a reserve unit of Philippine Commonwealth Army activated under Negros Force in January 1942. It saw no action as it was disbanded in May 1942 after it surrendered to Japanese during World War II. Most of its soldiers escaped and joined guerilla movement organized by Major Salvador Abcede.

== Background ==
71st Infantry Division was transferred from Negros to Luzon in September 1941 leaving only 73rd Infantry Regiment and 61st Infantry Regiment a unit transferred from Panay. Later both regiments was ordered to transfer to Mindanao island to bolster its defense leaving only PC units in Negros Island.

7th Military District under Lieutenant Colonel Gabriel Gador organized to regiments from reserve soldiers and ROTC cadets to bolster the island defense. 74th Infantry was organized in Negros Occidental and 75th Infantry Regiment in Negros Oriental with its headquarters in Dumaguete. It was initially commanded by Major Tiburcio Ballesteros. He brought along 3 Lieutenants to be part of his regimental staff 1Lieutenant Herminigildo Mercado who served as his Executive Officer,

2Lieutenant Maximino B. De Guzman who became S4, and 2Lieutenant Uldarico Baclagon who assumed S2 & S3 duties. The Provisional Battalion under 1Lieutenant Feliciano Señeres is now designated 1st Battalion and the ROTC Battalion under Silliman Commandant Captain Salvador Abcede and 1Lieutenant Antonio Romero now designated as 2nd Battalion became under Captain Salvador Abcede. 1Lieutenant Saturnino Abes arrived to assumed as Regimental S1 and 1Lieutenant Fidel Soliven Jr as S2 Intelligence.

The regiment moved to Guinhulgan, Negros Oriental in March 1942 to intensify its training and new set of officers arrived to fill the vacant staffs positions. A Japanese cruiser shell San Carlos but no Japanese landings happened, in April Japanese landed in Panay and Cebu dispersing respective force inland. On April 19, 1942, General Wainwright ordered General Sharp to assumed command of Visayas Force as General Bradford Chynoweth could no longer function due to no communication outside Cebu island. Sharp ordered all troops in the Mindanao and Visayas to surrender in May. A lot of commanders in Negros contest the order including those of 75th Infantry, having been isolated to the hostilities and soldiers not been in combat.

On May 12, 1942, 3,000 enlisted men and 700 officers surrendered in Negros but those who refused join Major Salvador Abcede's guerilla unit. The unit was disbanded and never reactivated after the war.

== Notable Soldiers ==
- Salvador Abcede - Became a Colonel in 1950 and commanded 20th Battalion Combat Team a Philippine contingent during Korean War.
