= Battle of Hill Eerie =

1952 engagement in the Korean War

- Part of the Korean War
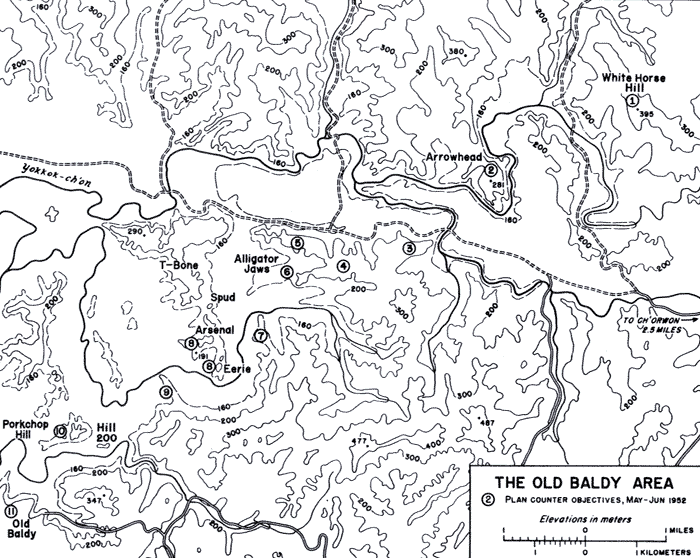
- Map of Eerie and the surrounding hill positions
Date	21 March – 18 July 1952
Location	Hill Eerie (near Chorwon, North Korea) 38°15′12″N 127°3′8″E
Result	United Nations victory

Belligerents
(United Nations) UN Command: Philippines; United States	China

Commanders and leaders
(United States) Mark W. Clark (History of the Philippines (1946–1965)) Fidel V. Ramos (History of the Philippines (1946–1965)) Felizardo Tanabe (History of the Philippines (1946–1965)) Salvador Abcede (History of the Philippines (1946–1965)) Ramon Z. Aquirre	Unknown

Units involved
(Philippines) 20th Battalion Combat Team (United States) 179th Infantry Regiment	Unknown

Casualties and losses
(Philippines) 25 killed (United States) 8 killed	UN estimate: 1,631 killed

The Battle of Hill Eerie (Tagalog: Labanan sa Burol ng Eerie; Korean: 이리고지 전투) refers to several Korean War engagements between the United Nations Command (UN) forces and the Chinese People's Volunteer Army (PVA) in 1952 at Hill Eerie, a military outpost about 10 miles (16 km) west of Ch'orwon. It was taken several times by both sides; each sabotaging the others' position.

== Background ==
T-Bone Hill was located north of the Jamestown Line in the west-central sector of the UN front. The southern tip of T-Bone which contained the outposts Eerie and Arsenal (38.257°N 127.046°E), lay approximately 2 miles (3.2 km) northeast of Pork Chop Hill. Arsenal was located about 600 yards (550 m) northwest of Eerie.

== Battle ==
=== March 1952 ===
In March 1952, Hill Eerie was the responsibility of the United States Army's 45th Infantry Division – Company K, 179th Infantry Regiment, commanded by Captain Max Clark.

On March 21, 1952, the twenty-six personnel of the third platoon, under the command of Lieutenant Omer Manley, set out to take over the outpost. Manley's men made up two rifle squads, a light-machine-gun squad and a 60-mm mortar squad. Manley sent out two patrols to establish an ambush site around the hill. That night, both patrol squads sighted enemy activity. At 23:30 the PVA attacked and a machine gun duel between the two sides ended after Captain Clark's troops on Hill 418 supported his men in the Eerie outpost with supporting machine-gun and mortar fire. The battle continued on the morning of 22 March with the PVA forces penetrating the outpost's perimeter and eventually overran Manley's men. Clark was then ordered to concentrate his artillery fire on Outpost Eerie after losing communications. At 01:30, Regimental Commander, Colonel Frederick A. Daugherty, ordered Clark to advance toward the hill and retake the hill.

Clark's men searched the area and found out that, of the 26 men who had defended the outpost, 8 were dead, 4 wounded, and 2 were missing (Lieutenant Manley and Corporal Joel Ybarra, later confirmed as POWs). They also recovered 31 PVA dead from around the hill and captured a wounded PVA soldier. Later, Clark withdrew his troops to the Jamestown Line.

=== May 1952 ===
In May 1952, the 20th Philippine Battalion Combat Team, under the command of Colonel Abcede, engaged the PVA forces at the town of Karhwagol, west of Chorwon; they were also involved in other major battles and assaults against the Chinese forces.

There were numerous closely fought battles on Hill Eerie, as well as on Hills 18, 200, and 19, ('Yoke', 'Uncle' and Old Baldy), all in the T-Bone Hill area, but later the 20th were committed to the Beef Steak Hill area and the Alligator Jaws (38.269°N 127.069°E).

A series of raids were launched by the Filipinos, from 18 May, led by Lieutenant Rodolfo Maestro, killing 28 PVA and a further 23 the next day, before disengaging with the PVA while tanks and artillery continued to bombard the outpost.

On 21 May 1952, Colonel Abcede ordered Major Felizardo Tanabe, the battalion's operations officer, to prepare the final assault on the PVA position after several attempts to capture the outpost. Tanabe sent the 44-man 2nd reconnaissance platoon to sabotage the position. The platoon was led by a young Filipino officer, a 1950 graduate of West Point's United States Military Academy, 2nd Lieutenant Fidel V. Ramos (future President of the Philippines). Ramos divided the assault team into four groups of snipers, riflemen, scouts and forward observers, each with a radio operator, a messenger and a medic. The platoon was reinforced by some engineer demolition specialists and an artillery observer team. They left at 04:07. The platoon crawled through rice paddies and scattered trees for two hours before it reach an irrigation ditch, about 400 meters from the top of the hill. Intelligence estimated the PVA strength to be one reinforced platoon. The United States Air Force sent seven F-86 Sabre jet fighters to pound the PVA positions with Napalm. There was also artillery support. After the bombardment, Ramos' men seized the front part of the trench network after discovering a hole in the blasted stack of barbed wire. Close-quarter fighting raged as the retreating PVA fought back but the advancing Filipinos were gaining the upper hand. The scout team, led by Corporal Juliano Palis, went into action on the right of the hill and was later joined by Lieutenant Ramos. Meanwhile, the rifle team, led by Sergeant Cipriano Drapeza, worked its way round to the left side of the hill while the sniper team, led by Second Lieutenant Yel Claveria, held the enemy's support from nearby Hill 191. By 07:28, the Filipinos had demolished the PVA bunkers and withdrawn from the top of the hill. UN tanks then resumed their bombardment of Hill Eerie. The assault had lasted for two hours, Ramos' men suffered one injury while the PVA had lost an estimated 1100 dead, 2540 wounded, whether from the supporting artillery, tanks and air strikes could not be determined. The battle was the final assault on Hill Eerie by the UN forces.

The Filipino battalion was replaced by the US 2nd Battalion, 179th Infantry.

=== June 1952 ===
On 16 June 1952, the 19th Philippine Battalion Combat Team, under the command of Colonel Ramon Z. Aguirre, relieved the US battalion in the T-Bone ridge sector. On 18 June the PVA forces sought to recapture the area and launched an intense artillery and mortar barrage. The Filipinos held their ground and were able to repulse the PVA attack. On 20 June the PVA launched another attack towards Hill Eerie and the rest of the T-Bone ridge area. At dawn, the PVA had advanced sufficiently to engage in hand-to-hand fighting but the Filipino troops were able to hold the position. By morning, the artillery battle continued but the UN forces successfully defended Hills Eerie and 191. As a result of the battle it was estimated that the PVA suffered 500 casualties while the Filipinos had 24.

The Filipino battalion was later relieved by the US 2nd Infantry Division on 18 July 1952.

== See also ==
- Korean War
- Battles of the Korean War
- Philippine Expeditionary Forces to Korea
