= 74th Provisional Infantry Regiment (PA) =

Philippine army unit

- Active: January 1942 - May 1942
- Disbanded: May 12, 1942
- Countries: United States of America; Philippines
- Allegiance: United States Army
- Branch: Army
- Type: Infantry
- Role: Reserve Troops
- Size: 1,500
- Part of: Negros Force
- Garrison/HQ: La Carlota, Negros Occidental

Commanders
- Notable commanders: Major Sam Jones, USA

Insignia
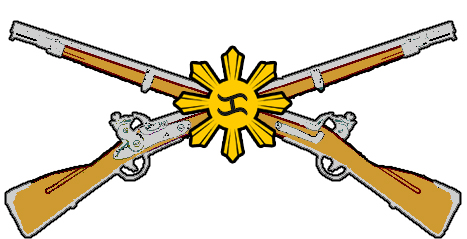
- Identification symbol

The 74th Infantry Regiment was a provisional unit activated and organized in Negros in the Philippines during World War II after all units of the 71st Infantry Division were transferred to Luzon and Mindanao. It was composed mostly of reserve ROTC cadets and recruits on Negros. It was activated by Headquarters, Philippine Army, in December 1941.

== History ==
The regiment was organized in Magallon, Negros Occidental (now Moises Padilla) to garrison Negros Occidental as the war progressed. Major Sam Jones was appointed its commander, with staff and officers coming from ROSS, commissions from ROTC, and SRC. He established his headquarters at Hacienda San Jos in La Castillana, Negros Occidental. The regiment was composed of a headquarters battalion, and three infantry battalions. Major Jose Culig was appointed as executive officer, and 1st Lieutenant Reyes as adjutant and S1. Majors Angel Okol, Francisco Gomez and Ernesto S. Mata were given command of the 1st, 2nd and 3rd Battalions, respectively.

After Mt. Canlaon was selected as the site for a defensive stand, preparations were started and engineering works begun to make Canlaon a "Little Bataan", named after the defense of the Bataan peninsula by combined Filipino and American forces. The 74th Infantry was assigned to defend the northern side of the volcano, on the Negros Occidental side, and the * 75th Infantry on the south, on the Negros Oriental side.

After the surrender of Luzon Force in Bataan and with Mindanao Force on verge of defeat, Negros was the only island not yet invaded by the Japanese. Lieutenant Colonel Jesse Traywick of USFIP Headquarters, who came from Mindanao, arrived in Negros to enforce an order of surrender by Major General Sharp and General Wainwright. On May 13, 1942, Colonel Hilsman surrendered all forces on Negros, but not all officers and men surrendered, instead establishing a guerilla unit under Majors Salvador Abcede and Ernesto S. Mata.

== See also ==
- Negros Force
