= Dionisio Ojeda =

Filipino military officer and politician (1911–1998)

- Ojeda's official portrait during the 8th Congress

Member of the Philippine House of Representatives for Veterans and the Elderly
- In office June 30, 1987 – June 30, 1992
- Preceded by: Position established
- Succeeded by: Position abolished

Personal details
- Born: October 11, 1911 Singalong, Manila, Philippine Islands
- Died: April 9, 1998 (aged 86)
- Spouse: Araceli del Rosario
- Children: 13
- Education: Philippine Constabulary Academy
- Awards: Legion of Merit (USA)

Military service
- Allegiance: Philippines
- Branch/service: Philippine Army
- Rank: Brigadier general
- Unit: 10th Battalion Combat Team; Philippine Expeditionary Forces to Korea
- Battles/wars: World War II; Battle of Bataan; Korean War; Battle of Yultong

Dionisio Santiago Ojeda (October 11, 1911 – April 9, 1998) was a Filipino military officer, war hero, and politician who served as the sectoral representative for veterans and the elderly in the Philippine House of Representatives from 1987 to 1992.

== Life and career ==
Dionisio Santiago Ojeda was born on October 11, 1911, in Singalong (now part of Malate), Manila. He graduated at the top of the 1936 class at the Philippine Constabulary Academy (now the Philippine Military Academy). He served as a colonel and later brigadier general, and commanded the 10th Battalion Combat Team of the Philippine Expeditionary Forces to Korea (PEFTOK) under the United Nations during the Korean War. He led the battalion to victory at the Battle of Yultong, where its 900 members, later known as "The Fighting Filipinos," defended their positions against the 40,000-member 12th Army of the Chinese People's Volunteers. During World War II, he participated in the Bataan Death March. While in military service, he received further training at local military staff schools and attended advanced courses at Fort Benning, Georgia, and Fort Leavenworth, Kansas.

In 1987, Ojeda was appointed by President Corazon Aquino to the House of Representatives as a sectoral member representing veterans and the elderly. During his tenure, he served as a member of the House committees on People's Power and Participation and Social Services, and the subcommittees on Disabled Persons' Welfare and General Legislation. He co-authored measures on free hospitalization and medical benefits for veterans, and on making retired police and military personnel beneficiaries of the Comprehensive Agrarian Reform Program, which was opposed by representatives Ronaldo Zamora and Ciriaco Alfelor. He was also part of the Philippine panel in the Philippine-United States military bases negotiations.

Ojeda was married to Araceli del Rosario, with whom he had 13 children. He died on April 9, 1998.

The BRP Dionisio Ojeda, a fast attack craft of the Philippine Navy, was named in his honor.

== Honors and decorations ==
- Legion of Merit

House of Representatives of the Philippines
| New title | Member of the Philippine House of Representatives for Veterans and the Elderly; 1987–1992 | Position abolished |
