= Battle of Yultong =

1951 Battle of the Korean War

Coordinates: 38°7′45″N 127°3′59″E

- Part of the Chinese Spring Offensive of the Korean War
Date	22–23 April 1951
Location	Yultong/Yuldong (presently part of Yeoncheon), South Korea
Result	United Nations victory

Belligerents
United Nations: Philippines; United States; Turkey	China

Commanders and leaders
Dionisio Ojeda; Conrado Yap †; Jose Artiaga, Jr. †	Zeng Shaoshan; You Taizhong

Units involved
10th Battalion Combat Team, PEFTOK	34th Division, 12th Army, PVA (UN account); 44th Division, 15th Army, PVA (Chinese account)

Strength
900	40,000 (Philippine account) 2 battalions 600–1,000 (132nd Regiment) (Chinese account)

Casualties and losses
12 killed 38 injured 6 missing	500+ killed 2 captured

The Battle of Yultong (Korean: 율동 전투; RR: Yultong Jeontu; Filipino: Labanan sa Yultong), also known as the Battle of Meiluodong (Chinese: 美罗洞战斗; pinyin: Měiluódòng Zhàndòu), Battle of Yuldong, Battle of Height 152 or Battle of Yuldong-ri, took place during the Korean War. It was fought between approximately 15,000 soldiers (in the Philippine account), or 2 battalions (600-1000) in the Chinese account, (Note: The paper strength of a PVA battalion was 852 soldiers, but in practice, the average strength of PVA units was significantly lower. A battalion typically has only about 500-600 soldiers.) from elements of the Chinese People's Volunteer Army (PVA) 34th Division (44th Division from Chinese sources) and 900 Filipino soldiers 10th Battalion Combat Team (BCT), north of Yeoncheon during April 22–23, 1951. The battle was part of the Chinese Spring Offensive.

== Background ==
The Philippine 10th BCT was attached to the U.S. 3rd Infantry Division at the time of the offensive. Initially composed of 9 troops, the battalion was reduced to 900 men due to previous casualties and other losses. To prepare for the incoming PVA offensive, the U.S. 65th Infantry Regiment deployed its 3rd and 2nd Battalions, facing west and northwest, respectively, along the Imjin River, while the attached Philippine 10th BCT held the regiment's right flank near Route 33. The Turkish Brigade, was just east of the Filipino unit.

Opposite the United Nations Command forces in the area were the PVA's III Army Group, composed of the 12th, 15th, and 60th Armies. The overall commander of the PVA forces, Peng Dehuai, planned to have the 12th and 15th Army attack and encircle the Turkish Brigade and the U.S. 3rd Infantry Division, respectively. Near the Imjin River, the 15th Army had a narrow zone between the river and Route 33 projecting through the area held by the 65th Regiment. Along Route 33 and east of it, the 12th Army and 60th Army were to attack through ground held by the Philippine 10th BCT on the right flank of the 3rd Division and through the Pogae-san ridges occupied by the Turkish Brigade and 24th Infantry Division.

== The battle ==
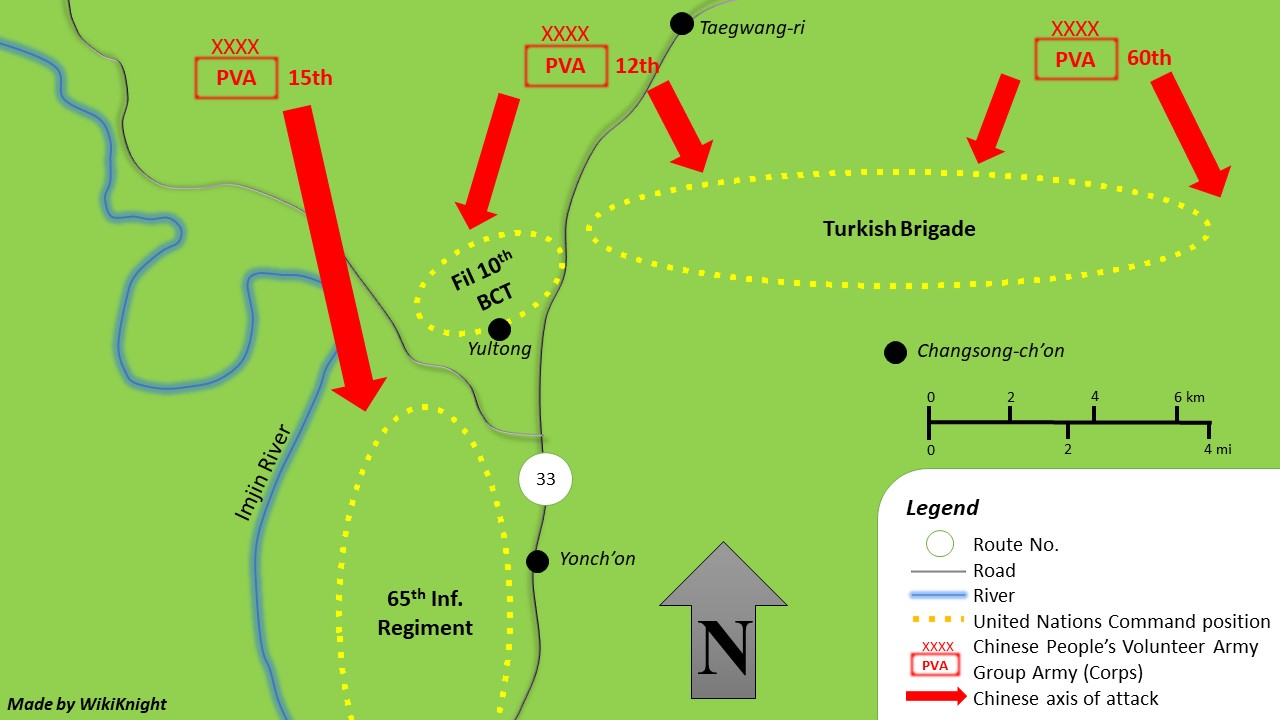
Unit positions near Yultong during the Chinese Spring Offensive.

The assault began at 20:00 on 22 April when the enemy hit the Turkish Brigade with an artillery barrage. Shortly after midnight, an artillery and mortar barrage followed by intense small-arms and machine gun fire struck the entire 3rd Division line. While the Turkish Brigade were engaged in fierce battle, the 10th BCT, deployed in the Yultong area on the left of the Turkish Brigade, from 23:00 was assaulted in waves by the PVA and fought a series of close combat engagements within its positions. Communication with the 65th Regiment was disconnected by enemy artillery and some friendly fire support but was restored at 00:30. Around midnight, the Turkish Brigade were ordered to withdraw to a position on the Line Kansas south of the Hantan River. The 65th Regiment's 2nd Battalion was forced to fall back several hundred yards to regroup due to the intensity of the PVA attack.

At 01:00 of 23 April, the 29th and 44th Divisions of the PVA 15th Army surrounded the 65th Regiment, cutting off its retreat. The battle forced the 10th BCT's drivers, typists, clerks, medics, cooks, and even the chaplain to join the active combatants. Each company was dispersed and fought in confusion without contact between the units. The battalion's Baker (B) Company, commanded by Lieutenant Jose Artiaga Jr., was defending the strategic Yultong Hill when PVA forces overran their position; the left platoon of B Company was pushed back from their position at 03:00 and, after four hours of furious combat, the PVA infiltrated as deeply as Charlie (C) Company position in the reserve area. The company suffered heavy casualties, including Artiaga. The battalion commander, Colonel Dionisio Ojeda, received orders to withdraw. All units complied, except the Tank (renamed into Heavy Weapons) Company. Tank Company commander Captain Conrado Yap led a counterattack towards the hill to rescue any survivors and recover the dead men of B Company. Although Yap lost his life in the counterattack, the Tank Company succeeded in their objective and recovered a squad of survivors.

The 10th BCT held their positions until early morning and covered the retreat of the U.S. 3rd Division. At first light, the PVA offensive gradually declined, and the battalion launched a counterattack to restore the lost area of B Company, which succeeded in recovering some of the ground lost to the initial assault. C Company supported by two M24 Chaffee light tanks of Recon Company and an allied artillery unit led the counterattack. At 09:00 on 23 April, General James Van Fleet, commander of the U.S. Eighth Army, ordered a withdrawal to Line Kansas after concluding that many units in I and IX Corps were in danger of being enveloped by the PVA forces. At 12:15, the 10th BCT finally received orders from General Robert Soule to fall back to Line Kansas, withdrawing to a position in Anhung-ri.

== Aftermath ==
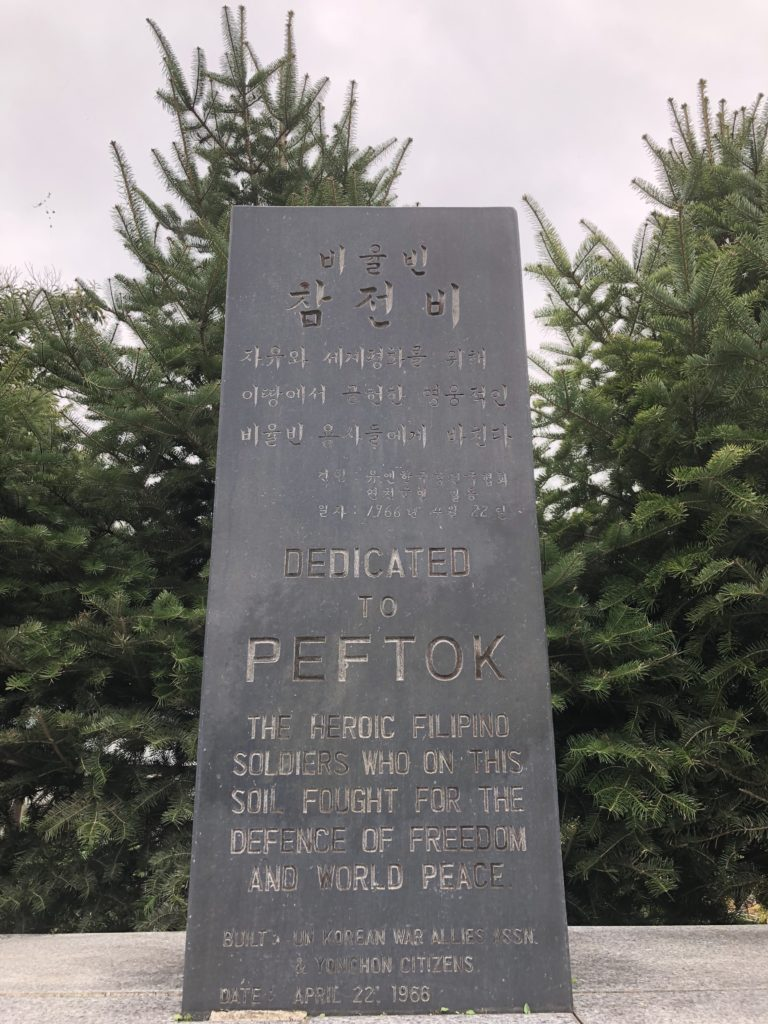
Dedication to PEFTOK

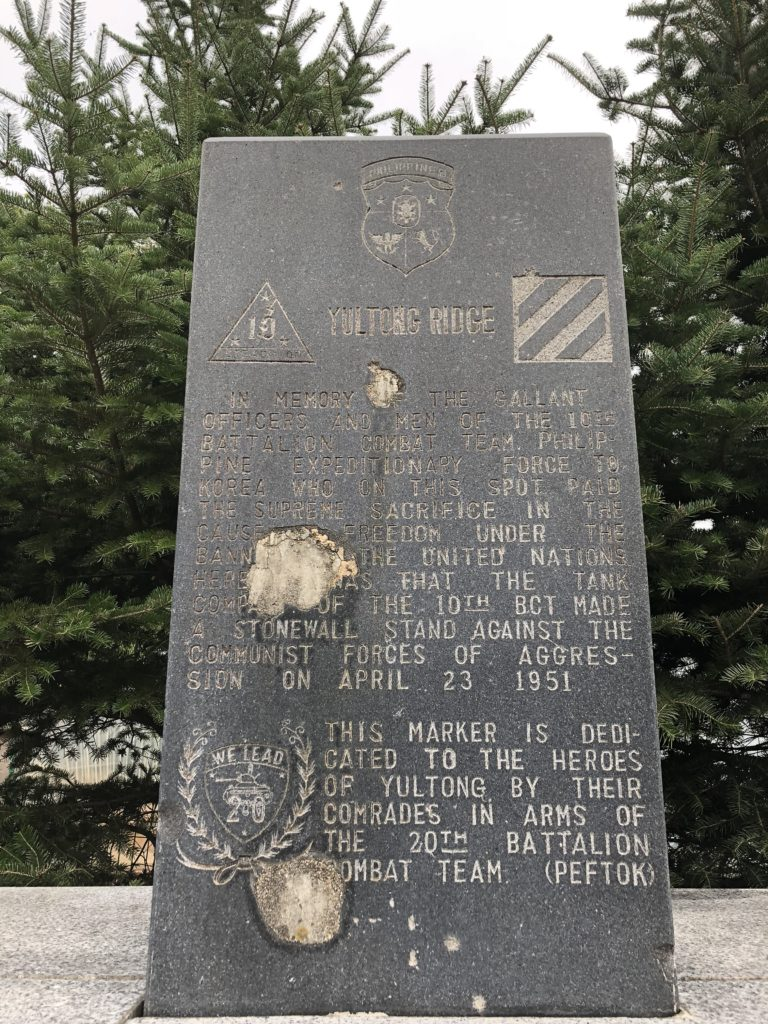
Monument to Yultong Ridge Battle

For their actions, Yap was posthumously awarded the Philippine Medal of Valor and the U.S. Distinguished Service Cross, while Artiaga was posthumously awarded the Philippine Distinguished Conduct Star. On July 27, 2018, Yap was awarded the First Class Taegeuk Cordon of the Order of Military Merit on the 65th anniversary of the Korean Armistice Agreement.

The 10th Battalion Combat Team reported around 12 killed, 38 wounded, and 6 missing in action, however a tourism office in Yeoncheon discussing the monument to the battle claims 125 killed in the battle. PVA losses were reported to be more than 500 killed and 2 captured.

Despite losing many troops against the 65th Infantry Regiment, the PVA succeeded in establishing a regiment-size bridgehead south of the Imjin on the morning of 23 April 1951, leading to orders for a withdrawal to the Kansas Line, on 24 April 1951, the 10th BCT was attached to the British 29th Brigade Group as a reserve force and would later participate in the attempted rescue of the Gloucestershire Regiment during the Battle of the Imjin River.

On 22 April 1966, the 15th anniversary of the Chinese Spring Offensive, a monument was erected to commemorate the battle in Yeoncheon, South Korea.

== Bibliography ==
- Chae, Han Kook; Chung, Suk Kyun; Yang, Yong Cho (2001), Yang, Hee Wan; Lim, Won Hyok; Sims, Thomas Lee; Sims, Laura Marie; Kim, Chong Gu; Millett, Allan R. (eds.), The Korean War, vol. II, Lincoln, NE: University of Nebraska Press, ISBN 978-0-8032-7795-3
- Chinese Military Science Academy (2000), History of War to Resist America and Aid Korea (抗美援朝战争史) (in Chinese), vol. II, Beijing: Chinese Military Science Academy Publishing House, ISBN 7-80137-390-1
- Guillermo, Artemio R. (2012), Historical Dictionary of the Philippines, Lanham, MD: Scarecrow Press, ISBN 9780810872462
- Hu, Guang Zheng (胡光正); Ma, Shan Ying (马善营) (1987), Chinese People's Volunteer Army Order of Battle (中国人民志愿军序列) (in Chinese), Beijing: Chinese People's Liberation Army Publishing House, OCLC 298945765
- Institute for Military History (2011), History of the Korean War (6·25전쟁사) (in Korean), vol. VIII, Seoul: Korea Armed Forces Publishing & Printing Depot, ISSN 1739-2705
- Li, Xiaobing (2014), China's Battle for Korea: The 1951 Spring Offensive, Bloomington, IN: Indiana University Press, ISBN 9780253011633
- Li, Xiaobing (2019), China's War in Korea: Strategic Culture and Geopolitics, Singapore: Springer Nature, ISBN 9789813296756
- Mossman, Billy C. (2000), Ebb and Flow, November 1950-July 1951, Washington D.C.: Center of Military History, United States Army, ISBN 9781944961350
- Pobre, Cesar P. (2012), Filipinos in the Korean War, Quezon City, Philippines: Department of National Defense, Philippine Veterans Affairs Office, ISBN 9789719541813
- Pobre, Cesar P. (2000), History of the Armed Forces of the Filipino People, Quezon City, Philippines: New Day Publishers, ISBN 9789711010416
- Rottman, Gordon L. (2002), Korean War Order of Battle: United States, United Nations, and Communist Ground, Naval, and Air Forces, 1950-1953, Westport, CT: Greenwood Publishing Group, ISBN 9780275978358
- Thomas, Nigel; Abbott, Peter; Chappell, Mike (1986), The Korean War, 1950-53, Oxford, United Kingdom: Osprey Publishing, ISBN 9780850456851
- Villahermosa, Gilberto N. (2009), Honor and Fidelity: The 65th Infantry in Korea, 1950-1953, Washington, D.C.: United States Army Center of Military History, ISBN 9780160833243, archived from the original on 8 November 2010
- Villasanta, Juan F. (1954), Dateline Korea: Stories of the Philippine Battalion, Negros Occidental, Philippines: Nalco Press, OCLC 612957546
- War History Compilation Committee (1977), The History of the United Nations Forces in the Korean War, vol. 6, Seoul: Republic of Korea Ministry of National Defense, OCLC 769331231
