= BRP Conrado Yap (PS-30) =

Philippine Navy corvette

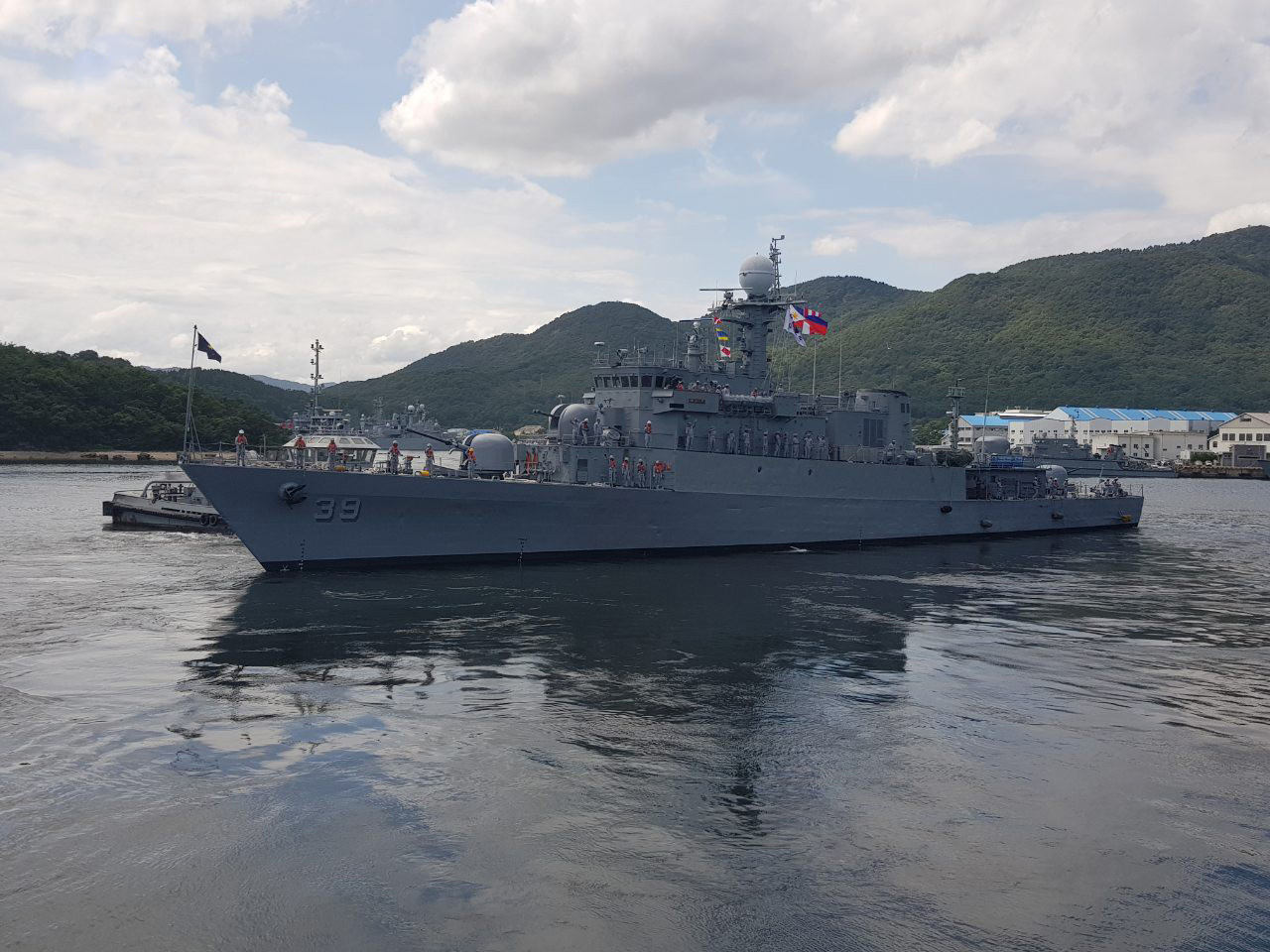
- BRP Conrado Yap (PS-39)

History

South Korea
- Name: ROKS Chungju
- Builder: Korea Tacoma Shipyard
- Launched: 24 January 1986
- Commissioned: 30 November 1986
- Decommissioned: 27 December 2016
- Identification: PCC-762
- Fate: Transferred to Philippine Navy

Philippines
- Name: BRP Conrado Yap
- Namesake: Capt. Conrado D. Yap
- Acquired: 5 August 2019
- Commissioned: 5 August 2019
- Motto: Steady on
- Status: in active service
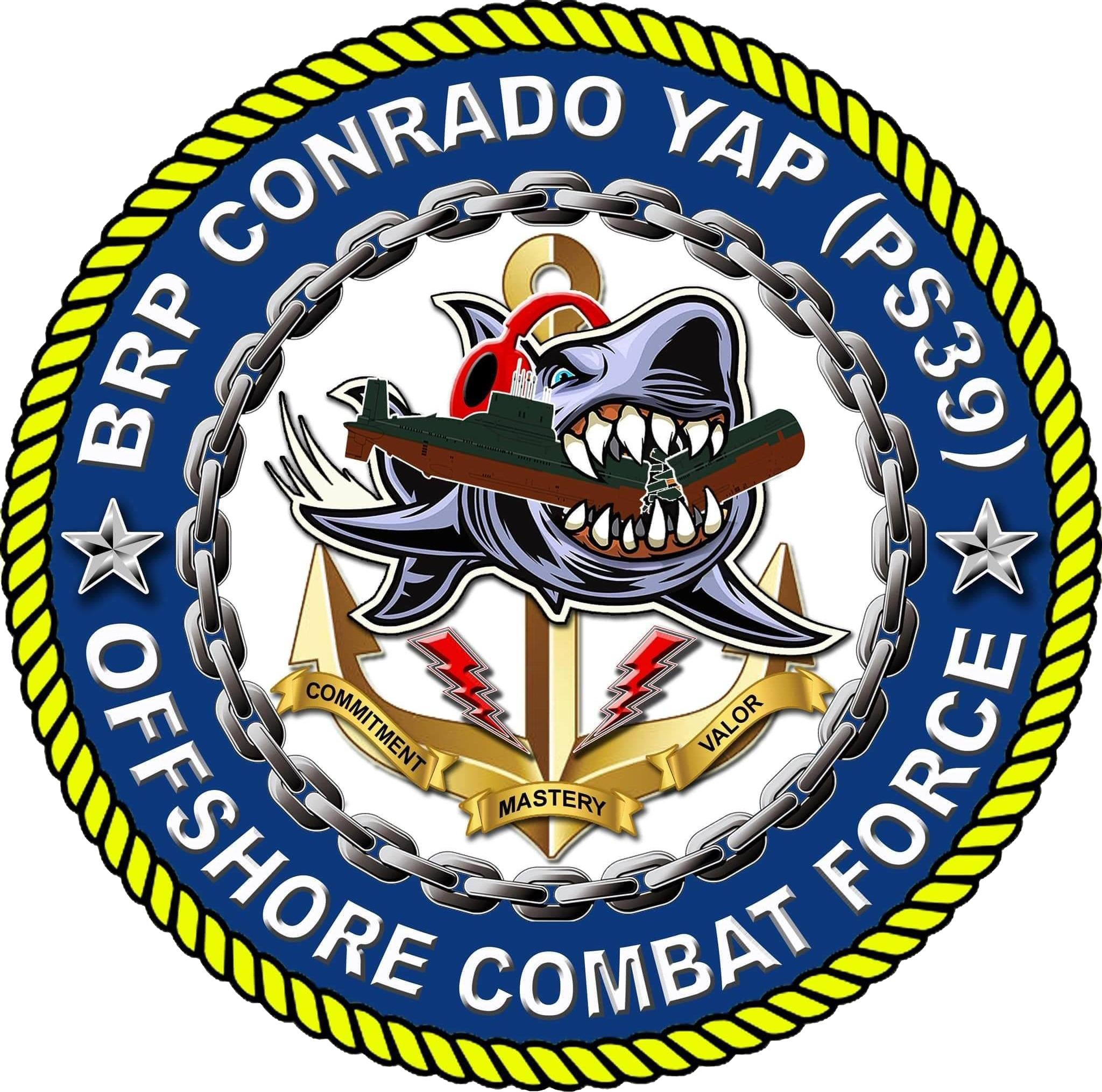
- Badge

General characteristics
- Class & type: Pohang-class corvette
- Displacement: 1,220 tons
- Length: 88.3 m (289 ft 8 in)
- Beam: 10 m (32 ft 10 in)
- Draft: 2.9 m (9 ft 6 in)
- Installed power: 2 × MTU 6V396 TC52 diesel generators
- Propulsion: Combined diesel or gas (CODOG) arrangement: 2 × MTU 12V956 TB82 diesel engines producing combined total of 6,260 shp (4,670 kW); 1 × General Electric LM2500 PB gas turbines generating 27,820 shp (20,700 kW)
- Speed: 32 knots (59 km/h) maximum
- Range: 4,000 nautical miles (7,400 km) at 15 knots (28 km/h) using diesel engines
- Endurance: 20 Days
- Boats & landing craft carried: 2 × RHIB
- Crew: 118
- Sensors & processing systems: X-band & S-band navigational radars; Raytheon AN/SPS-64(V)5B surface search radar; Signaal (Thales Nederland) WM-28 Fire Control System; Signaal (Thales Nederland) LIOD optronic director; Raytheon AN/SQS-58 hull mounted passive/active sonar
- Electronic warfare & decoys: 2 × Loral Hycor Mk 34 RBOC chaff and decoy launching system
- Armament: 2 × Oto Melara 76 mm/62-caliber Compact naval guns; 2 × Otobreda 40 mm L/70 twin naval guns; 2 × Mk 32 triple torpedo tubes; 2 × Mk 9 depth charge racks; 6 × M2HB Browning .50-caliber machine guns

BRP Conrado Yap (PS-30) (previously PS-39) is a Pohang-class corvette currently commissioned with the Philippine Navy. She is the service' first modern corvette and one of its most heavily armed units. She was originally named ROKS Chungju (PCC-762) during her service with the Republic of Korea Navy.

== Design ==
The ship has a length of 88.3 meters (289 ft 8 in), a beam of 10 meters (32 ft 10 in) and draft of 2.9 meters (9 ft 6 in). The ship has a displacement of 1,220 tons full load. It has a rated capacity for a crew consisting of 118 personnel and can operate non-stop for 20 days. The ship has a maximum speed of 30 knots (56 km/h; 35 mph) and has a range of to 4,000 nautical miles (7,400 km; 4,600 mi). It is powered by a combined diesel or gas, and LM2500 gas turbines.

The ship was designed for coastal defense and anti-submarine operations. She is being utilized by the Philippine Navy for anti-submarine warfare (ASW) training in preparation for transition to the new frigates being built in South Korea for the Philippine Navy. The Department of National Defense is trying to request for transfer of more units.

== Armament ==
The ship's armament consists of:

- two Oto Melara 76 mm/62-caliber Compact naval guns,
- two Otobreda 40 mm L/70 twin naval guns,
- two Mk. 32 triple torpedo tubes,
- two Mk 9 depth charge racks, and
- six M2HB Browning .50-caliber machine guns.

The vessel is also equipped with a mount for a Man-portable air-defense system that can accommodate either:

- MBDA Mistral SIMBAD-RC, or
- LIGNex1 Chiron VSHORAD missile system.

== Service history ==
In 1987, she was commissioned into the Republic of Korea Navy as the ROKS Chungju (PCC-762). She was decommissioned in December 2016, after decades of service.

On 5 August 2019, she was officially transferred to the Philippine Navy and was commissioned into service the same day at the Jinhae Naval Base. She was renamed BRP Conrado Yap (PS-39), after Philippine Army Captain Conrado Yap who fought in the Korean War.

The ship is optimized for ASW missions. She will be used to build ASW capabilities of the Philippine Navy, along with the newly acquired ASW helicopters. Prior to these, the Philippines lacked any ASW capability in a region where the number of submarines being operated by neighboring countries was reportedly set to grow.

On 17 February 2020, BRP Conrado Yap encountered the People's Liberation Army Navy Type 056A corvette Liupanshui on its patrol mission. The crew of Conrado Yap visually observed Liupanshui's gun control director pointing at them.

On 26 November 2022, Conrado Yap conducted a Goodwill Exercise with JS Harusame in the vicinity of Subic.

As of 2024, Conrado Yap's hull number was changed to PS-30 according to its official Facebook page.

== See also ==
- List of ships of the Philippine Navy
