= Salvador Abcede =

Leader of the anti-Japanese guerilla group

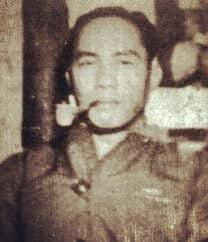
- Born: September 6, 1913; Indan (now Vinzons), Camarines Norte, Insular Philippines
- Died: August 19, 1982 (aged 68); Veterans Memorial Hospital, Quezon City, Metro Manila
- Burial place: Libingan Ng Mga Bayani, Makati, Metro Manila
- Education: Philippine Constabulary Academy (Now PMA)
- Spouse: Choleng Saman-Abcede
- Military career
- Allegiance: Philippines; United States
- Branch: Philippine Army
- Service years: 1941–1955
- Rank: Colonel
- Nickname: Badong
- Units: 20th Battalion Combat Team, PA Negros Force 2nd Battalion, 75th Infantry
- Commands: Manila Police Department AFP Command and General Staff College; 20th Battalion Combat Team; Negros Oriental Guerilla Unit 2nd Battalion, 75th Provisional Infantry
- Known for: Chief of Police, Manila Police Department Commander, 20th Battalion Combat Team, Korean War Guerilla Leader during World War II
- Conflicts: Battle of Hill Erie, Korea; Guerilla Campaigns in Negros
- Other work: Chief of Police, Manila City

Col. Salvador Abcede (September 6, 1913 – August 19, 1982), a Philippine Army officer and was the leader of the anti-Japanese guerrilla group on Negros. during the Japanese occupation and commander of 20th Battalion Combat Team who fought in the Korean War.

== Early life and education ==
Abcede was born on September 6, 1913 in Indan (now Vinzons), Camarines Norte, to parents Felimon Abcede and Dorotea Sureta. He took his early education in Indan Elementary School and Indan High School. In 1935 he took attended Philippine Constabulary Academy and graduated in 1937 just as the Academy transitioned to a Military Academy. He was commissioned as 3rd Lieutenant with the Philippine Army and was sent to 7th Military District in Negros Island.

== World War II ==
In 1940 he was appointed as ROTC Commandant of Silliman University in Dumaguete, Negros Oriental. When all reservist were called for duty he found himself appointed every possible positions in the military units in Negros. From staffs positions to field command in 7th Military District. When Lieutenant Colonel Gabriel Gador was ordered to Mindanao and Colonel Roger Hilsman assumed command of the island he was again moved to command staffs. He was involved in recruiting, training, planning of the defense of the island. But in February 1942 he was appointed as commander of 2nd Battalion, 74th Infantry based in Tanjay, Negros Occidental.

=== Guerilla activities ===
An order from General Sharp who assumed command of Visayas-Mindanao Force again after General Chynoweth was cut off in Cebu to surrender. He was one of the officers who refused to follow the order as they question the order of General Wainwright who is a captive already. He took his unit into the mountains of Negros and setup a guerilla activity. He operated in the mountains of Tanjay, Negros Oriental and later moved to the mountains of Dumaguete by the invitation of Silliman University ROTC group who also joined the soldiers under the USAFFE 71st Division during the Japanese Invasion and led guerrilla moves against the Japanese. He was appointed by Lieutenant Colonel Jesus Villamor an agent of General MacAthur as commander of entire Negros Island in 1943 until end of the war in 1945. He help the liberation of the island when American forces landed in Negros in 1945.

== Post War ==
Abcede rejoined the Philippine Army upon the resumption of Philippine Commonwealth in 1945. He was sent the United States to attend US Army Command and General Staff College in Fort Leavenworth, Kansas. He took command of the 20th Battalion Combat Team and engaged in Anti-Communism campaign against HUKBALAHAP rebels.

=== Korean War ===
His 20th Battalion Combat Team was selected to joined the troops of the Philippine Expeditionary Forces to Korea (PEFTOK) and engaged in Iron Triangle area which led to his battalion involved in the Battle of Hill Eerie in 1952. He selected then Lieutenant Fidel V. Ramos, to led the assault of the hill and they were honored as heroes as well as other Filipino officers and all troops with aiding American forces of the 45th Infantry Division units in fighting against the Chinese Communist forces under the People's Volunteer Army during the Korean War. He returned to the Philippines together with his battalion in June 1952. He was promoted to full Colonel and later appointed as Commandant of Armed Forces of the Philippines Command and General Staff College.

== Retirement and other work ==
Upon retirement he was appointed as Chief of Police of City of Manila in 1957 to 1959. He died in 1982 due to Cirrhosis of the Liver at Veterans Memorial Hospital in Quezon City and buried at Libingan Ng Mga Bayani in Taguig. Philippine Navy patrol ship BRP Salvador Abcede (PG 114) was named in his honor.

== Awards and decorations ==
- Distinguished Service Cross
- Legion of Merit
- Philippine Independence Medal
- Philippine Liberation Medal
- Philippine Defense Medal
- Resistance Movement Medal (Philippines)

== See also ==
- BRP Salvador Abcede (PC-114)
- List of American guerrillas in the Philippines
