= Yeoncheon County =

Yeoncheon
- County
- View of Yeoncheon-eup

- Flag Emblem of Yeoncheon

- Location in Gyeonggi Province

- Location within South Korea Location within Korea
- Coordinates: 38°06′N 127°05′E
- Country: South Korea
- Region: Sudogwon
- Administrative divisions: 2 eup, 8 myeon

Area
  - Total: 675.22 km^{2} (260.70 sq mi)

Population (September 2024)
  - Total: 40,894
  - Density: 60.564/km^{2} (156.86/sq mi)
  - Dialect: Seoul

Korean name
- Hangul: 연천군
- Hanja: 漣川郡
- RR: Yeoncheon-gun
- MR: Yŏnch'ŏn-gun

Yeoncheon County (Korean: 연천군) is a county in Gyeonggi Province, South Korea. The county seat is Yeoncheon-eup (연천읍) and sits on Gyeongwon Line, the Korail railroad line connecting Seoul, South Korea (ROK), with North Korea (DPRK).

== History ==
Map of Yeoncheon County (1899)

A variety of Paleolithic relics have been discovered at Jeongok-ri, first in 1978. Since 1993 the Yeoncheon Jeongok-ri Paleolithic Festival has celebrated the discovery.

Yeoncheon was the site of the Battle of Yultong during the Korean War, where the Philippine 10th Battalion Combat Team defended their position during the First Chinese Spring Offensive.

In August 1980, shortly after the 1980 coup, the military regime of Chun Doo-hwan established a concentration camp for "purificatory education" in Yeoncheon.

In August 2015, over 100 civilians were evacuated from the area after North and South Korea exchanged artillery fire.

== Administrative districts ==
The city is divided into two eup (towns) and eight myeon (townships):

Town/Township	Hanja	Population	Households
Yeoncheon-eup	漣川邑	6,707	3,100
Jeongok-eup	全谷邑	20,872	8,522
Gunnam-myeon	郡南面	3,549	1,704
Cheongsan-myeon	靑山面	4,606	2,333
Baekhak-myeon	百鶴面	2,857	1,263
Misan-myeon	嵋山面	1,755	845
Wangjing-myeon	旺澄面	1,155	579
Sinseo-myeon	新西面	3,268	1,707
Jung-myeon	中面	261	145
Jangnam-myeon	長南面	678	307

== Climate ==
Yeoncheon has a monsoon-influenced humid continental climate (Köppen: Dwa) with cold, dry winters and hot, rainy summers.

Climate data for Yeoncheon (1999–2020 normals)
Month	Jan	Feb	Mar	Apr	May	Jun	Jul	Aug	Sep	Oct	Nov	Dec	Year
Mean daily maximum °C (°F)	1.8 (35.2)	5.1 (41.2)	11.5 (52.7)	18.7 (65.7)	24.6 (76.3)	28.5 (83.3)	29.8 (85.6)	30.8 (87.4)	26.6 (79.9)	20.4 (68.7)	11.6 (52.9)	3.2 (37.8)	17.7 (63.9)
Daily mean °C (°F)	−4.7 (23.5)	−1.3 (29.7)	4.8 (40.6)	11.5 (52.7)	17.6 (63.7)	22.3 (72.1)	25.0 (77.0)	25.5 (77.9)	20.3 (68.5)	12.9 (55.2)	5.3 (41.5)	−2.6 (27.3)	11.4 (52.5)
Mean daily minimum °C (°F)	−10.5 (13.1)	−7.2 (19.0)	−1.6 (29.1)	4.6 (40.3)	11.2 (52.2)	17.0 (62.6)	21.3 (70.3)	21.5 (70.7)	15.2 (59.4)	6.9 (44.4)	−0.2 (31.6)	−7.8 (18.0)	5.9 (42.6)
Average precipitation mm (inches)	15.4 (0.61)	22.7 (0.89)	29.1 (1.15)	61.5 (2.42)	84.2 (3.31)	112.1 (4.41)	379.7 (14.95)	346.6 (13.65)	133.5 (5.26)	52.9 (2.08)	44.0 (1.73)	14.1 (0.56)	1,295.8 (51.02)
Average precipitation days (≥ 0.1 mm)	3.1	3.9	5.7	7.4	7.0	8.8	14.5	12.9	7.1	5.5	6.9	5.0	87.8
Source: Korea Meteorological Administration

== Sister cities ==
- Zoucheng, Shandong, China
- Shibata, Niigata, Japan
- Imus, Cavite, Philippines
- Palmdale, California, United States of America

== See also ==
- Paju
