= Conrado Yap =

Philippine army officer (1921 – 1951)

- Born: Conrado Dumlao Yap; 22 January 1921; Candelaria, Zambales, Commonwealth of the Philippines
- Died: April 23, 1951 (aged 30); Yeoncheon County, First Republic of Korea
- Cause of death: Killed in Action
- Education: Philippine Military Academy Class 1943
- Military career
- Allegiance: Philippines
- Branch: Philippine Army
- Service years: 1941–1951
- Rank: Captain
- Service number: O-1914
- Units: 10th Battalion Combat Team; Philippine Expeditionary Forces to Korea - Heavy Weapons Company
- Commands: Heavy Weapons Company, 10th Battalion Combat Team (Philippines)
- Conflicts: Korean War; Battle of Yultong †
- Awards: Philippine Medal of Valor; Distinguished Service Cross (USA); Taegeuk (First Class) Order of Military Merit (South Korea)

Conrado Dumlao Yap (January 22, 1921 – April 23, 1951) was an officer in the Philippine Army who served during the Second World War and the Korean War.

He was a recipient of the Philippines' highest military award, the Medal of Valor, which he was posthumously awarded for his actions of valor and courage in the Battle of Yultong. Yap was one of the 1,367 Filipino troops composing the 10th Battalion Combat Team of the Philippine Expeditionary Forces to Korea (PEFTOK), first of the five Philippine Army Battalion Combat Team's contingent of United Nations Command forces that fought in the Korean War (1950–1953).

He was killed in action in the early morning hours of 23 April 1951 in the Battle of Yultong during a successful counterattack against Chinese forces that overran his hilltop position in territory which currently belongs to South Korea. Yap was posthumously the most decorated Filipino serviceman of the Korean War, receiving medals from the US, South Korea and the Philippines.

== Early life and education ==
Yap was born on January 22, 1921, in Candelaria, Zambales. He was a graduate of the Philippine Military Academy class of 1943.

In 1949, he graduated of the U.S. Army Armor School, then at Fort Knox, KY. Then became Captain of the 10th BCT - Tank Company, an Army heavy tank company in 1950. When the 10th BCT arrived in Busan, Korea, they didn't take their tanks with them as the US was going to supply them with armor when they arrived. Their waiting tanks (17 M4 Shermans and one M10 tank destroyer) were destroyed when the communist North Korean army pushed back the UN forces further down south of the Korean peninsula. The only tanks available were seven M24 Chaffee light tanks which was designated to the 10th BCT - Recon Company. Capt Yap, Tank Company was resignated as Heavy Weapons Company which was equipped with heavy to light automatic machine guns.

== Battle of Yultong ==
After the Chinese entered the Korean War in November 1950, they launched a major offensive the following year that saw Yap's unit, the 10th Battalion Combat Team (10th BCT) opposite four Chinese divisions numbering about 40,000 men. Close to midnight of 23 April 1951, the Communist Chinese forces attacked a Puerto Rican regiment positioned on the 10th BCT's western flank. As the Puerto Ricans fell back to re-consolidate their lines, the Chinese began to advance up the exposed Filipino unit's flank.

A platoon of soldiers from the 10th BCT Tank Company fighting as infantry - Heavy Weapons Company under the command of Lt. Jose Artiaga positioned themselves on a hill on the 10th BCT's flank overlooking the Korean village of Yultong in Yeoncheon County. The Chinese attacked them with superior numbers but Artiaga's unit made a stand. This bought time for his company commander, Captain Yap to launch a counterattack to rescue Artiaga and his platoon from the Chinese. Both Artiaga and Yap were killed in action. However, that action saved the platoon from total annihilation and stopped the Chinese advance from reaching the exposed flank of the 10th BCT.

Lt. Jose Artiaga was conferred the United States Distinguished Service Cross as a consequence of his actions at the Battle of Yultong.

== Military awards ==
Yap was conferred the Philippine Medal of Valor by Elpidio Quirino and the United States Distinguished Service Cross for his actions at the Battle of Yultong.

=== Medal of Valor citation ===
"By direction of the President, pursuant to paragraph 2a, Section I, AFPR 600–45, this Headquarters, dated 16 December 1948, the Medal for Valor is hereby posthumously awarded by the Chief of Staff, Armed Forces of the Philippines, to the following-named officer:

CAPT CONRADO D YAP PA O-1914 Coast Artillery Corps AFP

For conspicuous gallantry and intrepidity at the risk of his life against overwhelming enemy forces at Yultong, North Korea on 22–23 April 1951. As Commanding Officer of the Tank Company, Tenth Battalion Combat Team, Philippine Expeditionary Force to Korea, CAPT YAP at 2300 hours on 22 Apr 1951, was executing a defensive action as an advance element of the frontline defense of the United States Army when an overwhelming superior enemy forces assaulted the PEFTOK positions as a part of the enemy's general offensive. Upon being informed by his most advance unit that the enemy were rushing in to overrun their hill position and that the leader of this unit FIRST LIEUTENANT JOSE M ARTIAGA JR O-1966 INFANTRY, was hit, Captain Yap, determined to hold their position at all costs, reinforced the trapped unit of Lieutenant Artiaga and fought the enemy for one hour without success. Receiving a personal report from a member of the trapped unit who succeeded in extricating himself that the enemy has already captured the position and that Lieutenant Artiaga and many others were killed, captured or wounded, Captain Yap, in a desperate effort to rescue the lost unit ordered for covering support from the other units under his command and personally led a furious counterattack to regain the hill position and rescue the trapped unit despite an authority that he may withdraw which he has already received. He succeeded in recovering the body of Lieutenant Artiaga and that of three (3) other enlisted men when not being satisfied with this and acting above and beyond the call of duty, he proceeded to assault an enemy emplacement about 300 yards away despite the hail of enemy fires until he fell dead from an enemy bullet. His extraordinary heroism, indomitable courage, calmness and decisiveness won for him and the entire Tenth Battalion Combat Team praises by other allied nations’ soldiers with whom they are fighting side by side in Korea, and will inevitably form a part of the glorious traditions of our Armed Forces."

=== Distinguished Service Cross citation ===
"The President of the United States of America, under the provisions of the Act of Congress approved July 9, 1918, takes pride in presenting the Distinguished Service Cross (Posthumously) to Captain Conrado D. Yap, Army of the Philippines, for extraordinary heroism in connection with military operations against an armed enemy of the United Nations while serving with the Tenth Battalion Combat Team, Philippine Expeditionary force to Korea, in action against enemy forces at Yultong, Korea on 22 and 23 April 1951. Shortly before midnight on 22 April 1951, his company, occupying defensive positions, came under a vicious hostile attack which seriously penetrated the perimeter. Exploiting the breach, the enemy launched successive, determined assaults throughout the night. Constantly exposed to machine-gun, mortar, and artillery fire, Captain Yap crawled from foxhole to foxhole, steadying his men and encouraging them to hold firm. Learning that his First Platoon had been overrun, and despite orders from his battalion commander to withdraw his unit, he fearlessly led a daring charge in a determined effort to reach the beleaguered platoon. Overwhelming enemy strength and heavy fire received from flanks and to the front notwithstanding, they relentlessly pressed the assault, regained the hill, evacuated the casualties, and rescued the isolated unit. Observing a stricken soldier on the slope of the hill, Captain Yap immediately started toward the man but was mortally wounded by a burst of enemy fire. Inspired by his heroic conduct, his men continued the fight with such determination and skill that the enemy attack was contained and numerous casualties were inflicted. Captain Yap's display of courage, devotion to duty, and inspiring leadership reflect the highest credit on himself and the Army of the Republic of the Philippines."

== Commemoration ==
Conrado Yap is commemorated in various ways in the Philippine military. These include:

- Conrado Yap-class patrol craft, a series of ex-South Korean Haksaeng-class patrol boats sold to the Philippine Navy in 1993.
- Camp Conrado Yap, a Philippine National Police facility in Iba, Zambales.
- Yap Hall, the Philippine Military Academy's mess hall, is named in his honor.
- BRP Conrado Yap (PS-39), the Philippine Navy's 1st modern corvette & its most heavily armed unit
- Captain Conrado D. Yap Street, Candelaria, Zambales
- Captain Conrado D. Yap Day - a non-working holiday in Candelaria, Zambales, every 23rd day of April.
- Conrado D. Yap Library and Museum In Candelaria, Zambales.
- Conrado D. Yap Hall - Mechanized Infantry Division Headquarters in Camp O’Donnell, Capas, Tarlac.
