= Philippine Expeditionary Forces to Korea =

Philippine contingent of the UN forces during the Korean War

Philippine Expeditionary Force to Korea
- Ipinadalang Lakas ng Pilipinas sa Korea
- PEFTOK Veterans' Association logo, incorporating the insignia of the different Filipino units that fought in Korea
- Active: 1950–1955
- Disbanded: 1955
- Country: Philippines; South Korea
- Allegiance: United Nations; Third Philippine Republic; First Republic of Korea
- Branch: Philippine Army
- Type: 5 Battalion combat team (BCT) incorporating Infantry, Artillery and Reconnaissance elements
- Size: c.7,500 over duration of the war
- Nickname: "Fighting Filipinos"
- Engagements: Korean War: Operation Tomahawk (1951); Battle of the Imjin River (1951); Battle of Yultong (1951); Battle of Heartbreak Ridge (1951); Battle of Eerie Hill (1952)
- Decorations: Various American Presidential Unit Citations, Filipino Presidential Unit Citation

Commanders
- President: Elpidio Quirino

The Philippine Expeditionary Force to Korea (PEFTOK; Filipino: Ipinadalang Lakas ng Pilipinas sa Korea Korean: 필리핀 한국 원정군; RR: Pillipin Hanguk wonjeonggun; Spanish: Fuerza Expedicionaria Filipina a Corea, FEFC) was the Philippine Army contingent of the United Nations forces that fought in the Korean War (1950–1953). The unit arrived in Korea in August 1950. It was composed of 1,468 troops, and was the fifth largest force under the United Nations Command. The PEFTOK took part in the Battle of Miudong (which was hailed as the first battle won by Filipino soldiers in a foreign soil), Battle of Yultong and the Battle of Hill Eerie. The unit operated alongside the United States 1st Cavalry Division, 3rd Infantry Division, 25th Infantry Division, and 45th Infantry Division.

== Units/Battalions/Regiments ==
=== 2nd Battalion Combat Team (BCT) ===
2nd BCT served in April–May 1954. The "Black Lion" unit was an experienced combat force in the anti-Huk campaign which arrived in South Korea to extend peacekeeping and reconstruction work. Reynaldo Mendoza, who succeeded Col. Antonio de Veyra as battalion commander of the 2nd BCT, received the Ulchi Distinguished Military Service Medal and Korean War Hero Medal for his service and leadership during the expedition.

=== 10th Battalion Combat Team (BCT) ===
10th BCT Tank Co Motorized ("The Fighting Filipinos") led by Lt. Col. Mariano Azurin, later reliefed and led by his 2IC Lt. Col. Dionisio Ojeda received the U.S. Gallantry Award for the April 22–23, Battle of Yultong, where it suffered 10 Killed in action (KIA), 14 Missing in action (MIA), 26 Wounded in action (WIA), and 5 additional KIA in rescue efforts for UN. The Tank Company of the 10th BCT was at the frontline, under the command of Captain Conrado Yap.

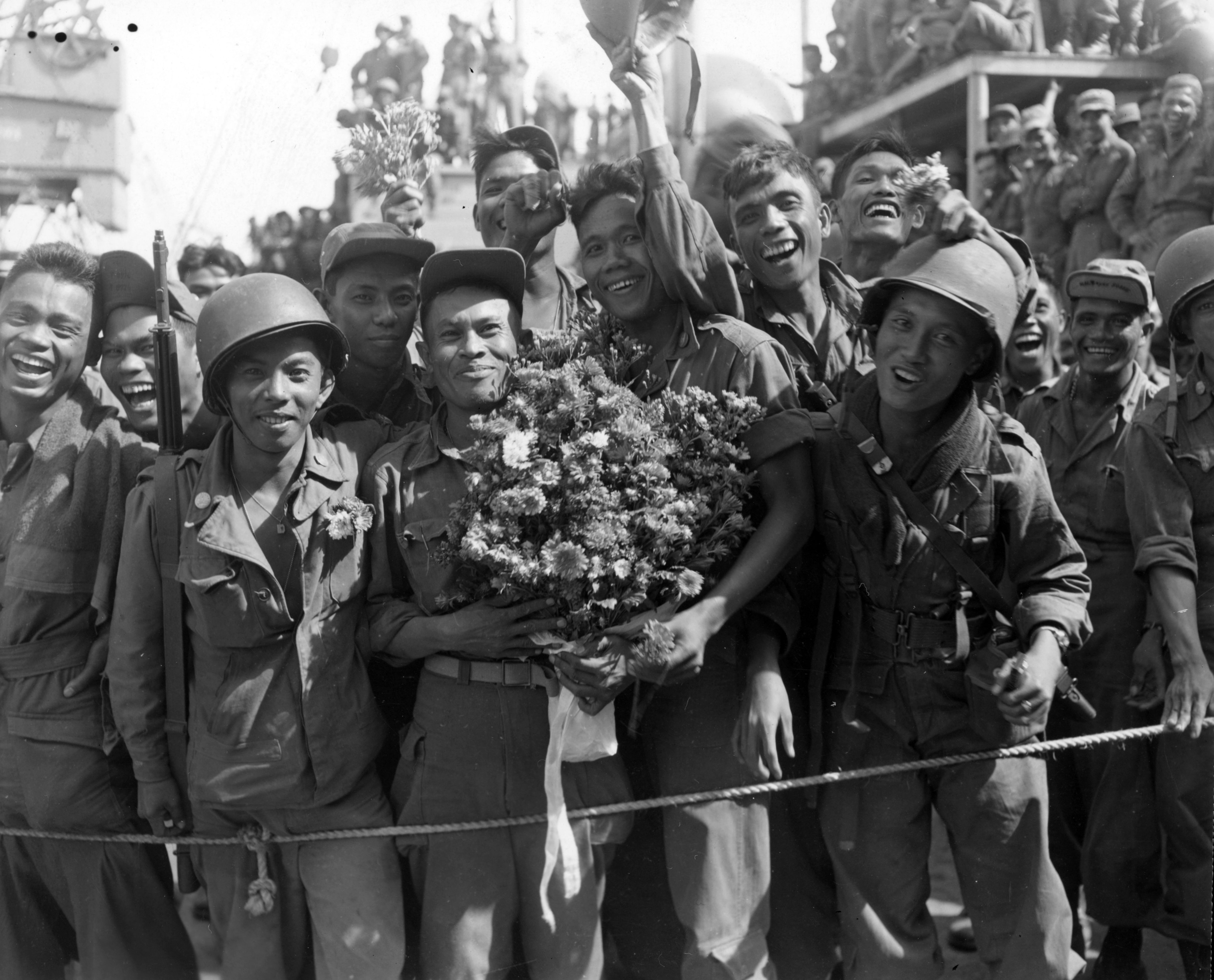
PEFTOK troops after arriving at Busan, September 1950

In the Battle of Miudong which happened in November 1950, at early dawn at the outskirts of Miudong, First Sergeant Maximo P Young and his men were ordered by the US 3rd Infantry Division to secure the area known as Syngue. At around 7:30 a.m. on November 11, 1950, together with other Filipino soldiers of the 10th Battalion Combat Team, they reconnoitered with armored tanks in tow, an area believed to be occupied by enemy forces. As they approached the bend, at around 9:30 a.m. following an explosion which destroyed the army truck up front, a volley of small arms fire met them and a number of Filipino soldiers got hit. FSgt Young was inside the third tank and the personnel of the first and second tanks seemed to have been stunned. FSgt Young assessed and reconnoitered the immediate surroundings via the tank's periscope, then maneuvered to get to the top of the tank and grabbed the machine gun atop the tank's turret. He successfully operated the machine gun as he fired relentlessly at the direction of the enemies. With continuous machine gun fire, FSgt Young repulsed the advancing enemy forces and avoided costly loss of lives among their ranks. This battle was recorded in Korean history as the Battle of Miudong/Syngue and was hailed as the first battle won by Filipinos in foreign soil. FSgt Young was awarded by the Philippine government with the Gold Cross Medal for this heroic feat. On July 27, 2016; FSgt Young who rose to become a Major in the Philippine Army was awarded by the Prime Minister of South Korea, Hwang Kyo-Ahn, the Taegeuk Order of Military Merit.

In the Battle of Yuldong, the biggest battle that the Filipino soldiers fought in the Korean War, Captain Yap was given the authority to withdraw because they were severely outnumbered. Captain Yap's problem was that one of the platoons under his command was being destroyed and he wouldn't leave his men behind. Instead, he counter-attacked and recovered the dead and rescued his wounded men. Unfortunately, he lost his life in the process. He was awarded the Medal of Valor by the Philippines, the Distinguished Service Cross by the U.S. and the Taegeuk Order of Military Merit by South Korea, making him the only Filipino hero decorated by three countries with the most prestigious medal that they could possibly give. The total 10th BCT casualty tally for the war was 43 KIA, 9 MIA, 58 captured. It served from September 1950 to September 1951.

=== 14th Battalion Combat Team (BCT) ===
The 14th BCT ("Avengers") led by Col. Nicanor Jimenez and arrived on March 26, 1953, received the following awards: South Korean Presidential Unit Citation and Philippine Presidential Unit Citation. It served from March 1953 to April 1954.

=== 19th Battalion Combat Team (BCT) ===
The 19th BCT ("Bloodhounds") led by Col. Ramon Aguirre and arrived in late April 1952, received the following awards: South Korea Presidential Distinguished Unit Citation and U.S. X Corps Battle Citation. It served from April 1952 to March 1953.

=== 20th Battalion Combat Team (BCT) ===
The 20th BCT, led by Col. Salvador Abcede suffered 13 KIA, 100 WIA, and 1 MIA. It served from April 1951 to May 1952. Over a four-day period, from May 18 to 21, 1952, this team of Filipino soldiers saw action in the epic Battle of Hill Eerie. Six officers and 22 enlisted men were honored for meritorious services by the Philippine and American governments.

Gold Cross Medals were conferred to three officers: Lt. Benjamin G. Santos, Lt. Cesar Batilo and Lt. Rodolfo Maestro. The latter also received a Bronze Star medal(with 'V'{valor}Device) from the US military for leading the first successful assault on May 18. Lt. Leopoldo Regis received a Distinguished Conduct Star and US Silver Star medal for leadership in the assault on May 19. Lt Fidel Ramos, who led the assault on May 21, was conferred the Military Merit medal. Capt. Rodrigo Sarmiento of the medical detachment was also given the Military Merit medal for meritorious services for the period September 12, 1951, to May 15, 1952.

113 Filipino Soldiers were Killed in Action during the Korean War.

== Prominent members ==
- Mariano C. Azurin – Commander of the 10th Battalion Combat Team (BCT)
- Venancio "Bonny" Serrano
- Benjamin G Santos
- Fidel V. Ramos
- Vicente D. Lustre, Sr
- Fortunato Abat
- Emilio S. Liwanag
- Conrado Yap
- Reynaldo Mendoza
- Ulpiano T. Baluis
- Recaredo R. Albano
- Isabelo B. Bresenio
- Cirilo G. Longui Sr.

== See also ==
- United Nations Forces in the Korean War
- Medical support in the Korean War
- Military history of the Philippines
- Armed Forces of the Philippines
