= United States Forces in the Philippines =

- Active: March 16, 1942 – May 16, 1942
- Disbanded: May 16, 1942
- Countries: United States of America
- Type: Defense force
- Role: Territorial defense
- Size: 150,000
- Part of: United States Army Forces Far East
- Garrison/HQ: Malinta Tunnel, Corregidor
- Anniversaries: April 9
- Engagements: Battle of Bataan Battle of Corregidor; Japanese invasion of Davao; Battle of Digos 1941; Japanese invasion of Zamboanga; Siege of Panay; Siege of Cebu; Japanese invasion of Cotabato; Japanese invasion of Malabang; Japanese invasion of Cagayan de Oro; Battle of Kabacan; Battle of Mangima Canyon Battle of Tankulan

Commanders
- Notable commanders: Lieutenant General Jonathan M. Wainwright IV

Aircraft flown
- Attack: A24 Banshee
- Bomber: B17 Boeing Flying Fortress Heavy Bombers, B10/12 Medium Bombers
- Fighter: P40 Curtiss Warhawks, P35 Severskies, P26 Boeing Peashooters
- Reconnaissance: PBY Seaplanes
- Transport: C46 Commando

United States Forces in the Philippines (USFIP) is a unified command in the Philippines during World War II. It was the successor to the United States Army Forces in the Far East (USAFFE) which General Douglas MacArthur commanded. He moved to Australia as he evacuated as ordered by President Roosevelt in March 1942. The command only lasted two months as it surrendered by Lieutenant General Jonathan M. Wainwright to Lieutenant General Homma Masaharu commander of 14th Army of the Imperial Japanese Army.

== Background ==
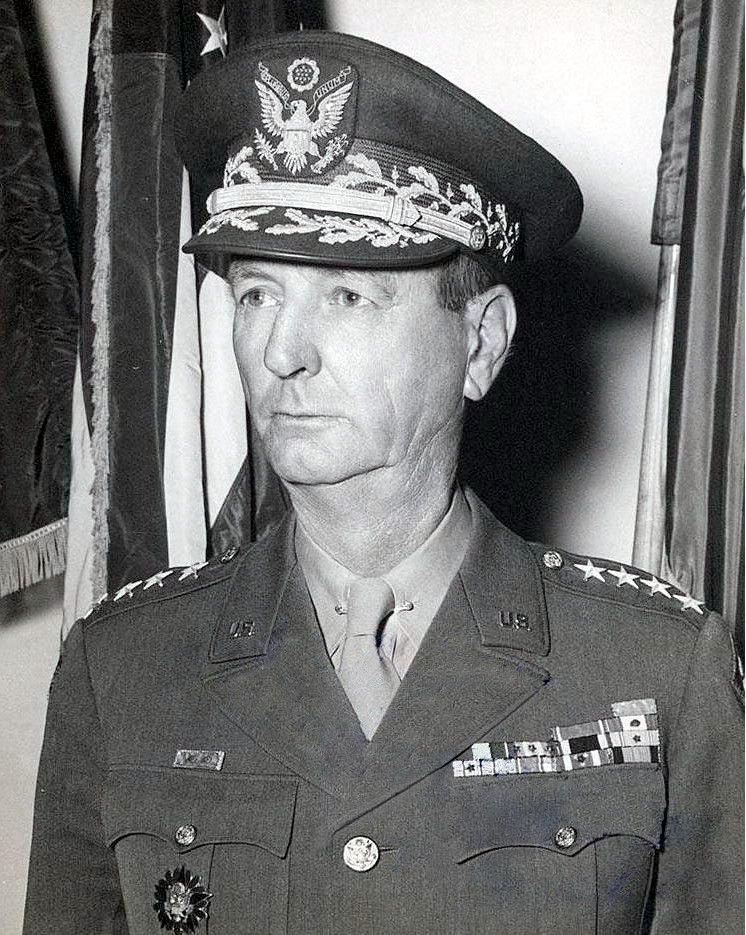
Commanding General Jonathan M. Wainwright, United States Forces in the Philippines March 19, 1942 – May 20, 1942

In February 1942 as Japanese tighten its grip with the Philippine Islands and the situation getting critical and desperate. Supplies could not reach Bataan due to the intensified naval blockade of Imperial Japanese Navy. President Franklin Roosevelt ordered General MacArthur to relocate to Australia in preparation for a build up for an offensive operations against Japan.

MacArthur intended to still control the Filipino–American forces in the Philippines from Australia through his Deputy Chief of Staff in Corregidor Island. He reorganized his and designed it as an independent from each other for an eventuality one unit surrenders the others can still continue to fight. Apparently Washington, D.C was not informed of this ahead by MacArthur.

=== Reorganization ===
MacArthur selected his G4 Supply Colonel Lewis Beebe to remained in Corregidor to act as his deputy Chief of Staff, to issue orders for MacArthur's behalf and managing the supply in Malinta Tunnel. Harbor Defense of Manila and Subic under Major General George F. Moore was retained but renamed as Philippine Coast Artillery Command, with its headquarters in Fort Mills, Corregidor. North Luzon Force and South Luzon Force which are now located in the same location in Bataan Peninsula is now known as Luzon Force under Wainwright with CPY in Mariveles, Bataan. Visayas-Mindanao Force is split into Mindanao Force still with Major General William F. Sharp with its current CPY in Del Monte Field and the new Visayan Force will be under Brigadier General Bradford Chynoweth the commander of 61st Infantry Division in Panay Island with CPY in Cebu. These took effect after MacArthur's departure for Australia on March 16, 1942, from Del Monte Field in Mindanao.

=== Command confusion ===
US War Department with understanding that Wainwright the most senior officer in the Philippines assumed the command from MacArthur sent all communications addressed to him. MacArthur failed to inform Washington, D.C., of his new setup and it created confusion. Beebe, being MacArthur's deputy chief of staff, had no choice but to relay the message of War Department to Wainwright, who was in Bataan. Wainwright assumed the command in Corregidor and made Beebe his chief of staff. Major General Edward P. King Jr was selected to replace Wainwright in Luzon Force.

== Luzon Force ==
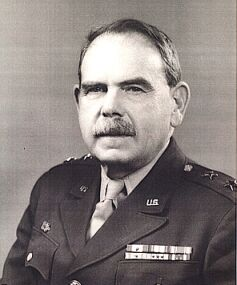
Major General Edward P. King Jr., Commanding General Luzon Force

After five months of fighting the troops for Luzon force on half ration and despite being battered. exhausted, hungry, and sick continued to resist and to keep the line of defense. Lack of ammunition, supplies, and food as ships sent by USAFFE could no longer reach Philippine even in Mindanao due to intensified naval activities of the Japanese Navy and air patrols.

=== Surrender ===
On April 8, 1942, Major General Edward P. King Jr., with no more troops can put up a defensive line went forward together his aides Major Marshall and Hurt to Cabcaben to secure terms of surrender. He ordered all weapons and equipment destroyed except motor transports before moving forward. His surrender was accepted by Colonel Nakayama and 76,000 Filipino-American troops and 20,000 civilians move out and consolidated in Mariveles.

=== Death March ===
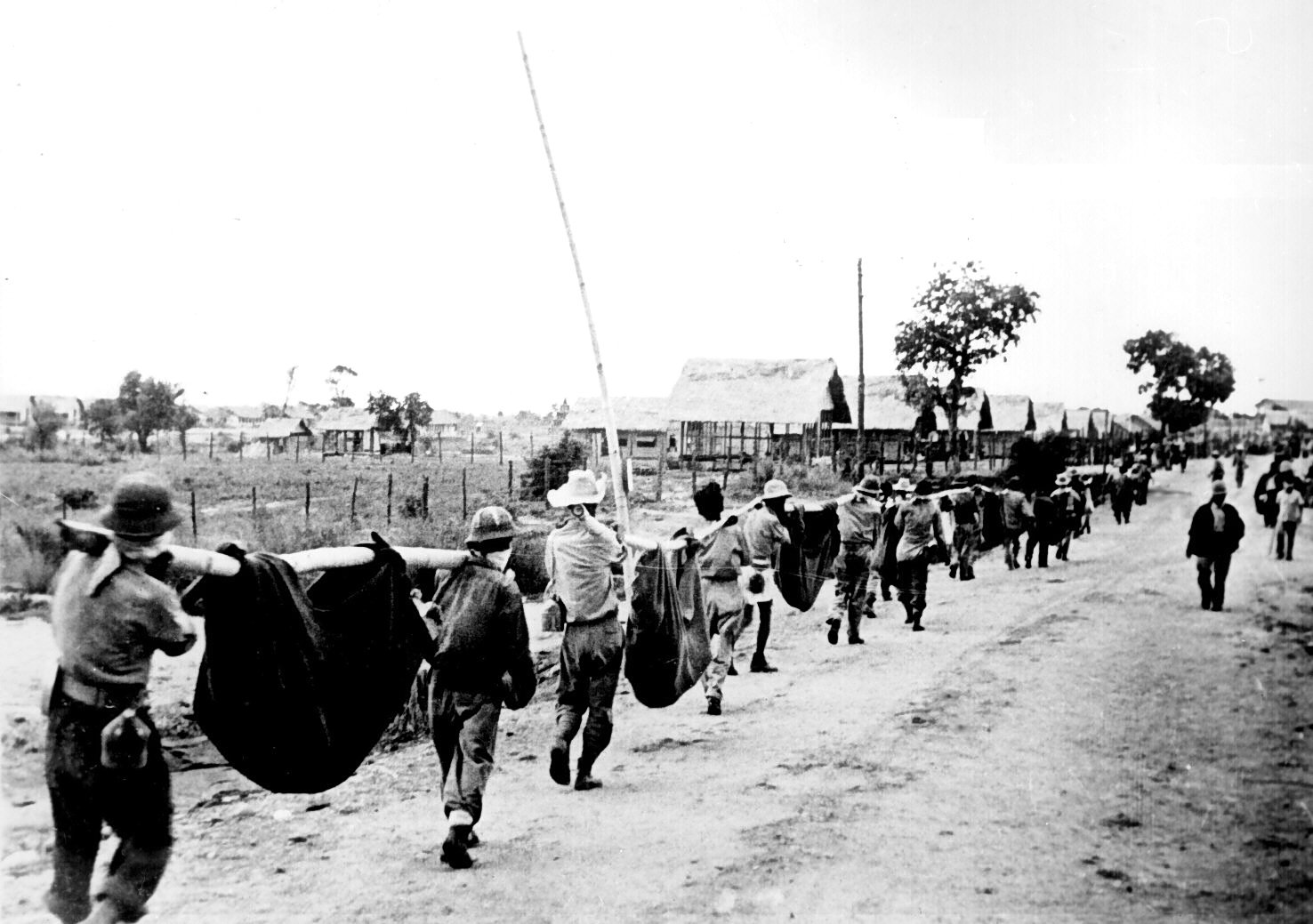

Japanese forced the surrendered troops to marched from Mariveles to San Fernando, Pampanga under the scorching heat from the Sun, no water and food, and sick, around 12,000 more died on road some shot or Bayoneted by their guards which is now known as Bataan Death March. From San Fernando they were box carted towards Capas, Tarlac and incarcerated at Camp O'Donnell. Thousands more died upon reaching Camp O'Donnell in Tarlac to due malaria, dehydration, and starvation as Japanese deprived the prisoners of food and water.

== Siege of Corregidor ==
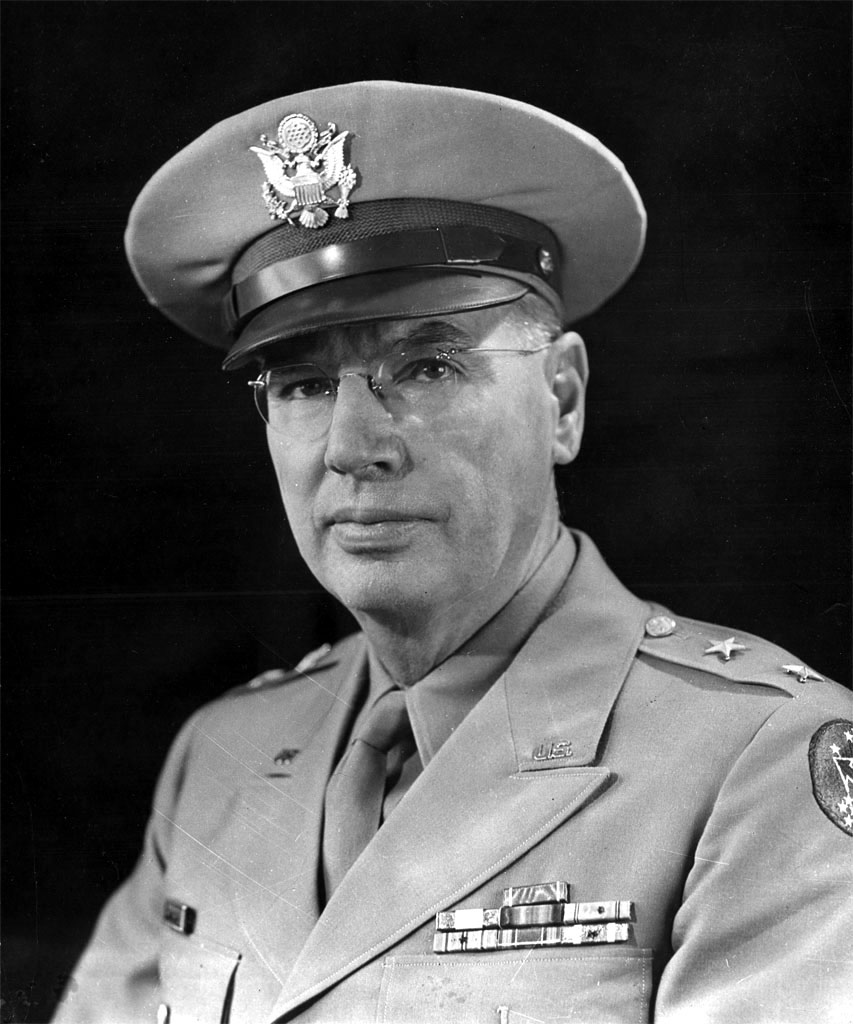
Major General George F. Moore, Philippine Coast Artillery Command.

Homma's focus now is to secure the island of Corregidor, he moved heavy artilleries in Bataan and Cavite. Corregidor was subject of Air and artillery barrage from King's surrender until May 6, 1942.

=== Philippine Coast Artillery Command ===
Coastal Artillery troops under Major General George F. Moore, continue to resist for a month after Bataan surrendered. Brigadier General Paul Bunker commander of the defense of Corregidor.

=== 4th US Marine Regiment ===
The Marine regiment under Colonel Samuel Howard, USMC the regiment was pulled out from Shanghai and was attached to PCAC. The regiment was responsible for the ground defense of Corregidor Island. One of the regiments battalion was captured by the Japanese as they were all still at Shanghai when hostilities started. A provisional battalion was organized from the sailors and crew of sunk ship USS Canupos.

== Visayan Force ==
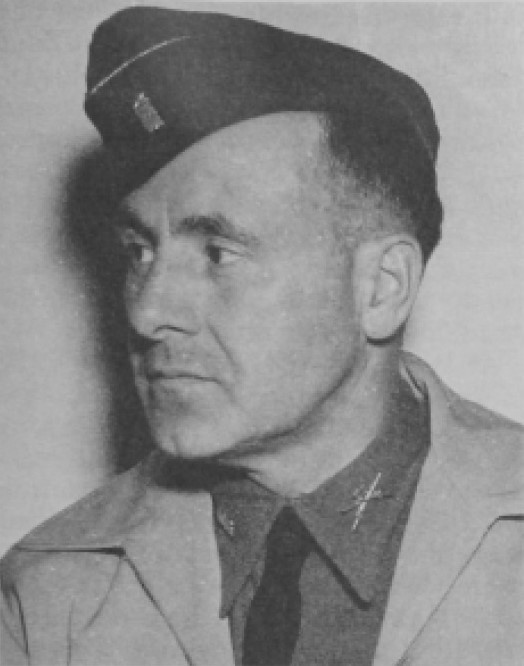
Commanding General, Visayan Force (March 17, 1942 – May 12, 1942)

Brigadier General Bradford Chynoweth assumed command on March 16, 1942, crossing through Negros and established CPY in Camp X, Cantabaco, Cebu. He was not able to fill all his staff posts as the promise from USFIP HQ to send officers did not materialize. He absorbed and used some staff from Cebu Brigade under Colonel Irvine Scudder. As the newest unit organized, Chynoweth commanded it for just a month and had the same problem as the other units; lack of heavy weapons, artillery and antiaircraft guns, ammunition, and supplies.

=== Siege of Cebu ===
On April 9, 1942, Kawaguchi Detachment landed in Cebu, Colonel Irvine Scudder has two infantry regiments 82nd to defend southern Cebu and 83rd to defend northern Cebu. Cebu MP Regiment under Lieutenant Colonel Howard Edmands responsible for the eastern Central Cebu met Japanese landing force in Talisay but with just M2 Browning .50 Caliber Machinegun as its heaviest weapon and Japanese has Naval, Artillery, and Air support, the MPs were overwhelmed and retreated towards Busay. Troops in Toledo was not able to repulse the invading enemy force made Chynoweth and Scudder decided to evacuate Visayan Force HQ inland from Cantabaco. They retreated towards Sudlon and Tabunan. Chief Justice Jose Abad Santos was captured in Barili and was brought to Lanao when Kawaguchi landed there.

=== Siege of Panay ===
Colonel Albert F. Christie assumed command of the Island and 61st Infantry Division, after General Bradford left for Cebu. With 63rd, 64th Provisional, and 65th Provisional Infantry Regiments. Christie commanded a division with 8,000 troops though lack of rifles, they resorted to Bolo and Bow and Arrows. The advantage of this garrison as they prepared for 5 months in bringing food and supplies in the mountains and hills in preparation of guerilla warfare due to disadvantage of lacking fire power. When Kawamura detachment landed on April 16, 1942, Christie's troops did not resist at the beach but prepared ambuscades inland and raids to the positions at night. Christie's troops was never in critical position before it was ordered to surrender.

== Mindanao Force ==
Sharp organized the defense of Mindanao into sectors to defend Japanese landings. Cagayan, Agusan, Lanao, Zamboanga, and Cotabato-Lanao sectors. Muira detachment who was already in Davao since December 20, 1941 was not able to get inland to Sayre highway. Fighting was secluded in Digos sector. If not for the air and naval support his detachment could be defeated. Sakaguchi detachment landed in Jolo, Sulu.

On May 2, 1942, Kawaguchi landed in Lanao on April 28, 1942, where they are met by 61st Infantry Regiment under 81st Infantry Division of General Guy O. Fort in Malabang, Lanao and 102nd Infantry Regiment under 101st Infantry Division of General Joseph Vachon in Cotabato City and Parang in Cotabato Province and few days later Kawamura detachment landed in Macajalar Bay in Cagayan de Oro.

== Reconstitution of Visayas-Mindanao Force ==
On April 19, 1942, three days after the Kawaguchi Detachment landed in Cebu, Wainwright realizing the loss of Cebu and assuming Chynoweth could no longer function his command, ordered Sharp to reconstitute the Visayas-Mindanao Force and him back as commander of that unit to command the remaining garrisons of Visayas islands.

=== Surrender of US Forces in the Philippines ===
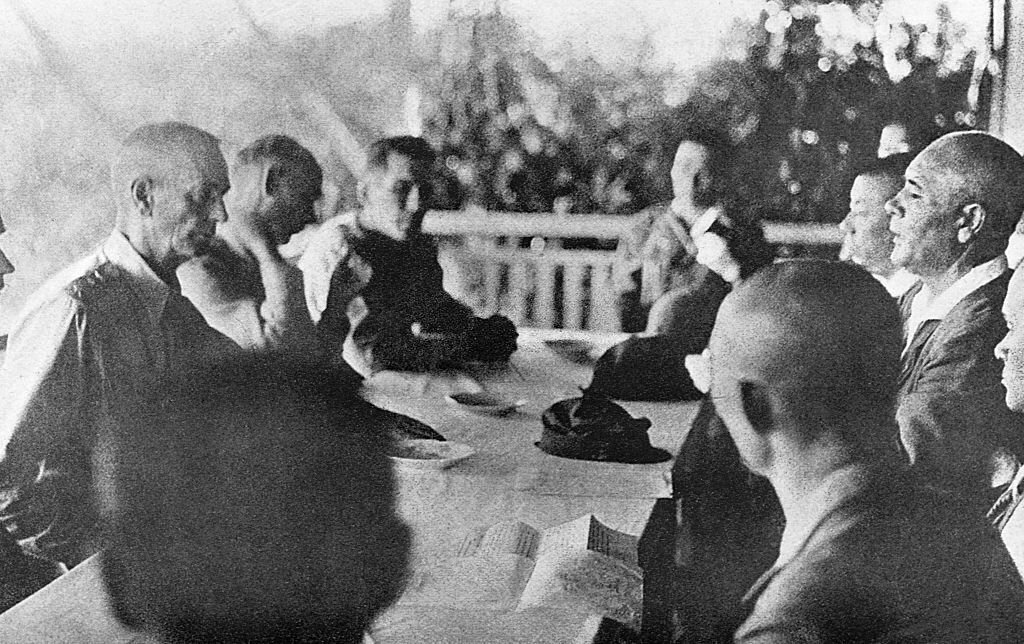
General Wainwright meeting General Homma in Cabcaben, Bataan

On May 10, 1942, Wainwright went to meet Homma to discuss surrender terms of his forces in Corregidor, as Homma insisted on the surrender of all the forces in the Philippines or he will not accept Wainwright's surrender. He broadcast an order for Sharp to surrender and sent Lieutenant Colonel Jesse Traywick as his emissary to Sharp in Mindanao to enforce his surrender order.

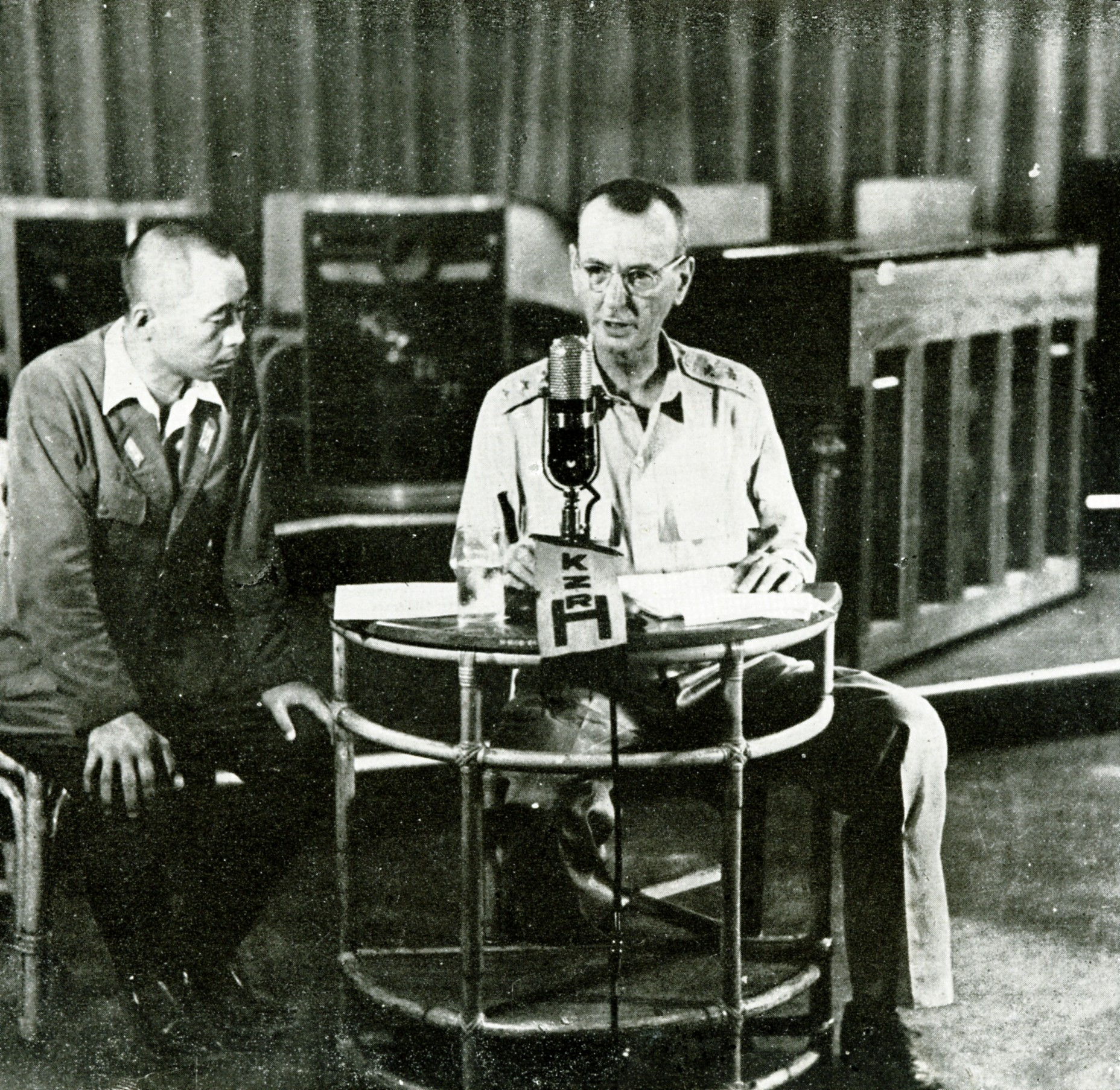
General Wainwright broadcast his order and terms of surrender to General Sharp.

Sharp in turned send several emissaries to different island garrisons in the Visayas to ensure his order is carried immediately. On May 12, 1942, all forces in the southern islands surrendered. Wainwright sent Lieutenant Colonel Gailbrith to contact Colonel John Horan and Major Guillermo Nakar in northern Luzon. Colonel Horan surrendered his troops but Major Nakar refused to surrender 14th Infantry Regiment. Major General Guillermo Francisco was sent to Legaspi to stop the Constabularies for further fighting and surrendered.

Although majority of USFIP surrendered many American and Filipino officers refused, went to hills and established their based and continued to fight as guerilla unit. It took a while to contact Australia or America so these men relied on the support of the Filipinos for food and money. The command cease to exist, Filipino soldiers captured where released in August 1942 while American Prisoners were moved to mainland Luzon and Palawan. Healthy ones are brought to Japan and sick one were keep on POW camps in Tarlac and Cabanatuan which were rescued in 1945 by US Army Rangers.
