= 61st Field Artillery Regiment (Philippine Army) =

Philippine army reserve unit

61st Field Artillery Regiment (PA)
- Active: August 28, 1941 - May 12, 1942
- Disbanded: May 12, 1942
- Countries: United States of America; Philippines
- Allegiance: United States
- Branch: Army
- Type: Field Artillery
- Role: Army Reserve
- Size: 1,800
- Part of: 102nd Infantry Division; 61st Infantry Division
- Garrison/HQ: Camp Cabatuan, Iloilo
- Equipment: M1917 Enfield Rifles M1923 Thompson Submachineguns M1918 Browning Automatic Rifles M1917 Browning Machineguns
- Engagements: Battle of Tagoloan Battle of Mangima Grand Canyon Battle of Puntian
- Decorations: Philippine Distinguished Unit Citation

Commanders
- Notable commanders: Colonel Hiram Tarkington; Lieutenant Colonel John Lewis

Insignia
- Identification symbol

The 61st Field Artillery Regiment was a reserve unit of the Philippine Army, activated in August 1941 as part of the 61st Infantry Division based in Panay. It was originally organized to serve as an artillery unit during World War II. However, its equipment was lost when the SS Corregidor, the vessel transporting its guns, sank after striking a naval mine in Manila Bay. As a result, the regiment fought as infantry for the remainder of the war.

== Organization ==
The regiment was formed from reserve soldiers and was housed at the training camp in Dingle, Iloilo. Most of the personnel were recruited from Panay, while the officers were largely from Luzon. Captain Jacinto Gavino of the Philippine Army served as the initial commander. In September 1941, USAFFE headquarters assigned Major John Lewis and four lieutenants to assist with training. In November 1941, Lieutenant Colonel Hiram Tarkington assumed command, with Major Lewis becoming the executive officer.

=== Battalions ===
The 1st Battalion was initially commanded by Captain Albert Price and was later led by Major Jacinto Gavino. The 2nd Battalion was commanded by Lieutenant Murphy, and subsequently by Captain Trinidad in Mindanao. The 3rd Battalion was first commanded by Captain Walter Wald and was later led by Captain Senen Cleofe.

== Transfer to Mindanao ==
In January 1942, 61st Division Headquarters received a secret order to transfer the 61st Field Artillery Regiment together with the 61st and 62nd Infantry Regiments. On January 5, the regiment departed Panay for Negros Island and travelled by motor transport to the port of Dumaguete. On January 8, 1942, it arrived in Bugo, Misamis Oriental, in Northern Mindanao. A subsequent change of orders directed the unit to remain in the area to defend against a possible Japanese landing.

A new headquarters, the 102nd Infantry Division under Colonel William P. Morse, was activated to command all forces in the Cagayan Sector. The 61st Field Artillery Regiment, 81st Field Artillery Regiment, 62nd Infantry Regiment and 103rd Infantry Regiment were placed under this division.

=== Japanese landing in the Cagayan Sector ===
On May 6, 1942, the Kawamura Detachment from Panay entered Macajalar Bay and began landing operations at Bugo, Tagoloan and Cagayan de Oro. The 61st Field Artillery Regiment had limited engagement. Due to the proximity of Bugo to the Sayre Highway, Colonel Hiram Tarkington withdrew the regiment and redeployed it to Alae. It was subsequently ordered to the reserve area in the Somilao Sector under Colonel William F. Dalton.

=== Puntian ===
The regiment moved to Puntian, deploying in Dalirig with the 93rd Infantry Regiment on its left and the 103rd Infantry Regiment on its right. At dusk, Colonel Tarkington conferred with Colonel Dalton on the defence plan and left Lieutenant Colonel John Lewis in command. Later that evening, Japanese forces launched an intrusion in the Puntian area, but the regiment repulsed the attack at heavy cost. Tarkington rushed back upon hearing of the engagement and reports that Colonel Lewis had been killed. Early the next morning, he learned that Lewis had only been wounded and that the regiment had held its position.

=== Surrender of the Somilao Sector ===
On May 11, 1942, at daybreak, Colonel William F. Dalton, commander of the Somilao Sector, ordered all units under his command to surrender. Colonel Tarkington, despite his reluctance, complied and surrendered his troops. However, he allowed Filipino soldiers who refused to surrender to disperse into the mountains, altering his unit's roster to facilitate their escape. The regiment was assembled and disarmed at Camp Casisang in Malaybalay, where American and Filipino soldiers were separated.

The regiment was disbanded after the war and was never reactivated.

== See also ==
- 61st Infantry Division
- 61st Infantry Regiment
- 62nd Infantry Regiment
- 63rd Infantry Regiment
- Mindanao Force
- Visayas-Mindanao Force
- Bradford Chynoweth
