= Hiram Tarkington =

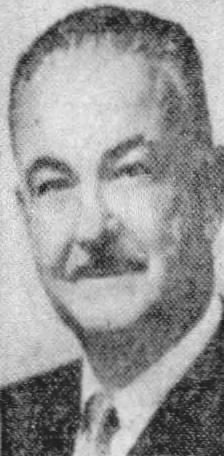
- Tarkington c. 1958
- Born: March 15, 1896; Oxford, North Carolina, U.S.
- Died: October 8, 1996 (aged 100); Unknown (Note: The Social Security Death Index notes Tarkington's last place of residence as Orange Park, Florida, but a source stating his place of death is currently lacking.)
- Burial place: Arlington National Cemetery
- Education: The Citadel
- Military career
- Allegiance: United States
- Branch: United States Army
- Service years: 1918–1954
- Rank: Colonel
- Service number: O10618
- Unit: 24th US Field Artillery Regiment
- Commands: 61st Field Artillery Regiment (Philippines)
- Conflicts: World War I World War II: Battle of Mangima Grand Canyon; Battle of Bugo
- Other work: Director of Florida civil defense (1955–1968)

Hiram Wendell Tarkington (March 15, 1896 – October 8, 1996) was a colonel in United States Army known for commanding the 61st Field Artillery Regiment of the Philippine Army from November 1941 to May 1942. He became a prisoner of war after the surrender of American forces in the Philippines and was imprisoned until the end of the war. After retiring from the Army in 1954, he led civil defense in Florida from 1955 until 1968.

== Biography ==
Tarkington was born on March 15, 1896, in Oxford, North Carolina, to parents William Benjamin Tarkington and Mary S. Lougee. His siblings were sisters Esther, Mary, and brothers Ernestine and Woodrow. He attended Citadel Military College in Charleston, South Carolina, and graduated in 1918.

Tarkington was commissioned a second lieutenant of infantry in May 1918 and was promoted to first lieutenant in September 1919. He fought in France during World War I.

Tarkington transferred to field artillery in June 1920. He was promoted to captain in April 1931 and to major in July 1939.

=== World War II ===
In November 1941, Tarkington was promoted to lieutenant colonel. He was sent to the Philippines to help train the Philippine Army during their expansion in anticipation of Japanese aggression in Asia.

Tarkington arrived in November along with other officers, mostly reserve. Tarkington was sent to Panay to command the 61st Field Artillery Regiment, a component of the 61st Infantry Division under Colonel Bradford G. Chynoweth.

Tarkington's regiment was still waiting for artillery, so he shifted to infantry training. Their artillery—eight 3-inch gun M1918 and four QF 2.95-inch mountain guns—went to the bottom of Manila Bay when the SS Corregidor sunk upon hitting a naval mine. Full infantry training was in effect when a sudden order came to transfer his regiment to Mindanao. His regiment was posted in Bugo, Misamis Oriental, to defend Bugo Port north of Cagayan de Oro.

==== Combat in Mindanao ====
On May 6, 1942, the elite Kawamura Detachment of the 5th Division of the Imperial Japanese Army landed on beaches south of Macajalar Bay.

Tarkington's regiment fought hard but was pushed back and had to retreat towards Sayre Highway, afraid of being cutoff as the 81st Field Artillery under Lieutenant Colonel John Woodridge at their right was pushed back and had to retreat. This retreat also forced the 103rd Infantry Regiment under Major Joseph Webb to withdraw although his regiment made a successful attack on the beachhead that almost repelled the Japanese back to the sea. The 61st Field Artillery now posted in Mangima Grand Canyon in Tankulan, Bukidnon. Tarkington's regiment fought hard in Tankulan as the Japanese made an intrusion during the night. His executive officer was wounded at the end of the engagement. The regiment retreated to Puntian in Somilao, Bukidnon, to mount another defensive line, but on May 11, 1942, Tarkington was visited by Colonel William F. Dalton, Somilao Sector Commander, and was ordered to surrender at daybreak.

==== Prisoner of war ====
Tarkington assembled his regiment to Camp Kasisang, Bukidnon, along with other units for formal surrender. All Americans were separated from Filipino soldiers, who were released in August 1942. Tarkington and other Americans officers in Mindanao were brought to Cagayan to board a ship Luzon. They were imprisoned in Cabanatuan. Later, they were brought to Subic Bay to board a ship, which was brought to Manchuria (then the Japanese puppet state of Manchukuo). Contemporary newspaper accounts also mention detainment in Formosa, prior to Manchuria. Tarkington and his colleagues remained imprisoned until the end of the war, liberated during the Soviet invasion of Manchuria.

=== Later years ===
By late 1946, Tarkington was senior instructor for the Organized Reserve in Florida. He was promoted to colonel in March 1948, and was named commander of the Florida military district in mid-1950. Tarkington retired from the Army in 1954. In 1955, he was appointed as director of civil defense in Florida, a position he held until retiring in 1968.

=== Personal life ===
Tarkington married Pauletta Anning of Tacoma, Washington, in September 1919. They divorced in 1925. He later married Zella Maud Munro, also of Tacoma—they were married as of the 1930 United States census, at which time they were living at Fort Bragg in North Carolina. As of 1968, they were living in Jacksonville, Florida. At the time of his retirement, it was reported that the couple planned to move to Ajijic, Mexico. Zella Tarkington died in 1978.

Tarkington wrote an unpublished account of his experiences during World War II, There Were Others, which can be found online. He died on October 8, 1996, at the age of 100. He was buried in Arlington National Cemetery.
