= 64th Provisional Infantry Regiment (PA) =

64th Infantry (Provisional) Regiment (PA)
- Active: January 1942 - May 1942
- Disbanded: May 12, 1942
- Countries: United States of America; Philippine Commonwealth
- Allegiance: United States Army; Philippine Commonwealth Army
- Branch: Army
- Type: Infantry
- Role: Territorial Defense
- Size: 1,500
- Part of: 61st Infantry Division
- Garrison/HQ: Dingle, Iloilo
- Equipment: M1917 Enfield .30 Caliber Bolt Action Rifle; Bolo; Arrow
- Engagements: Japanese Invasion of Panay

Commanders
- Notable commanders: LCol. Macario Peralta Jr., LCol. Crispin Gorriceta; LCol. Cesar Hechanova; LCol Lyle Fritzpatrick; LCol. James Bickerton; LCol. Amos Francia

64th Infantry Regiment, is a provisional unit of Philippine Commonwealth Army under 61st Infantry Division activated and organized in Panay Island. It fought the Japanese invaders in the island from April 18, 1942, to May 12, 1942, after ordered to surrender by Visayas-Mindanao Force commander Major General William F. Sharp.

== Background ==
After General Sharp moved his headquarters in Mindanao, he ordered bulked of his units to Mindanao as well. 61st Division units was ordered to release 61st Infantry under Colonel Mitchell based in Negros, 62nd Infantry under Colonel Thayer, and 61st Field Artillery under Colonel Tarkington and transfer to Mindanao via Negros. This leaving only one regiment in the island, General Bradford Chynoweth commander of 61st Division without delay, organized 2 new regiments out from trainees and new recruits in the island.

Initially it was named 61st Provisional Infantry and 62nd Provisional Infantry to replace the previous regiments who left the island. However, in order not to create confusion it was renamed to 64th Infantry (Provisional) initially under Lieutenant Colonel Amos Francia, but later replaced by Lieutenant Colonel James Bickerton. After reorganization of the division staff Lieutenant Colonel Lyle Fritzpatrick replaced Colonel Bickerton who was transferred as division staff.

The regiment participated in the Operation Baus Au initiated by General Chynoweth before he was ordered to assumed command of the new Visayas Force base in Cebu. The command of the island was passed on to Colonel Albert Christie as commander of Panay Force and 61st Infantry Division.

=== Japanese Invasion ===
On April 18, 1942, two days after the Kawaguchi Detachment invaded Cebu, the Kawamura detachment invaded Panay in three 3 different landing zones. The 64th Infantry was assigned to Capiz Province to thwart any Japanese landings but Naval and Air bombardment prevented them to do so due to absence of a single artillery gun in the Island. They retreated inland and resorted to ambuscades and raids to Japanese warehouses inflicting heavy casualties to the Japanese. However, this did not prevent Kawamura Detachment turnover Panay to 10th Independent Garrison to leave for Mindanao.

On May 11, 1942, order came from Mindanao to surrender at daybreak, Lieutenant Colonel Allen Thayer a representative from General Sharp from Visayas-Mindanao Force Headquarters in Mindanao to enforce the order. On May 12, 1942, Colonel Christie surrendered his Division to the Japanese forces in Cabatuan, Iloilo. However, some officers and men did not obeyed his ordered and continue to fight on as guerilla led by former Division G3 Operations Officer and now commander of the regiment Lieutenant Colonel Macario Peralta Jr., of the Philippine Army.

== See also ==
- 61st Infantry Division
- 63rd Infantry Regiment
- Bradford Chynoweth
- Visayan Force
- Visayas-Mindanao Force
