= Japanese invasion of Panay =

Part of the Philippines campaign of WW2

Japanese Invasion of Panay Island
- Part of the Philippines campaign (1941–1942), Pacific Theater
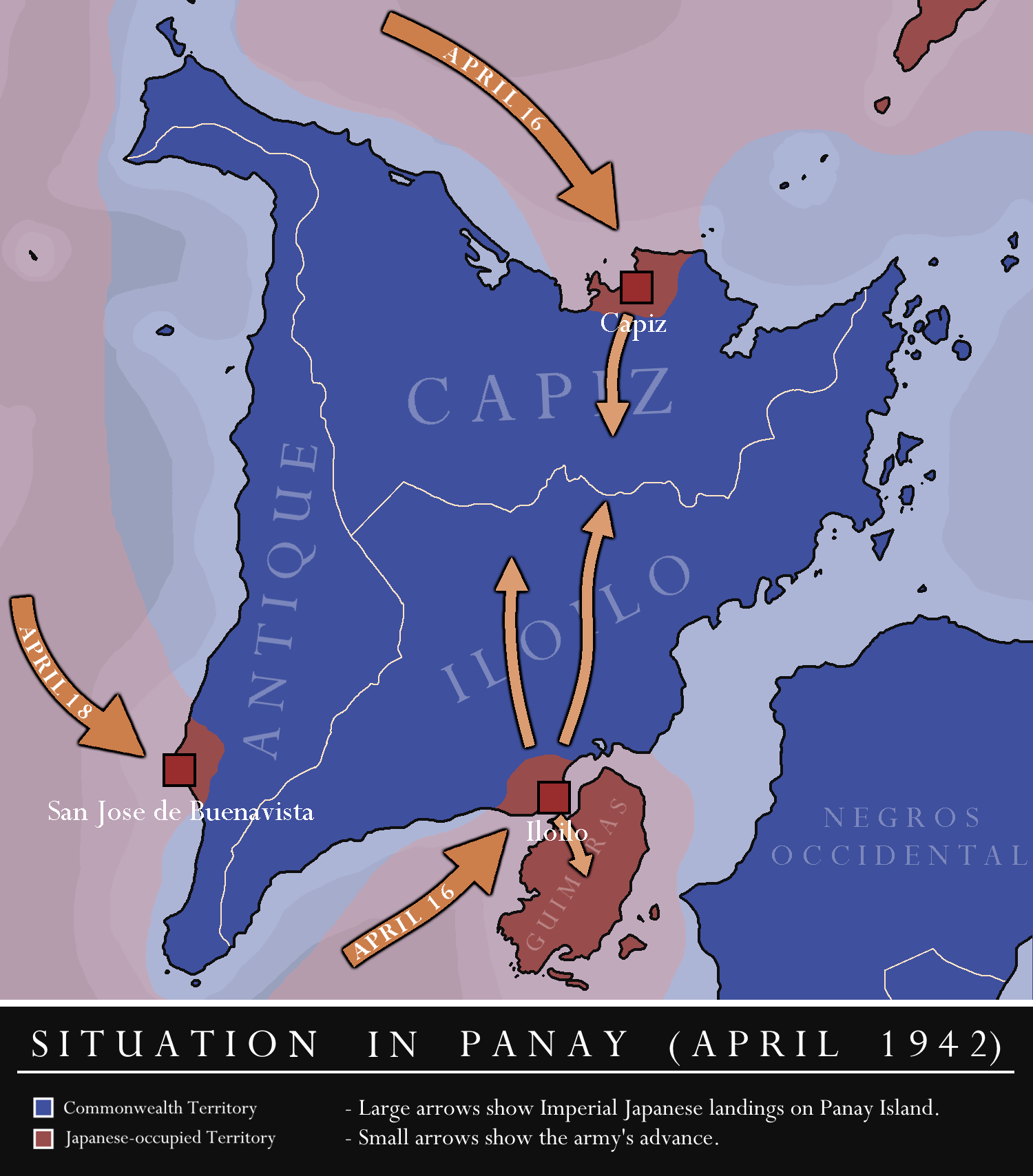
Date	April 16 – 18, 1942
Location	Panay, Visayas, Philippines
Result	Japanese victory
Territorial changes	Panay captured by the Japanese

Belligerents
Empire of Japan	United States of America: Commonwealth of the Philippines

Commanders and leaders
(Empire of Japan) Kawamura Saburo	(United States) Bradford Chynoweth (United States) Albert F. Christie (United States) Franklin Fliniau (United States) James Bickerton (United States) Lyle J. Fritzpatrick (Commonwealth of the Philippines) Macario Peralta

Units involved
Ground units: Japanese Fourteenth Army Kawamura Detachment: 9th Infantry Brigade; 41st Infantry Regiment; Aerial units: 22nd Air Brigade	Ground units: Philippine Commonwealth Army: 61st Infantry Division; 63rd Infantry Regiment; 61st Provisional Infantry Regiment; 62nd Provisional Infantry Regiment; 61st Engineer Battalion; 61st Medical Battalion; Philippine Constabulary: Panay PC Company; Capiz PC Company; Antique PC Company

Strength
4,106 Japanese Troops; 4 Cruisers 11 Transports	7,000 Filipino and American Troops 500 PC Constabularies

Japanese invasion of Panay (Filipino: Paglusob ng mga Hapones sa isla ng Panay, Hiligaynon: Pagsulong sang mga Hapon sa Panay) on April 16–18, 1942 was the second landing in the Visayas Islands after Fil-American forces surrendered in Bataan on April 9, 1942. It is the next step to prevent any supplies reach Corregidor Island and control the Visayas waters and established bases for the campaign to invade island of Mindanao to complete the invasion of the Philippines.

== Background ==
After the surrender of Luzon Force in Bataan, Imperial Japanese 14th Army sent two detachments to besiege the Visayas Islands that could be made bases for the invasion of Mindanao. Kawaguchi detachment was sent to capture Cebu and Kawamura detachment followed to sieged Panay.

Since assuming the command 61st Division and Panay Island commander Colonel Albert F. Christie continued to implement the Operation Baus Au, after the previous commander Brigadier General Bradford Chynoweth assumed the new command of Visayan Force and moved to Cebu in mid-March. 61st Division has added two infantry regiments since February after 61st, 62nd Infantry and 61st Field Artillery was transferred to Mindanao. Its strength has reached to 8,000 personnel, however there was a shortage of rifles, ammunition, and no artillery pieces at all in the island.

=== Invasion ===
Kawamura Detachment under Major General Kawamura Saburo arrived in Panay from Lingayen, Pangasinan on April 12, 1942. It landed on three points of Panay, a group landed in Capiz City, Capiz another group landed in San Jose, Antique and the large group among the three landed in Jaro north of Iloilo City. Colonel Christie's troops retreated inland into the hills and mountain based they prepared for the last four months. The Panay Force is now waging guerilla warfare by conducting ambushes against small Japanese units and raiding Iloilo at night to destroy supplies.

=== Aftermath ===
With Panay island now in total control of the Japanese, with Panay and Cebu islands in the firm grip of the Japanese. Homma can now launch Kawamura and Kawaguchi Detachments to Mindanao. Kawamura Detachment was replaced by three battalions of 10th Independent Garrison, to prepare for invasion of Mindanao. On April 15, 1942 Major General Kawamura received an order to proceed to Macajalar Bay in Cagayan de Oro, Misamis Oriental. Leaving 10th Independent Garrison in control of Panay.

== Surrender ==
In May 11, 1942 Colonel Christie received an order from General Sharp who is now the commander of Visayas and Mindanao forces after reconstitution of the previous command. Despite his protest and inquiries he was forced to surrender when General Sharp's emissary Lieutenant Colonel Allen Thayer arrived to enforce the order.
