= Eugene H. Mitchell =

- Born: Eugene Hill Mitchell; October 27, 1894; Clay, Illinois
- Died: January 20, 1970 (aged 75) Austin, Travis, Texas, USA
- Buried: Bexar, San Antonio, Texas
- Branch: United States Army
- Service years: 1917–1946
- Rank: Colonel
- Service number: O007463
- Commands: 61st Infantry Regiment (Philippines)
- Conflicts: Battle of Lanao
- Spouse: Bernice H. Mitchell
- Children: Doris D. Mitchell; Fred Hartel Mitchell

Eugene H. Mitchell, is Colonel in the United States Army who served from 1917 to 1946. He was known to command 61st Infantry Regiment of the Philippine Commonwealth Army part of 61st Infantry Division in Panay Island and later Negros Island.

He arrived in the Philippines on November 20, 1941, and was immediately sent to Island of Panay to report to 61st Division commander Colonel Bradford Chynoweth for conference and has to leave immediately sent to Negros Island were his unit is posted.

His regiment was ordered transferred to Mindanao and was deployed in southern of Lanao now attached to 81st Infantry Division under Brigadier General Guy O. Fort.

He led his regiment to fight Japanese forces who landed in Parang, Cotabato and Malabang, Lanao and moved upward towards Ganassi, Lanao. His troops made a valiant effort but without artillery and air support which Japanese has. His regiment was dispersed several times he escaped twice avoiding capture to mount another defensive position. However, his last defensive were his troops were routed and he himself got captured.

On May 11, he was sent to Cebu to relay General Sharp's order to General Chynoweth to surrender his troops. He became prisoner of war and was brought to Luzon and later to Formosa.

== See also ==
- 61st Infantry Regiment
- Japanese invasion of Malabang
- 81st Infantry Division
