= 63rd Infantry Regiment (PA) =

- Active: December 1941 – May 1942
- Disbanded: May 12, 1942
- Countries: United States of America; Philippine Commonwealth
- Allegiance: United States Army; Philippine Commonwealth Army
- Branch: Army
- Type: Infantry
- Role: Infantry
- Size: 1,500
- Part of: 61st Infantry Division
- Garrison/HQ: Cabatuan Barracks, Iloilo
- Equipment: M1917 Enfield .30 Caliber Rifles, M1918 Browning .30 Caliber Automatic Rifles, M1917 Browning .30 Caliber Machineguns, 3inch Stokes Mortar

Commanders
- Notable commanders: Lieutenant Colonel Lyle Fritzpatrick; Colonel Carter McClennan

Insignia
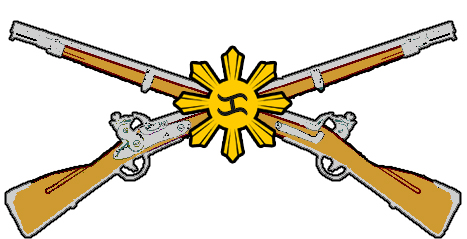
- Identification symbol

63rd Infantry Regiment is a reserve unit of Philippine Army activated and organized during World War II. I was organized from reservist and recruits high school and college students around the 6th Military District. It is part of the 61st Infantry Division activated to cover the island of Panay. The regiment fought entirely in Panay island until it was ordered to surrendered on May 12, 1942.

== Background ==
The regiment was initially commanded by Lieutenant Colonel Albert F. Christie upon its activation in October 1941 in Romblon. However, then Colonel Bradford Chynoweth the newly designated commander of the 61st Infantry Division selected Christie as his division Chief of Staff. He was replaced by Lieutenant Colonel Carter McClennan as its commander in late November. It was inducted to USAFFE on November 15, 1941. Training and organization was still on going when World War II in the Philippines started in early December 1941. The regiment was ordered to transfer to Panay Island. The island was subject to aerial bombardment on the day it arrived in Panay, after forces in Luzon retreat in Bataan.

On January 1, 1942, General Sharp ordered General Chynoweth to send 61st and 62nd Infantry regiments and the 61st Field Artillery to Mindanao, leaving only 63rd Infantry as its combat unit in the island.

=== Order of Battle ===
- Staff
  - CO – LCol. Richard A. Kenney | LCol James Bickerton | LCol Carter McLennan
  - XO – Major Richard A. Kenney
  - S1 & Adjutant
  - S2 Intelligence – 1Lt. Donald A. Amend
  - S3 Operations – 1Lt. Adolph Newson Albrecht
  - S4 Supply
- HQ Battalion – Capt. Julian Chaves
- 1st Battalion – Capt. Lyton | Capt. Julian Chaves
- 2nd Battalion – Major James Bickerton | Capt. Munroy
- 3rd Battalion – Captain Woodroof

=== Change of Command ===
In March 1942, General Chynoweth assumed the new command Visayan Force and transferred to Cebu island. Division was passed to Colonel Christie and 63rd Infantry Regiment passed on to Lieutenant Colonel Lyle Fritzpatrick after McClennan was ordered by Chynoweth to transfer to Negros to assume command of the island as Colonel Roger Hilsman health is a suspect and ordered him to moved to Cebu to recuperate. Later Lieutenant Colonel Richard A. Kenney took over the command.

=== Operation Baus Au ===
Commander of 61st Division, General Chynoweth, realizing they could not meet the Japanese at the beaches due to no artillery pieces arrived in the island, implemented Baus Au program which would bring foods, weapons, and other supplies inland and up to the hills which later he will implement in the entire Visayas islands as he assumed the Visayan Force in March. 63rd Infantry Regiment was the main unit involved in this operations as cargadores adopting the insignia of carabao sled.

== Japanese Siege of Panay ==
After Luzon Force capitulated in Bataan Peninsula, 14th Imperial Japanese Army now has available forces to capture the southern islands of the Philippines. Kawamura detachment was ordered by Homma to secure Panay, with 6 transport and 4 destroyer escorts arrived in Panay on April 16, 1942. Landed in the three sites of the Panay island Jaro southeast of Panay just south of Iloilo City, Capiz town on the northwest, and in San Jose in Antique province at the west of the island.

63rd Infantry and other regiments did not opposed these landings but melted inland and waited for the Japanese to go inland where they laid ambuscades resulting to heavy casualties to the Japanese. 63rd also conducted night raids in Iloilo City destroying and burning warehouses where Japanese supplies are stored. Because of this the Japanese could not penetrate inland of Panay island only concentrated their forces at the coast town and Iloilo City.

=== Surrender ===
On May 12, 1942, Colonel Alberto F. Christie surrendered the Panay Garrison as ordered by Major General William F. Sharp commander of reconstituted Visayas-Mindanao Force due to no communication of Visayan Force HQ. Only handful of his men surrendered and the rest opted to stay in the mountains and continue the fight as guerillas.
