= Ludovico Arroyo Bañas =

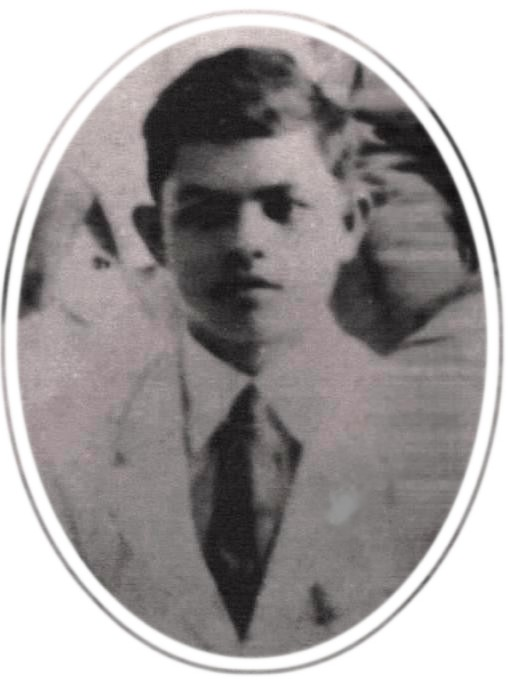
- Ludovico Arroyo Bañas, c. 1919, a pensionado at the US Naval Radio School in Cavite, Philippines.

Regional Telecommunications Superintendent, Republic of the Philippines, Region IV (Panay, Negros, Romblon, Palawan)
- In office 11 December 1957 to 16 February 1966

Telecommunications Bureau, United States of America, Insular Government (Philippines), Radio Puerto Princessa and Radio Culion, Palawan.
- In office 1919 – 22 December 1921

Telecommunications Bureau, United States of America, Insular Government (Philippines), (Iloilo City Station) Assistant Radio Inspector; Chief Operator; on several occasions, also concurrently designated as Assistant Radio Inspector or Acting Radio Inspector for the Port of Iloilo.
- In office 22 December 1921 – 2 January 1942

Civilian Employee Warning Service of the United States of America (Iloilo City Station) Personnel
- In office 10 October 1941 – 2 January 1942

Radio Officer of the Signal Company of the 61st Division, 6th Military District of the USAFFE's Philippine Army Military Officer
- In office 2 January 1942 – 16 April 1942

Radio Officer of the Signal Company of the 61st Division, 6th Military District of the USAFFE's Philippine Army Military Officer
- In office 5 November 1942 – ---------

Radio Officer of the Signal Company of the 64th Infantry Regiment, 6th Military District of the USAFFE's Philippine Army Military Officer
- In office --------- – end of World War II

Chief Operator, Bureau of Posts, Commonwealth of the Philippines, Iloilo City Station
- In office April 1946 – 1947

Chief Operator, Bureau of Telecommunications, Republic of the Philippines, Iloilo City Station
- In office 1947 – 11 December 1957

Personal details
- Born: 16 February 1901
- Died: 27 June 1979 (aged 78) Iloilo City, Philippines
- Resting place: La Paz Catholic Cemetery
- Spouse: Carmen Jalandoni Jover
- Children: 8
- Profession: Telecommunications Superintendent, Soldier

Military service
- Allegiance: Philippines; United States of America; Commonwealth of the Philippines
- Rank: 2Lt. Ludovico Arroyo Bañas

Ludovico Arroyo Bañas (16 February 1901 – 27 June 1979) was a high official of the Philippine Bureau of Telecommunications (currently called National Telecommunications Commission) who was one of the local American-trained pioneers in Telecommunications service in the Philippines during the American Regime in the Country and who, through his professional specialization and expertise, made some significant contribution in the liberation of the Philippines during the World War II, in the field of communications.

== Service in the Bureau of Telecommunications in the Philippines ==
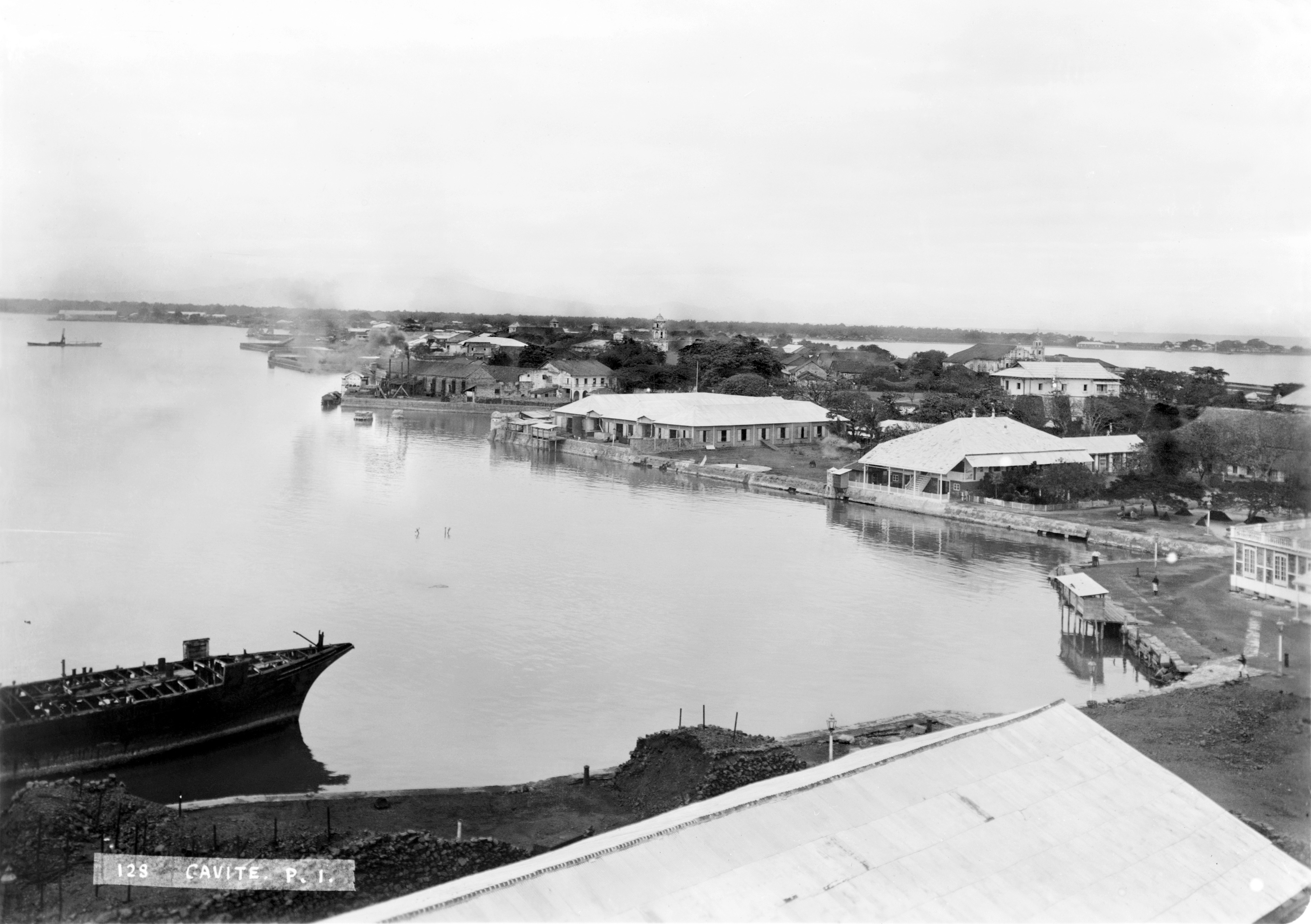
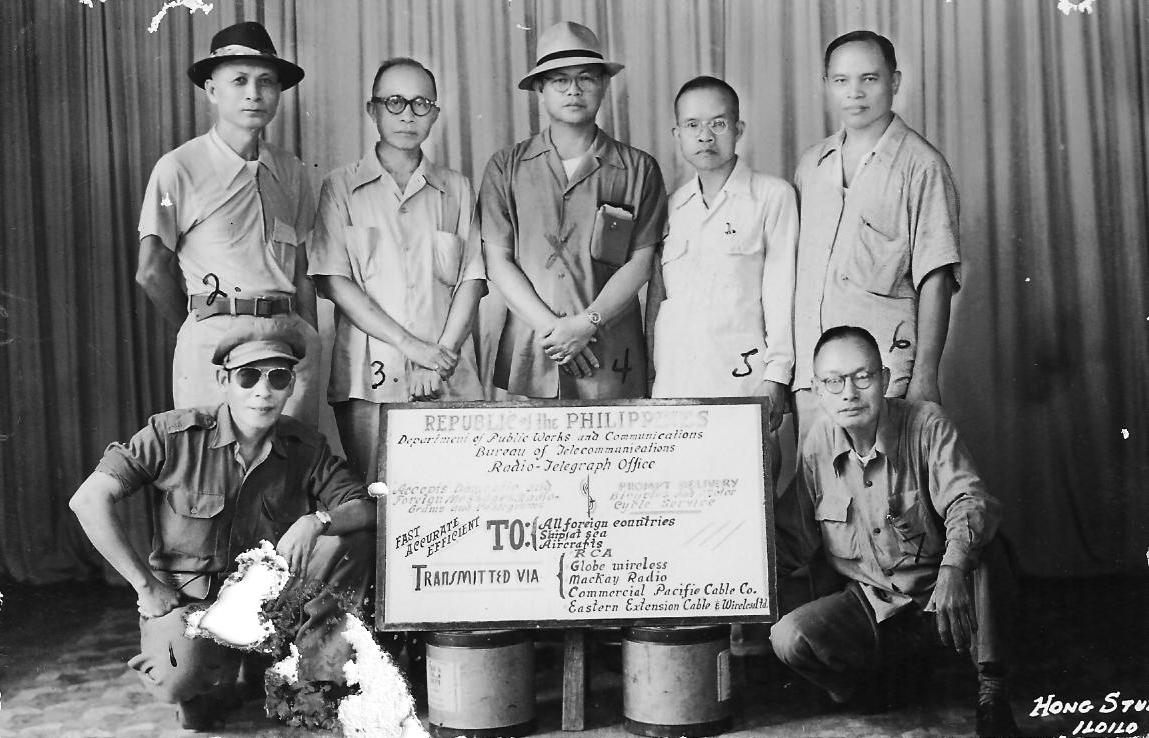
Left to right: [1] Photo of the skyline of the old Port City of Cavite in 1899 (shortly after the American takeover of the port), taken from a ship docked at the Naval shipyard, with the churches visible at maximum resolution.; [2] Photo of Ludovico Arroyo Bañas (center), Philippine Bureau of Telecommunications Superintendent for Region IV (Panay, Negros, Romblon, and Palawan), with his staff (c. late 1950s).

During the American Regime, Ludovico Arroyo Bañas started in the government service as a Grade V teacher in Valladolid, Negros Occidental, on 1 January 1919. Later, he transferred to the Bureau of Posts as a student operator in the Posts-Telegraph School. After passing a competitive examination for penionados wherein he ranked among the first ten in a group of 398 candidates, he was sent with the first and only and only batch of pensionados to undergo advanced training in wireless telegraphy (radio), at the United States Naval Radio School in Sangley Point Cavite, on 15 August 1919. The training of the ten Filipinos was made possible through a special arrangement between the US Naval authorities in the Philippines and the Insular Government. To select the trainees, a special examination was conducted among the 398 students of the Bureau of Posts' Telegraph School.

After graduating with distinction, Bañas was assigned to Radio Puerto Princessa, Palawan and, later, he was transferred to Radio Culion (also in Palawan). Six years later, on 22 December 1921, he was reassigned in Iloilo, where he was promoted to the office of Assistant Radio Inspector and, after a few months, to the rank of Chief operator until the World War II broke out in 1942. On several occasions, he was also concurrently designated as Assistant Radio Inspector or Acting Radio Inspector for the Port of Iloilo.

After serving the U.S. Army Forces Far East (USAFFE) during the war, Bañas left the military service in 1945, with the rank of Second Lieutenant. He went back to Telecommunications service (this time under the Philippine Republic) in April 1946, as Chief Operator of the Bureau of Posts in Iloilo City. Later, he became the Regional Superintendent of the Bureau of Telecommunications (BUTEL) in Region IV (Panay, Negros, Romblon, and Palawan). He was promoted to this position left vacant by Mr. Mariano Tolentino, on 11 December 1957, bringing with him a long experience in Telecommunications service. He occupied this post until the time of his retirement at the age of sixty-five years, on 16 February 1966, after forty-seven years of continuous service since 1 April 1919. He died on 27 June 1979.

== Military service during World War II ==
At the beginning of the War (on 10 October 1941 ), Ludovico Arroyo Bañas was drafted in the Civilian Employee Warning Service of the United States of America (Iloilo City Station), under the command of Major Campbell. This task was short-lived for on 2 January 1942, he was inducted to the USAFFE, in Sta. Barbara, Iloilo by Lt. Col Crispen Gorriceta. From 4 January to 16 April 1942, he was assigned as Radio Officer (with the rank of Second Lieutenant) of the 64th Infantry Regiment, of the 61st Division, Philippine Army, stationed in Sta. Barbara. Lt. Col Amos Francia, who was in command of the unit, disbanded his men on 17 April of that same year. That forced Bañas to go home to Banate, Iloilo, where he farmed his land.

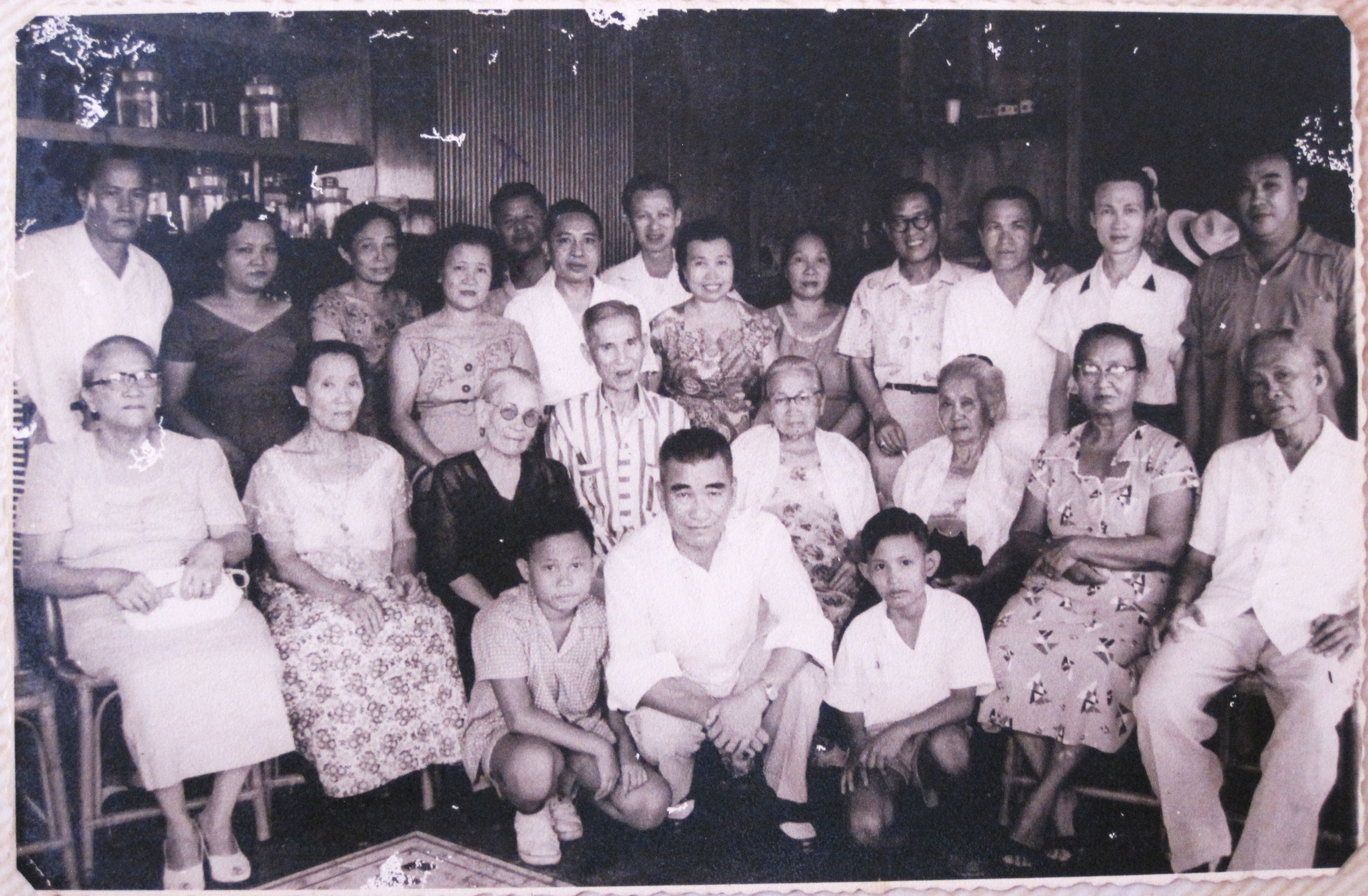
Ludovico Arroyo Bañas with the family of his wife Carmen Jalandoni Jover during a clan gathering sometime in 1950s. Ludovico is behind his wife Carmen (standing, fourth from the left), while Iloilo City Mayor Dominador Jalandoni Jover (also standing) could be found fourth from the right.

Lack of equipment, difficult terrain and undeveloped infrastructure made coordination of the groups of disbanded USAFFE forces nearly impossible, and for several months in 1942 all contact with Philippine resistance forces was lost. Communications were restored in November 1942 when the reformed 6th Military District in Panay island, led by Col. Macario Peralta Jr., was reorganized.

Upon the reorganization of the 6th Military District in Panay, Ludovico Arroyo Bañas again joined the defense of his Country, and worked with Capt. Eliseo Espia in the Signal Company of the 61st Division (stationed in Passi, Iloilo), on the 5th of that month. Later, he was sent to the Signal Company of the 64th Infantry Regiment of same Military District, under the Command of Lt. Col. Cesar Hechanova, where he served until the end of the war.

2Lt Ludovico Arroyo Bañas distinguished himself as a member of the Filipino forces during the war, in the field of communication. He was responsible in successfully making the first radio contact with the Allied Forces, months after the United States Armed Forces was disbanded in the Philippines. He, together with his team, used a home made-made transmitter in establishing the first two-way radio contact with the United States in November 1943, affirming the continuous existence of Filipino resistance forces against the Japanese, thereby providing the joint and combined U.S. and Philippine Commonwealth military forces important data for the liberation of the Philippines. This enabled the forwarding of intelligence regarding Japanese forces in the Philippines to SWPA command, as well as the consolidating the once sporadic guerrilla activities, thereby allowing the guerrillas to help in the war effort.

== Other Personal Achievements, Family and Marriage ==
Ludovico was one of the three sons of Celestino Barboza Bañas and Francisca Arroyo, both were native and residents of Banate, Iloilo, Philippines. His siblings were Martin and Maximo. He was married to Carmen Jalandoni Jover - sister of Dominador Jalandoni Jover, who was Mayor of Iloilo City. The couple had seven daughters (Thelma, Alsina, Maja, Emma, Manajama, Nancy, and Francely) and a son (Richard).

At the end of his service to the Philippine Government, Bañas was holding a first class radio-telegraph operator license, as well as a radio-telegraph civil service eligibility. He was also designated by the National Civil Defense Administration as the Chief of Telecommunications Service in Iloilo City.

== Service Medals and Ribbons ==
- Philippine Liberation Medal & Ribbon
- Asiatic-Pacific Campaign Medal & Ribbon
- Philippine Defense Medal & Ribbon
- Distinguished Unit Badge without Oak-leaf Cluster
