= William P. Morse =

American Army officer

- Born: 24 June 1889; Brainerd, Minnesota
- Died: 20 December 1975 (aged 86); Los Angeles County, California
- Military career
- Branch: Montana National Guard; United States Army
- Service years: 1908–1949
- Rank: Colonel
- Commands: 102nd Division (Philippines)
- Conflicts: World War I; World War II
- Awards: Silver Star Medal (2); Legion of Merit; Bronze Star Medal; Purple Heart

William Pitt Morse (24 June 1889 – 20 December 1975) was a United States Army officer. During World War II, he commanded the 102nd Division during the Philippines campaign and then spent more than three years as a prisoner of war after being ordered to surrender in May 1942.

== Early life and education ==
Morse was born in Brainerd, Minnesota and later moved to Montana. He graduated from the Command and General Staff School in 1928 and the Army War College in 1939.

== Military career ==
Morse enlisted in the Montana National Guard in October 1908. He was commissioned as a second lieutenant of infantry in January 1912. Morse and his wife Margaret lived in Miles City, Montana.

Promoted to captain, Morse was called to active federal service in August 1917. He was initially assigned to the 163rd Infantry, 41st Division. In December 1917, Morse was transferred to the 16th Infantry, 1st Division. Sent to France, he was transferred to the 26th Infantry in May 1918. Two weeks later, Morse was wounded at Cantigny. He was awarded the Silver Star and Purple Heart for his World War I service.

Morse became a captain in the Regular Army infantry in October 1920. He was promoted to major in July 1931 and lieutenant colonel in November 1939.

Sent to the Philippines in November 1941, Morse received a temporary promotion to colonel after the outbreak of hostilities with Japan in December. Assigned to the defense of the southern Philippines, he was given command of the 102nd Division. After surrendering to Japanese forces, Morse was interned with other senior U.S. Army officers on Formosa and in Manchukuo. He was awarded a second Silver Star Medal, the Legion of Merit and the Bronze Star Medal for his World War II service.

After the war, Morse was assigned to ROTC instruction in southern California. His wartime promotion to colonel was made permanent in April 1947. He retired from active duty on 30 June 1949.

== Later life ==
By the 1940s, his wife Margaret was living in the Los Angeles, California area, in Hollywood and North Hollywood. In 1975, Morse died in Los Angeles County at age 86.
