= Camp Kasisang =

Philippines prisoner of war camp in 1942

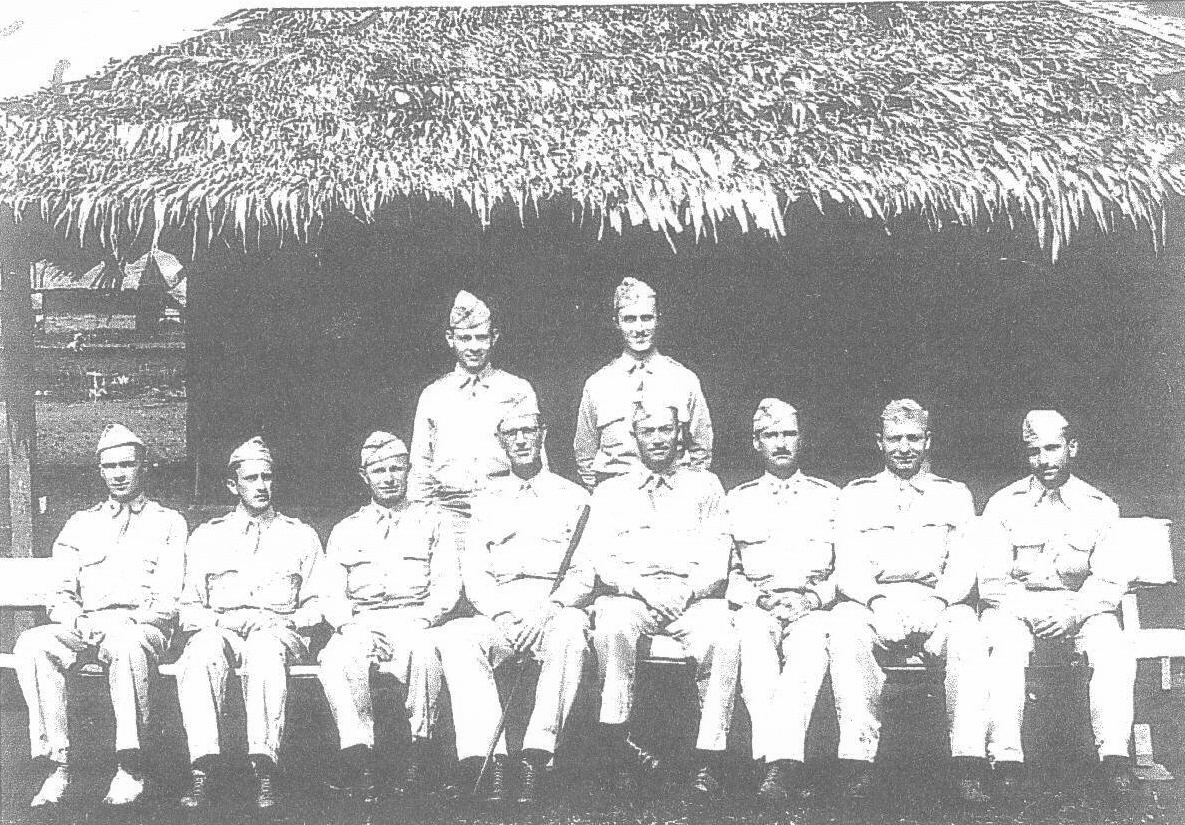
- 1942 photo of US soldiers at Camp Kasisang
- Interactive map of Camp Kasisang
- Location: Malaybalay, Bukidnon, Philippines; 8°09′23″N 125°08′00″E
- Status: Defunct
- Opened: mid-1942
- Closed: October 1942
- Managed by: Empire of Japan

Camp Kasisang, was established as a camp for American and Filipino prisoners of war on 1942, in then municipality of Malaybalay, Bukidnon in the Philippines. Before serving as Mindanao's first camp for prisoners of war, it was a training ground for the Philippine Army. It was located in the foothills of the Malaybalay Mountains and a few miles north of Barangay Casisang.

== History ==
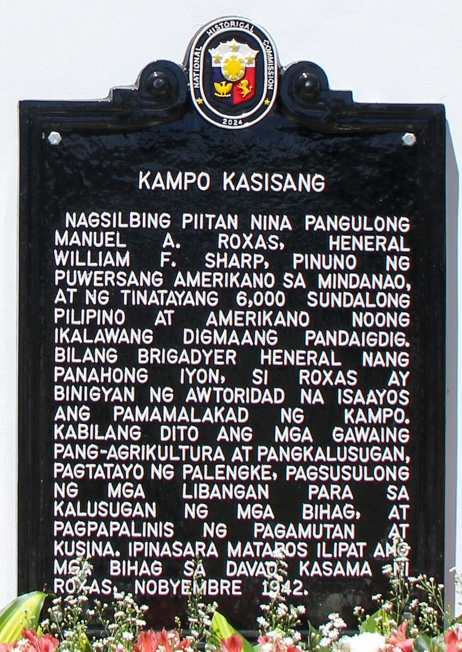
National Historical Commission of the Philippines marker installed in the city in 2024

The camp's barracks were of crude construction, some with corrugated steel roofs but most were made of either thatched wood or nipa palm fronds.

Water was scarce and the prisoners were limited to one water canteen per day for all purposes. One pump was the sole source of water for about 1,000 Americans and 11,000 Filipinos.

=== Movements of prisoners ===
In July 1942, Filipino and American soldiers in Mindanao who surrendered to the Japanese forces were made to march from Camp Keithley in Marawi to Iligan, a distance of about 36 kilometers, to gather them all at Camp Kasisang with the rest of the prisoners of war.

In the succeeding months of 1942, the Japanese transported several prisoners to other parts of the Philippines, including Manila and Davao. The camp was ordered to be closed in November 1942.

=== Deaths ===
Prisoners who were caught making an attempt to escape from the camp were killed. It was report that only 19 prisoners died at Camp Kasisang as a result of the wounds they had before they arrived at the camp, and there were no deaths due to malnutrition or disease.

== Notable prisoners ==
- Manuel A. Roxas - Philippine Army officer who became the president of the Philippines in 1946
- William F. Sharp - US army major general Commander of Mindanao Force.
- Hiram Tarkington - US army colonel, POW and author
- Joseph Vachon - US army brigadier general, commander of 101st Division of the Philippine Army.
- Gumbay Piang - became guerilla commander the rest of the war and became congressman and governor of Cotabato Province after the war.

== Commemoration ==
The Philippines Historical Committee (now the National Historical Commission of the Philippines) declared the camp as a National Historical Landmark in 1948.
