= 62nd Infantry Regiment (PA) =

- Active: August 28, 1941 – May 12, 1942
- Disbanded: May 12, 1942
- Countries: United States of America; Philippine Commonwealth
- Allegiance: United States Army; Philippine Commonwealth Army
- Branch: Army
- Type: Infantry
- Role: Army Reserve
- Size: 2,000
- Part of: 102nd Infantry Division 81st Infantry Division 61st Infantry Division
- Garrison/HQ: Tankulan, Bukidnon; Camp Buloa, Cagayan de Oro; Camp Overton, Lanao; Camp Cabatuan, Iloilo
- Equipment: M1917 Enfield .30 Caliber Bolt Action Rifles, M1914 Lewis Light Machineguns, M1917 Browning .30 Caliber Machineguns, M2 Browning .50 Caliber Heavy Machineguns, 3inch Stokes Mortar
- Engagements: Battle of Dalirig Battle of Magima Canyon Battle of Tagoloan

Commanders
- Notable commanders: Lieutenant Colonel Allen Thayer

Insignia
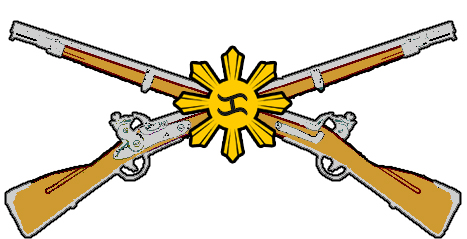
- Identification symbol

62nd Infantry Regiment was Philippine Army Reserve unit activated in November 1941 in Panay Island. It was organized from the Army reservist in that area with officers mostly coming from Luzon and Americans. I was based and trained in Cabatuan, Iloilo and was placed as part of 61st Infantry Division activated on November 1, 1941, in preparation for Japanese invasion of the Philippines.

The regiment was transferred and fought in Cagayan sector in Mindanao island until its surrender on May 12, 1942. It was commanded by US Army officer Lieutenant Colonel Allen Thayer.

== Background ==
The regiment was activated on August 28, 1941, and inducted to USAFFE on September 1, 1941, in Camp Delgado, Iloilo. Lieutenant Colonel Allen Thayer arrived in Panay island along with other commanders in late November 1941 just days before the hostilities started. The regiment has the same problem with other units with old M1917 Rifles with broken extractors, lack of ammunition that soldiers are not allowed to fire their weapons during training to conserve ammunition, lack of training, and communication equipment.

=== Leadership and Staffs ===
Lieutenant Colonel Allen Thayer a WestPoint graduate in 1928 became commanding officer of the regiment in November 1941.

Captain Reed L. McCartney, CO 1st Battalion, Captain Harry J. Skinner, CO 2nd Battalion

=== Transfer to Mindanao ===
On January 3, 1942, the regiment received an order that came from Visayas-Mindanao Force Headquarters from Cebu to transfer to Mindanao. Along with 61st Infantry Regiment and 61st Field Artillery Regiment they took inter-island ferry to Pulupandan, Negros Occidental and took motor transports to down to southern port of Dumaguete, Negros Oriental. The transfer was made in secrecy that Colonel Thayer only knew his destination upon loading of the regiment to a boat. The regiment landed the following day in Iligan in Lanao province. Initially they were attached to Brigadier General Guy Fort's 81st Infantry Division and was assigned on Iligan area to defend.

=== Transfer to Cagayan Sector ===
In February 1942, orders came from General Sharp for the regiment to transfer to Cagayan sector. The regiment was on half ration ever since due to food supply was missing when the cross to Negros island. From Lanao they marched through trail until they reached Lake Pinamaloy in Bukidnon. After few days rest they were moved to Cagayan Sector to defend west of Macajalar bay along Cugman River. In March 1942 after General MacArthur's stopover in Mindanao a new division was organized to command all forces in the Cagayan sector as part of a reorganization of USAFFE.

=== Japanese landing in Macajalar Bay ===
On April 28, 1942, Kawamura detachment landed in two locations of Macajalar Bay. Tagoloan which was attacked by 103rd Infantry Regiment under Major Webb and in Cagayan River which 62nd Infantry assigned to defend it. Colonel Thayer's men was not able to stop the Japanese landing in their area and after few hours they were forced to withdraw towards Puerto and Tankulan to cover the retreat of 61st Field Artillery and 103rd Infantry and setup the new line of defense in Bukidnon.

== First Battle of Mangima Canyon ==
On orders from General Sharp 62nd, 93rd Infantry Regiment, and Artillery Detachment established their new line of defense along Mangima Canyon, a natural barrier that Sayre Highway to the south and then east. Japanese moved forward towards Sayre Highway with armored vehicles, artillery fire support, and air support overcame the defenders in Mangima. 62nd along with 93rd Infantry Regiment under Major Goldtrap and Major Philips Artillery detachment was again in retreat in fear of being cutoff. Sector and 102nd Division commander Colonel Morse ordered Thayer to setup defensive position farther south in Dalirig.

=== Surrender ===
On May 10, 1942, an order from sector and division commander Colonel William P. Morse received by Lieutenant Colonel Thayer to surrender his regiment at daybreak the following day. 62nd Infantry was in Somilao sector when it surrendered to the Japanese. Three American officers, seven Filipino officers, and 166 Filipino enlisted men from the 62nd Infantry surrendered.
