= 61st Infantry Regiment (Philippines) =

Philippine army unit

- Active: August 1941 – May 1942
- Disbanded: May 6, 1942
- Countries: United States of America; Philippine Commonwealth
- Branch: Army
- Type: Infantry
- Role: Ready Reserve
- Size: 1,800
- Part of: 81st Infantry Division; 61st Infantry Division
- Garrison/HQ: Camp Vicars, Bayang, Lanao; La Castellana, Negros Occidental
- Equipment: M1917 Enfield .30 Caliber Bolt Action Rifles; M1917 Browning .30 Caliber Machinegun; 3inch Stokes mortar
- Engagements: Battle of Malabang; Battle of Ganassi; Battle of Dansalan

Commanders
- Notable commanders: Lieutenant Colonel Alejandro Suarez Lieutenant Colonel Calixto Duque; Colonel Eugene H. Mitchell; Major Ernest R. McLish Captain Floyd Forte

Insignia
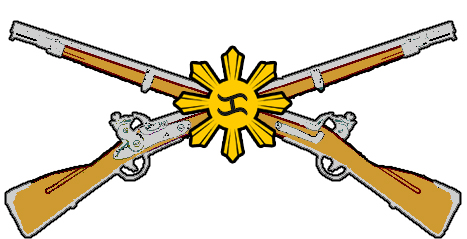
- Identification symbol

61st Infantry Regiment was a military unit and formation of the Philippine Army, activated in August 1941 in Panay Island. It is under the command of 61st Infantry Division. The regiment collapsed in May 1942 with its commanding officer captured by the Japanese Army in Lanao.

== Background ==
In the preparation for the defense of Philippine Islands in late 1941, the 10 reserve divisions were activated. In August all First Infantry Regiment of each division was activated and cadres were called in. Among them is the 61st which activated in Panay island and later moved to Negros Island in October 1941. Captain Floyd Forte was initially its commander during its activation and Captain William S. Van Nostrand as his executive officer, later Major Carter McClennan took over during its expansion. He was replaced to command by Lieutenant Colonel Eugene Mitchell who was sent to Panay island from Manila and was appointed as commander in November 1941, he proceeded to Negros to take command and continue the training of the regiment.

Major Richard Hill replaced Major Van Nostrand as executive officer as he was transferred to Agusan sector, other officers were appointed to fill the regimental staffs, Filipino Captain Legaspi as adjutant and S1, S2 1Lieutenant Dominado regimental operations officer S3, Supply Officer. Captain Harry Katz and Lieutenant Donald Hanning was absorbed as regimental staffs. Cmdr. Robert Cowan Strong Jr., USN assigned as communication officer of the regiment before being appointed as executive officer of 73rd Infantry Regiment.

Three American officers – Captains John Moran, Edward Childress, and Ernest McLish are appointed as battalion commanders of 1st, 2nd and 3rd respectively. HQ Battalion is under Captain Katz, they were in charge of the further training of these battalions and their soldiers.

After 71st Infantry Division was transferred to Luzon leaving only the 73rd Infantry Regiment in Negros Island. 61st Infantry Regiment was ordered to transfer to Negros Island. Stationed at La Castellaña in Negros Occidental. Colonel Eugene T. Mitchell followed after a brief stay in Panay.

== Transfer to Mindanao ==
In January 1942, the division commander General Bradford Chynoweth received transfer order of 61st and 62nd Infantry, and 61st Field Artillery Regiment to Mindanao. 61st Infantry landed in Iligan on the northwest coast of Lanao. They were placed under the operational command of 81st Infantry Division commanded by Brigadier General Guy O. Fort and also concurrent commander of Lanao Sector of the Mindanao Force. The regiment was moved to Malabang to guard Polloc Harbor, to meet any Japanese invasion in this sector. There was no Japanese activities in the sector until late April 1942 and regiment was on continuous training and guarding vital installations around Dansalan. In February regiment was assigned to guard and escort a very important dignitaries. President Manual L. Quezon together with his family and cabinets came in from the Visayas. Several days Vice President Sergio Osmeña followed and together both dignitaries proceeded to Bukidnon to fly to Australia.

=== Combat narratives ===
In April 1942, Zamboanga sector commander reported an invasion force consisting of 6 transports and escorted by 2 destroyers are on the way to western coast toward Cotabato and Polloc Harbor. All units are alerted and put in high alert, 61st Infantry Regiment along with 102nd Infantry Regiment guarding Cotabato City, 2nd Infantry Regiment in Parang, Cotabato put their men in prepared positions. Colonel Mitchell moved his 1st Battalion under Major John Moran to Malabang, 2nd Battalion to Ganassi area and 3rd Battalion was in reserve in Dansalan.

=== Japanese landing ===
Kawaguchi detachment landed in Cotabato City, Parang in Cotabato Province on April 29, 1942 and reached Malabang town in Lanao in April 30. After a secured a beachhead they routed 1st Battalion 61st Infantry under Major Moran started moving north to Dansalan. Japanese forces met a serious resistance in Malating River where a battalion of 61st Infantry under Major Ernest R. McLish threw them back five times before they effected a crossing. Their objective is to move north to link with Kawamura detachment in Cagayan sector. With reinforced regiment of 3,000 with artillery, tanks, and air bombers, Colonel Mitchell and his 61st Infantry Regiment was not able to put up a resistance that would delay the Japanese. Except for few ambushes and night small attack his troops could not stop their advanced. Captain Harry Harding took over the command of 2nd Battalion when Major Childress was reportedly killed and missing after the fight near Malabang.

=== Disintegration ===
In Pualas, Colonel Mitchell was captured by recon force of the advancing Japanese thus removing leadership of the regiment. His troops dispersed towards to mountains and others where straggled and joined 73rd Infantry Regiment in Ganassi. General Fort appointed Lieutenant Colonel Calixto Duque former commander of dispersed 2nd Infantry Regiment in Parang, Cotabato to assumed command of the regiment. Remnants, stragglers, and PC are now being organized to fill the personnel of the regiment. On May 11, 1942, when orders to surrender was sent, the regiment became POWs but some went to the mountains and started organizing as guerilla force.

=== Post War ===
After the liberation of Mindanao and Sulu Archipelago from Japanese occupation. Guerillas from Sulu Area Command, Zamboanga Peninsula, and Misamis was merged into a single unit, 61st Infantry Regiment was shortly reactivated and appointed Lieutenant Colonel Alejandro Suarez as its commander. He established his headquarters in Pasonanca, Zamboanga City in September 1945. The regiment was deactivated but 61st Infantry (Hunters) Battalion based in Miagao, Iloilo was activated in 1980 under 3rd Infantry Division to combat communist NPA in the Panay Island.

== American members ==
- Ernest McLish – Captain, refused to surrender and went to hills, commanded 107th Division (Guerilla) 1942 to 1945.
- Clyde Childress – Captain, refused to surrender and went the mountains, commanded 108th Division (Guerilla) 1942 to 1945.
- Richard Hill - Major, regimental executive officer.
- William Van Norstrand - Lieutenant Colonel, transferred to Agusan sector to command 81st Infantry Regiment
- Eugene T. Mitchell - Colonel, regimental commander.
- John Moran - Captain, CO 1st Battalion
- Albert Price - Captain, Field Artillery Commander/Observer
- Robert Strong Jr. - US Navy Commander, Communication Officer of the regiment but appointed by Colonel Vesey to be his executive officer to replace Major Tisdale.

== See also ==
- 61st Infantry Division (Philippines)
- 81st Infantry Division (Philippines)
- Guy O. Fort
- Japanese invasion of Malabang (1942)
