= 61st Division (Philippines) =

61st Infantry Division (PA)
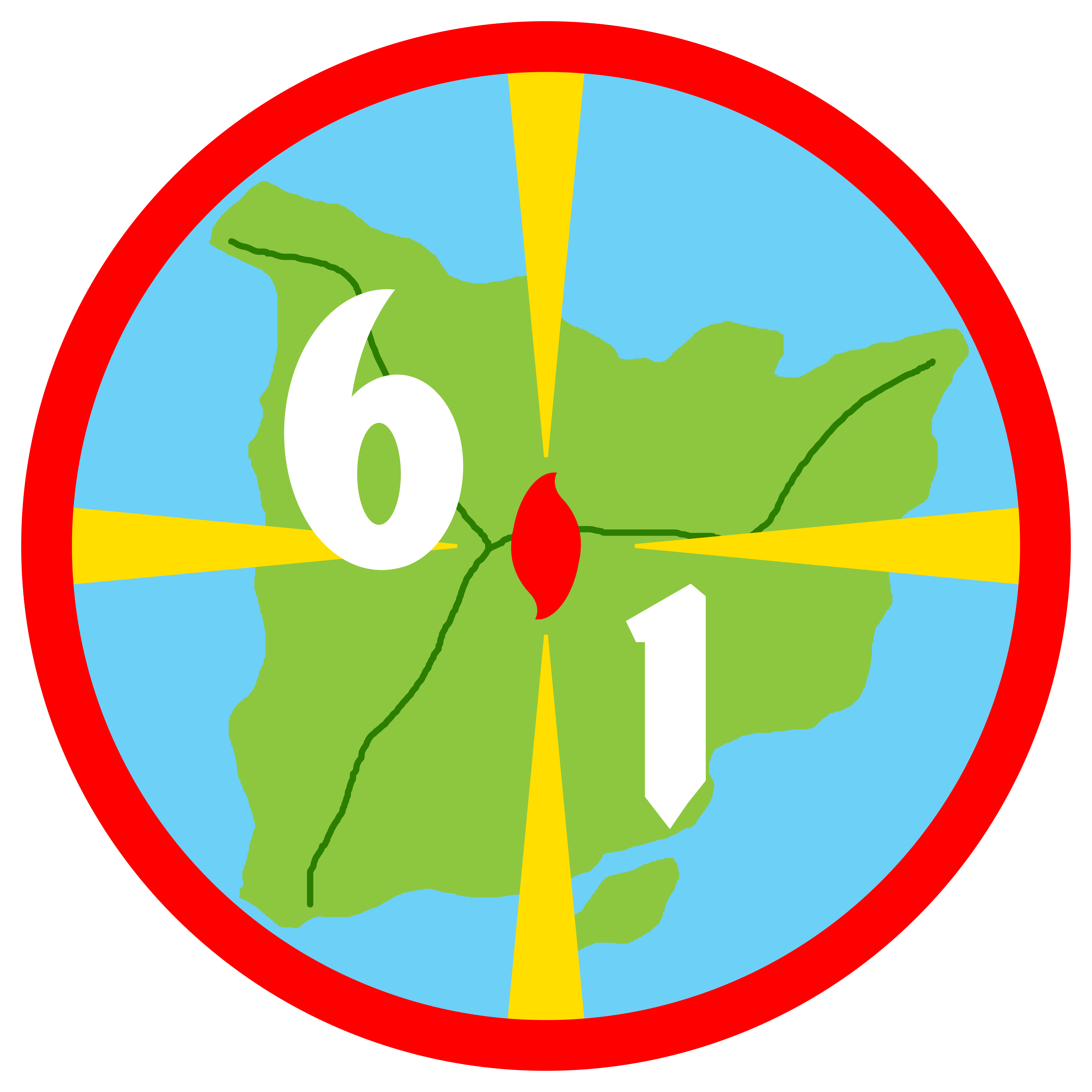
- 61st Philippine Division Emblem 1941-42
- Active: 1941-1942
- Disbanded: May 9, 1942
- Countries: United States of America (Philippines) Philippine Commonwealth
- Allegiance: United States Army; Philippine Commonwealth Army
- Branch: Army
- Type: Infantry Division
- Role: Territorial Defense
- Size: 8,000
- Part of: Visayan Force; Visayas-Mindanao Force
- Garrison/HQ: Sara, Iloilo; Fort San Pedro, Iloilo City
- Equipment: M1911 Colt 45 Caliber Pistols M1917 Enfield .30 Caliber Bolt Action Rifles; M1918 Browning Automatic Rifles M1923 Thompson Submachineguns M1917 Browning Machineguns TNT Charges Filipino Bolo
- Engagements: World War II: Philippines campaign (1941–1942); Japanese Invasion of Panay
- Decorations: Philippine Presidential Unit Citation; Philippine Defense Campaign Medal

Commanders
- Chief of Staff: (United States) LCol. Franklin Fliniau (United States) Col. Albert Christie (Philippines) LCol. Juan Quimbo
- General Staffs: G1 Personnel LCol Quidl G2 Intelligence LCol Nicolas Velardo; LCol Tomas Cabili; G3 Operations LCol Macario Peralta G4 Supply LCol Robert Britten
- Special Staffs: Provost Marshal LCol Juan Quimbo
- Notable commanders: (United States) Col. (later BGen.) Bradford G. Chynoweth (United States) Colonel (Later BGen.)Albert F. Christie

Insignia
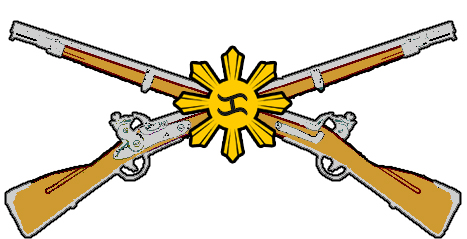
- Identification symbol

The 61st Division of the Philippine Army was an infantry division from the 1941 to 1942.

In late 1941, there were two regular and ten reserve divisions in the Army of the Philippines, with about 100,000 to 300,000 active troops and officers in the general headquarters, camps in Manila and across the provinces of the Philippines. Among them were the Visayas-Mindanao Force under Colonel (Later MGen.) William F. Sharp in the southern islands (61st, 81st, and 101st Infantry Divisions plus three other infantry regiments), and the Reserve Force.

== Background ==
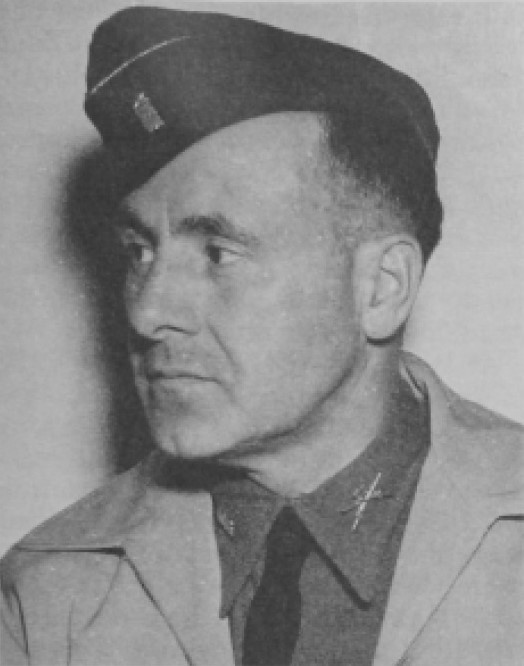
Col (Later BGen.) Bradford Chynoweth was the commander of 61st Infantry Division (PA) before moving to command Visayan Force.

61st Infantry Division was activated in November 1941, then Colonel Bradford Chynoweth was appointed as its commander. He arrived in Panay Island on late November few days before hostilities started. He selected as his division chief of staff was 63rd Infantry Regiment commander Col. Albert F. Christie, replacing Lieutenant Colonel Juan Quimbo who was appointed as Provost Marshal. In addition to division staffs Captain Macario Peralta as G3 Operations. Captain Britton became the G4 Supply.

Major Dwight Deter as Division Surgeon; Captain Thomas Powell Jr as Division Engineer, he was replaced Major Claude Fertig when he was ordered transferred to Cebu.

Regimental Commanders; are Colonel Eugene Mitchell for 61st Infantry, Lieutenant Colonel Allen Thayer for 62nd Infantry, Carter McClennan who replaced Christie at 63rd Infantry, he was replaced by Lieutenant Colonel Lyle Fritzpatrick when he was ordered to Negros Island to command, and Lieutenant Colonel Hiram Tarkington, 61st Field Artillery Regiment.

Two Infantry regiments was organized in February 1942 after three regiments was ordered to Mindanao. 64th Infantry Regiment and 65th Infantry Regiment where these units were renamed as 61st Provisional Infantry Regiment and 62nd Provisional Infantry Regiment respectively.

=== Command changes ===
In March 1942 BGen. Chynoweth moved to Cebu to command the newly created Visayan Force and Col. Christie took over the command of 61st Division and promoted to brigadier general temporarily. Lieutenant Colonel Franklin Flininau took over as division chief of staff. The division primarily organized as infantry as 61st FA did not receive its 75mm guns, which sank with SS Corregidor in Manila Bay. It has limited weapons and ammunitions, no antiaircraft guns and antitank guns.

== Preparations ==
With only 63rd Infantry Regiment left in Panay Island as 61st, 62nd Infantry Regiments and 61st Field Artillery Regiment that were transferred to augment the Mindanao Force, 64th and 65th Provisional Infantry Regiments were activated under the commands of Lieutenant Colonel Juan Quimbo and Lieutenant Colonel James Bickerton respectively. Col. Christie continued the preparations of the defense of the island until mid of April.

== Order of battle November 1941 to January 1942 ==
- 61st Infantry Regiment (PA) (LCol. Eugene T. Mitchell, Inf.) (transferred to Mindanao attached to 81st ID)
- 62nd Infantry Regiment (PA) (LCol. Allen Thayer) (transf. to 102nd Division (PA) in Mindanao)
- 63rd Infantry Regiment (Col. Albert Christie | LCol. Carter McLennan)
- 61st Field Artillery Regiment (PA) (Col. Hiram W. Tarkington, FA) (transf. Mindanao Force Reserve)
  - 61st FA Regt HQ Company
  - 1st Bn/61st FA Regt (PA) (75mm guns, 8x)
  - 2nd Bn/61st FA Regt (PA) (2.95-inch pack howitzers, 12x)
  - 3rd Bn/61st FA Regt (PA)
- 61st Engineer Battalion (PA) - Major Claude Fertig | Maj. Thomas Powell Jr| LCol. Leopoldo Relunia
- 61st Medical Battalion - Major Dwight Deter
- 61st Division Units
  - 61st Division Headquarters & HQ Company
  - 61st Medical Battalion
  - 61st Signal Company
  - 61st Quartermaster Company (Motorized)
  - 61st QM Transport Company (Truck)

== Japanese landings ==
Kawamura Detachment of IJA 5th Division with naval escorts and air support landed in Panay on April 16, 1942 on 3 landing sites. Main force landed in west coast of Iloilo, small force in Capiz, and another detachment in Hamtic town in Antique province.

=== Combat actions ===
General Christie didn't offer any resistance in the beach on all these landings and ordered his forces to move inland. But before leaving they destroyed bridges and burned Iloilo business district. 1st Battalion, 63rd Infantry under Capt. Julian Chaves attack Japanese detachment Mt. Dila-Dila near Calinog town. Japanese withdraw and didn't pursue Capt Chaves troops.

=== Surrender ===
Upon receiving orders from MGen. Sharp and LGen Wainwright to surrender, Col. Christie surrendered Panay Force and 61st Infantry Division so as BGen. Chynoweth as overall commander of Visayan Force. These officers and others went into captivity after the Corregidor surrender; Gen. Chynoweth survived three and a half years of horrible conditions as a prisoner of war.

=== Guerrilla warfare ===
The resistance movement on Panay was unique. It developed rapidly; there was a minimum of discord; and a dynamic leader emerged at an early time. The guerrilla structure on Panay was built around a core of refugee troops of the Philippine 61st Division who had taken to the hills immediately after the surrender orders were published. Scarcely ten weeks after the Japanese invasion, Colonel Macario Peralta, Jr., former G-3 of the division and a man of strong and driving character, assumed undisputed control of the main guerrilla groups. The early emergence of a generally accepted leader and the availability of a relatively large amount of salvaged supplies and equipment gave a powerful impetus to the formation of a smoothly working guerrilla command.

The first reactivated Philippine military district commanders were appointed in February 1943. LCol. Peralta was given command of the 6th Military District on Panay. He already exercised considerable influence over adjacent islands, and thus was given temporary control over the 7th and 8th Districts of Negros and Cebu. The small guerrilla bands on Masbate, Marinduque, Mindoro, and Palawan, having no outstanding leaders of their own, remained under the domination of the 6th Military District. Colonel Peralta soon developed one of the most extensive and efficient intelligence systems in the Philippines.

== Order of Battle March to May 1942 (Panay Force) ==
- 63rd Infantry Regiment (PA) - Col. Lyle Fritzpatrick | Col. Richard Kenney| LCol. Leopoldo Relunia
- 64th Provisional Infantry Regiment (PA) - LCol. Crispin Gorriceta | LCol. Cesar Hechanova | LCol Lyle Fritzpatrick | LCol. James Bickerton | LCol. Amos Francia
- 65th Provisional Infantry Regiment (PA) - LCol Juan C. Quimbo | LCol. Amos Francia | LCol Grino
- 61st Engineer Battalion (PA) - LCol. Leopoldo Relunia
- 61st Division Units
  - 61st Division Headquarters & HQ Company
  - 61st Medical Battalion
  - 61st Signal Company
  - 61st Quartermaster Company (Motorized)
  - 61st QM Transport Company (Truck)

== Notable soldiers ==
- Macario Peralta - led guerrillas in Panay and became AFP Deputy chief of staff after the war. He was Secretary of National Defense in 1961.
- Tomas Cabili - Later Secretary of Defense, then Senator
- Bradford Chynoweth - Division commander and later Visayan Force commander.
- Albert Christie - Division Chief of Staff and later division commander.
- Hiram Tarkington - Commander of 61st Field Artillery Regiment, saw action in Mindanao.
- Cesar Roces - Supply Officer of 6th Military District.
- Macario Peralta Jr., - Divisional Operations Officer, assumed command of 6th Military District and guerrilla forces in Panay after the surrender of Colonel Christie, became AFP Deputy Chief of Staff after the war and became Secretary of Defense in 1961 to 1964.

=== Sources ===
- Morton, Louis (1953). United States Army in World War II, The War in the Pacific: The Fall of the Philippines. Washington, D.C.: Center of Military History, United States Army.
- Whitman, John W. (1990). Bataan: Our Last Ditch : The Bataan Campaign, 1942. Hippocrene Books. ISBN 0-87052-877-7.

== Bibliography ==
- Morton, Louis. The Fall of the Philippines (Publication 5-2) . Retrieved on 14 Feb 2017.

== See also ==
- Macario Peralta Jr.
- Ludovico Arroyo Bañas
- Visayas-Mindanao Force
- Visayan Force
- Bradford G. Chynoweth
- Kawamura Detachment
- 61st Infantry Regiment
- 62nd Infantry Regiment
- 63rd Infantry Regiment
- 61st Field Artillery Regiment
