= Macario Peralta Jr. =

Filipino soldier, lawyer, senator and Secretary of National Defense

The Honorable Macario P. Peralta Jr.
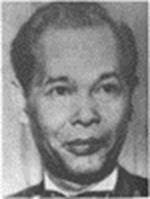
- Macario Peralta Jr. as Defense Secretary in 1962

Secretary of National Defense
- In office January 1, 1962 – December 30, 1965
- President: Diosdado Macapagal
- Preceded by: Alejo Santos
- Succeeded by: Ferdinand Marcos (acting)

Senator of the Philippines
- In office December 30, 1949 – December 30, 1955

Chairman of the Philippine Veterans Board
- In office 1946–1949
- Appointed by: Manuel Roxas

Deputy Chief of Staff, Philippine Army
- In office December 21, 1945 – December 31, 1946
- Preceded by: Vicente Lim
- Succeeded by: Calixto Duque

Personal details
- Born: July 30, 1913 Manila, Philippine Islands
- Died: December 30, 1965 (aged 52) Manila, Philippines
- Resting place: Jaro, Iloilo City, Philippines
- Party: Liberal
- Spouse: Natividad Kasilag
- Children: Macario III; Cecilia; Engelbert
- Education: BS Civil Engineering
- Alma mater: Adamson University
- Profession: Lawyer

Military service
- Allegiance: Philippines
- Army: Philippine Army
- Years of service: 1936–46
- Rank: Brigadier General
- Battles/wars: World War II; Liberation of Panay

Macario Peralta Peralta Jr. (July 30, 1913 – January 7, 1975) was a Filipino soldier, lawyer, senator and Secretary of National Defense.

== Early life ==
Peralta was born in Manila on July 30, 1913, of Ilocano-Pangasinan descent to Macario Maravilla Peralta Sr. and Concepcion Roldan Peralta from Mangatarem, Pangasinan, he grew up in Moncada, Tarlac. Peralta finished his Bachelor of Laws degree at the University of the Philippines Manila, graduating cum laude, in 1936. He passed the bar the same year, obtaining second place to Diosdado Macapagal.

== Career ==
=== Army Officer ===
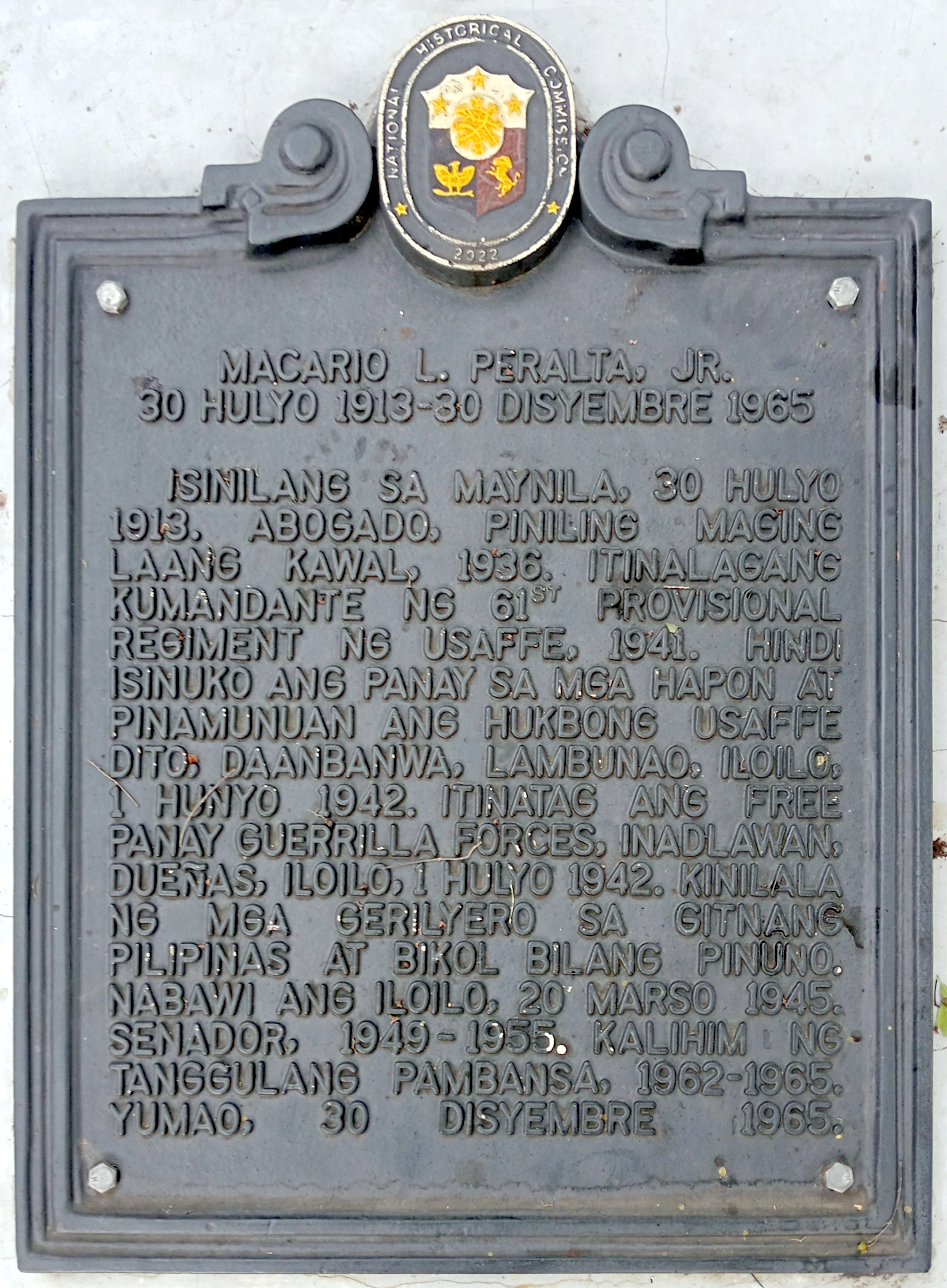
Historical marker installed in Iloilo City in 2023

Peralta joined the Philippine Army in 1936 as a reserve officer and was later commissioned in the regular force as second Lieutenant. His first assignment was in Cebu as Commandant of the Visayan Institute ROTC cadets, later at the Adamson University in Manila. He attended the Philippine Army Infantry School in 1940, finishing at the top of his class.

War found him back in the Visayas as Chief of Operations of the 61st Division, then being mobilized in Iloilo. After the surrender of the USAFFE troops to the Japanese, Peralta, then a Colonel, organized and led the guerrillas in Panay, Romblon, Palawan, Marinduque and portions of Masbate and Mindoro, all in or bordering the Western Visayas. Col. Peralta's guerrilla forces controlled much of Panay when the Americans returned on March 18, 1945.

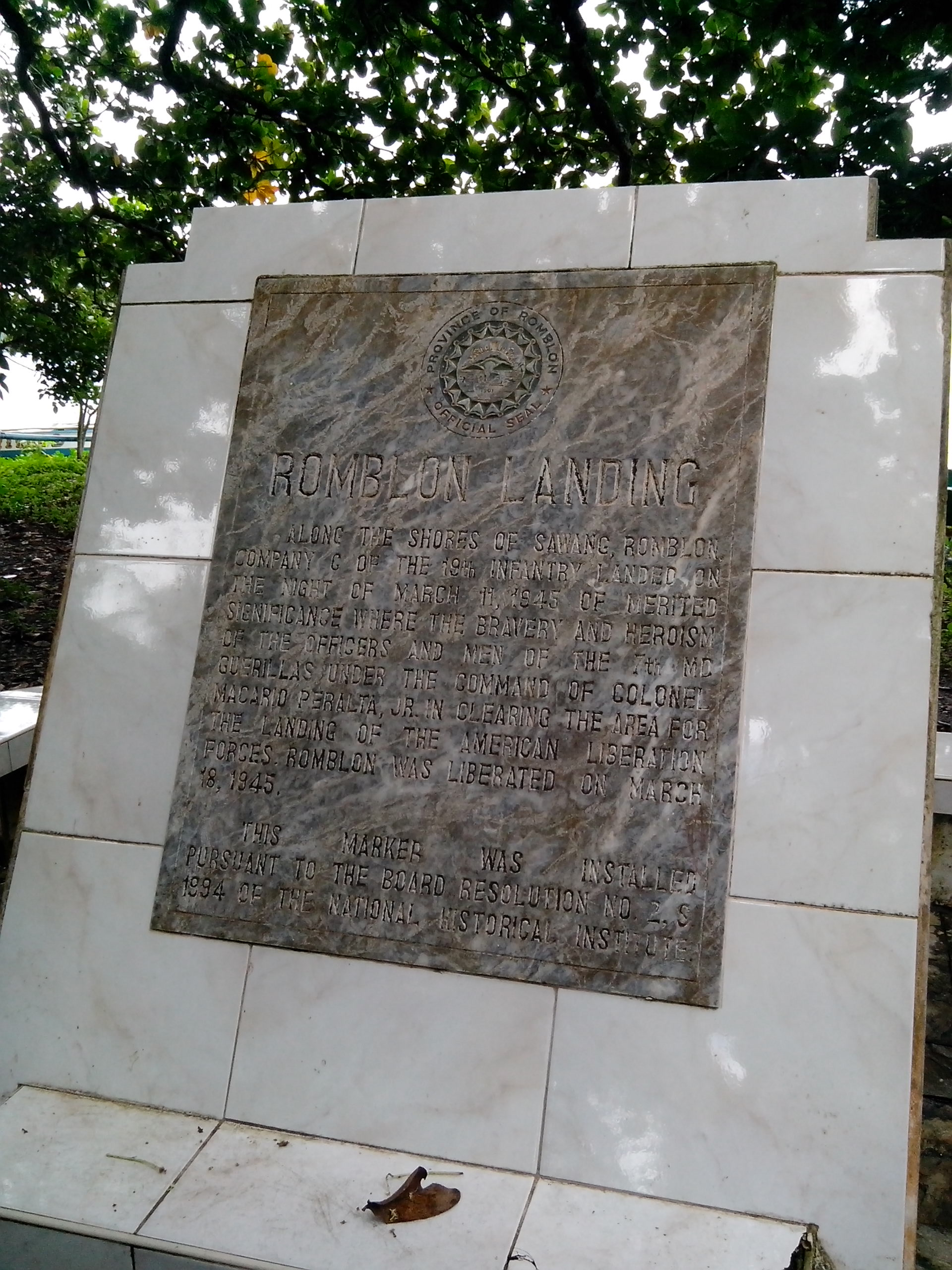
Plaque commemorating the landing of American liberation forces in Sawang, Romblon during World War II, and honoring Colonel Macario Peralta, Jr. and forces under his command.

In this resistance campaign against the Japanese, Peralta displayed his exemplary leadership, competence and gallantry in action. For this he was awarded the Distinguished Service Star. The United States government conferred on him the Distinguished Service Cross and the Silver Star. The Distinguished Service Cross was presented to him on Panay, soon after liberation, as can be seen in this video on YouTube of the Panay landing taken by the Army Pictorial Service.

Returning to military control in 1945, he was subsequently sent to the Command and General Staff College at Fort Leavenworth, Kansas, in the United States for advanced studies. He came home with a special commendation from the commandant of the school for his "brilliant and unexcelled scholastic record". Late in 1945, he was promoted to Brigadier General, and was designated Deputy Chief of Staff of the Philippine Army.

He resigned from the Army in 1946 and was appointed by President Manuel Roxas as Chairman of the Philippine Veterans Board, a position he served until 1949. With the Magsaysay Mission to the United States which he helped organize, he was able to obtain substantial benefits for the disabled veterans. Again, he was awarded the Distinguished Service Star by the Philippine government for this mission.

=== Political career ===
At 36, he ran for the Philippine Senate and was elected in 1949 under the Liberal Party. Among his achievements at the Senate were the expose of the Tambobong-Buenavista estate deal; procurement of supplies and equipment for the Filipino troops in Korea, so called Philippine Expeditionary Forces to Korea (PEFTOK); legislation giving veterans priority in employment and others. In 1955, he was elected as one of the outstanding senators when his Senate term ended, Peralta returned to law practice.

=== Cabinet official ===
It was President Macapagal who persuaded him to handle the defense portfolio, a position he had twice refused after the "exemplary devotion to duty and for being the most valuable cabinet member" in the first year of the Macapagal administration. The President also appointed him head of the Philippine Virginia Tobacco Administration (PVTA).

He was awarded by the Confederation of Filipino Veterans (CONVETS) for distinguished service to Filipino veterans. He was a recipient of the Gold Cross Medal for gallantry in action in Panay.

== Personal life and death ==
Peralta was married to Natividad Kasilag of Batangas with whom he had three children - Macario III, Cecilia, and Engelbert.

He died on December 30, 1965, and is buried at the Balantang Memorial Cemetery National Shrine in Jaro, Iloilo City.

== See also ==
- List of American guerrillas in the Philippines
- 61st Infantry Division, Philippine Commonwealth Army
- Deputy Chief of Staff of the Armed Forces of the Philippines
- Tomás Confesor, leader of civilian government on Panay
