= Macajalar Bay =

Bay in Mindanao, Philippines

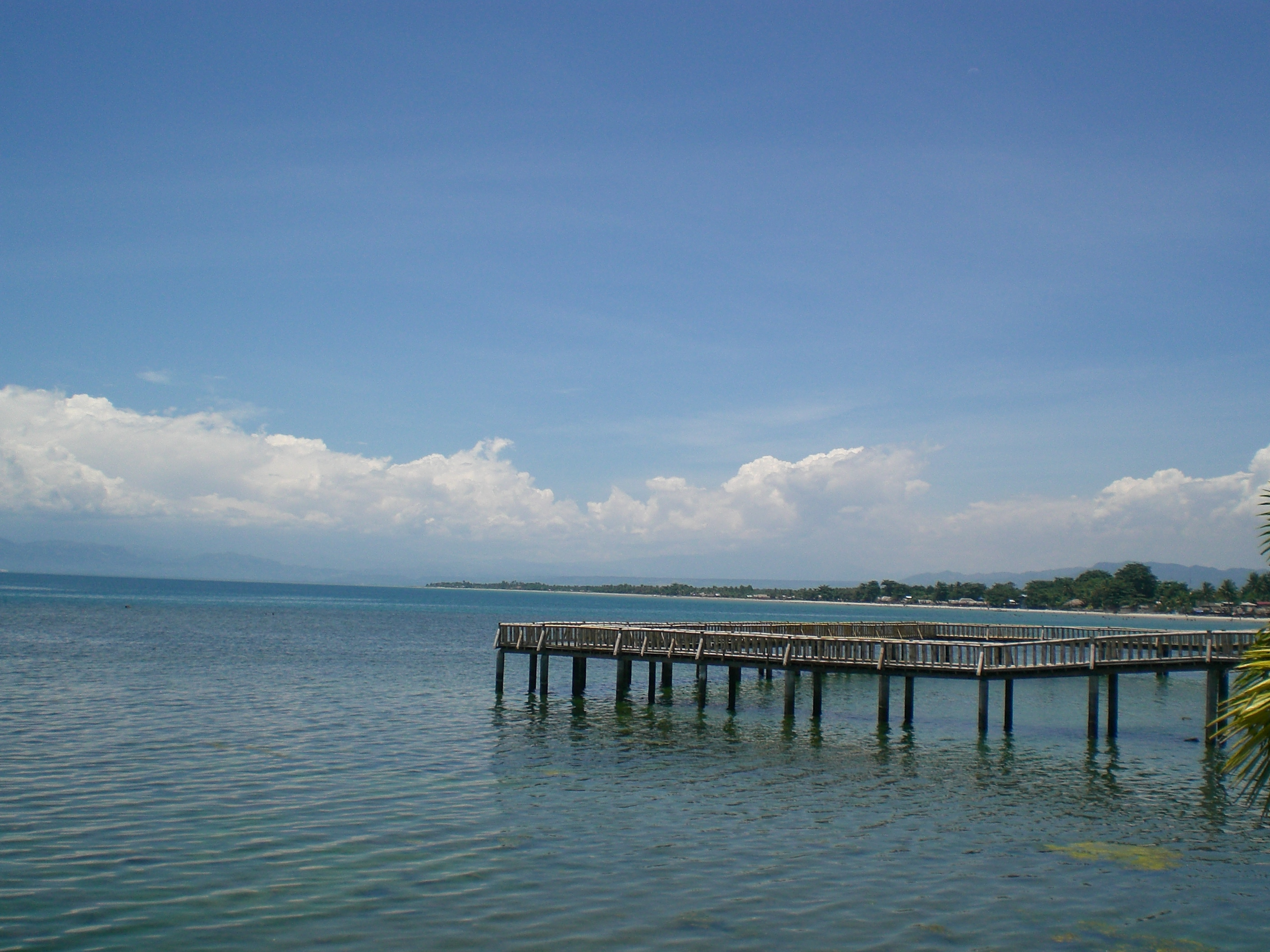
- The bay as viewed from Opol

- Location within the Philippines Macajalar Bay (Philippines)

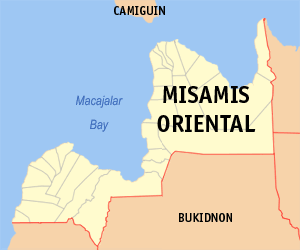
- Location: Misamis Oriental
- Coordinates: 8°35′25.08″N 124°39′12.96″E
- Part of: Bohol Sea
- Settlements: Alubijid; Balingasag; Binuangan; Cagayan de Oro; El Salvador; Jasaan; Lagonglong; Laguindingan; Opol; Salay; Tagoloan; Villanueva

Macajalar Bay is a deep water bay of the Bohol Sea, located north of the province of Misamis Oriental on Mindanao Island, in the southern part of the Philippines. Cagayan de Oro, being the regional center of Northern Mindanao, is located in one of its deep-water harbors. Twelve of the municipalities of Misamis Oriental share a coastline with the bay.

== Environmental degradation ==
Towards the end of the 1980s, the Northern Mindanao region experienced rapid economic growth due to a confluence of factors: infrastructure growth, in-migration due to rising conflict in other parts of Mindanao and increased speculative capital investments due to development plans for establishment of a new Cagayan de Oro-Iligan Industrial Corridor. With these, the environment and livelihoods of local or traditional farming and fishing communities came under massive threat and dis-location.

In the mid-1980s, Northern Mindanao emerged to become one of the three major growth centers in southern Philippines, with Cagayan de Oro as its commercial and industrial hub. The coastal city of Cagayan de Oro, fronting Macajalar Bay, became a major industrial port and an entry point for new migrants and settlers. From a 3rd Class City in the 1970s, Cagayan de Oro's population burgeoned to nearly half of million by the late 1990s. But rapid economic growth also spawned increased land speculation, illegal logging, sea piracy, destructive fishing and mining practices, shipping and industrial pollution.

Today, the presence of many industrial projects in and around Cagayan de Oro, continue to spew large amount of pollutants into the bay.
