= Bradford G. Chynoweth =

American general (1890–1985)

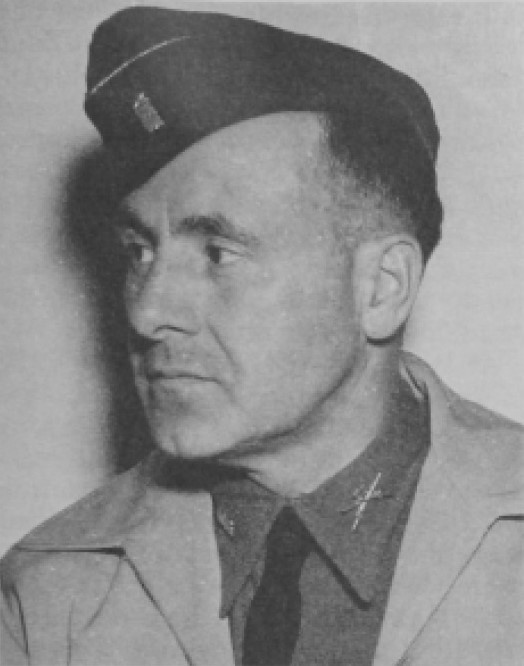
- Nickname: Chen
- Born: July 20, 1890; Cheyenne, Wyoming
- Died: February 8, 1985 (aged 94) San Francisco, California
- Allegiance: United States of America
- Branch: United States Army
- Service years: 1912–1919, 1920–1947
- Rank: Brigadier General
- Commands: Visayan Force; 61st Division (Philippines); 53rd Infantry Regiment; 1st Battalion, 66th Infantry; 3rd Battalion, 6th Infantry
- Conflicts: Mexican Punitive Expedition; World War I; World War II
- Awards: Distinguished Service Medal

Bradford Grethen Chynoweth (July 20, 1890 – February 8, 1985) was a United States Army brigadier general. During World War II, he commanded the 61st Division and Visayan Force during the Philippines campaign and then spent more than three years as a prisoner of war after being ordered to surrender in May 1942.

== Early life and education ==
Chynoweth was born at Fort Russell in Cheyenne, Wyoming, the son of Army officer and 1877 United States Military Academy graduate Edward Chynoweth. After studying at the Georgia Military Academy, he was appointed to the U.S. Military Academy at West Point from Wisconsin. Chynoweth graduated 5th in the Class of June 1912 and was commissioned in the Corps of Engineers. He subsequently graduated from the Army Engineer School in April 1915. Chynoweth later graduated from the Infantry Tank School in June 1921, the Command and General Staff School in July 1928 and the Army War College in July 1932. After retirement, he studied philosophy and religion at the University of California, Berkeley.

== Career ==
After commissioning, Chynoweth served at Washington Barracks from September 1912 to August 1913. He was assigned to Fort Sill in Oklahoma from January to March 1916 and then participated in the Mexican Punitive Expedition from March 1916 to February 1917. Chynoweth was promoted to captain in July 1916.

During World War I, Chynoweth was assigned to the office of the Chief of Engineers in Washington, D.C. from November 1917 to May 1919. He received temporary promotions to major in August 1917 and lieutenant colonel in August 1918, but was never sent overseas. After the war, Chynoweth was transferred to Detroit, Michigan as an assistant to the District Engineer. He was returned to his permanent rank of captain in October 1919 and resigned his commission shortly thereafter.

Chynoweth found work as a mechanical engineer in New York City from November 1919 to May 1920, and then in the Detroit auto industry. Dissatisfied with civilian life, he rejoined the Army as an infantry major in November 1920. A skilled marksman since his days at the Military Academy, Chynoweth was assigned to the Infantry Rifle Team from June to October 1921 and July to October 1922.

From December 1923 to September 1926, Chynoweth was based at Camp Gaillard in the Panama Canal Zone. From December 1926 to August 1927, he was given command of the 3rd Battalion, 6th Infantry at Jefferson Barracks in Missouri. From March to September 1929, Chynoweth served as captain of the Infantry Rifle Team.

Chynoweth was assigned to the War Department operations staff from August 1932 to June 1936. He was promoted to lieutenant colonel in August 1935. From July 1936 to March 1939, Chynoweth served as an instructor with the New Jersey National Guard and the 44th Division. He was then sent to London as part of the War Department intelligence staff from March to September 1939, when the United Kingdom declared war on Germany.

From October 1939 to June 1940, Chynoweth served as commander of the 1st Battalion, 66th Infantry (Light Tanks) at Fort George G. Meade in Maryland and Fort Benning in Georgia. From July 1940 to November 1941, he was given command of the 53rd Infantry Regiment at Fort Ord in California. Chynoweth received a temporary promotion to colonel in June 1941.

In November 1941, Chynoweth was sent to the Philippines as commander of the 61st Division on Panay. He received a temporary promotion to brigadier general in December 1941. Chynoweth prepared the division for defense of the area and also for potential withdrawal into the mountains as a guerrilla force. In March 1942, he was given command of the Visayan Force on Cebu. In April 1942, Japanese forces landed nearby. Chynoweth set up a defensive position on Balamban Mountain, but was ordered to surrender by Generals Wainwright and Sharp in May 1942. He remained a prisoner of war until August 1945.

After the war, Chynoweth was assigned to Army Service Forces headquarters in Washington, D.C. until his October 31, 1947, retirement as a brigadier general. He was awarded the Distinguished Service Medal for his service during the Philippines campaign.

== Personal ==
Chynoweth's father Edward married Emilie Grethen on November 25, 1882, in Minneapolis, Minnesota. They had two daughters and a single son, Bradford. His sisters married Army officers Maj. Gen. George A. Lynch and Col. Horace P. Hobbs.

Promoted to major in December 1902, his father graduated from the Army War College in November 1908 and then commanded a battalion of the 17th Infantry at Camagüey, Cuba from November 1908 to January 1909, when he contracted amoebic dysentery. His father died in July 1909 after an intestinal operation in Atlanta, Georgia.

Chynoweth married Grace Woodruff on December 31, 1920. They had two daughters and a son.

After his 1947 retirement, Chynoweth and his wife moved to Berkeley, California. He died at the Presidio of San Francisco and was interred at Sunset View Cemetery in El Cerrito, California.
