= Banate, Iloilo =

Municipality in Iloilo, Philippines

Banate
- Municipality
- Municipality of Banate
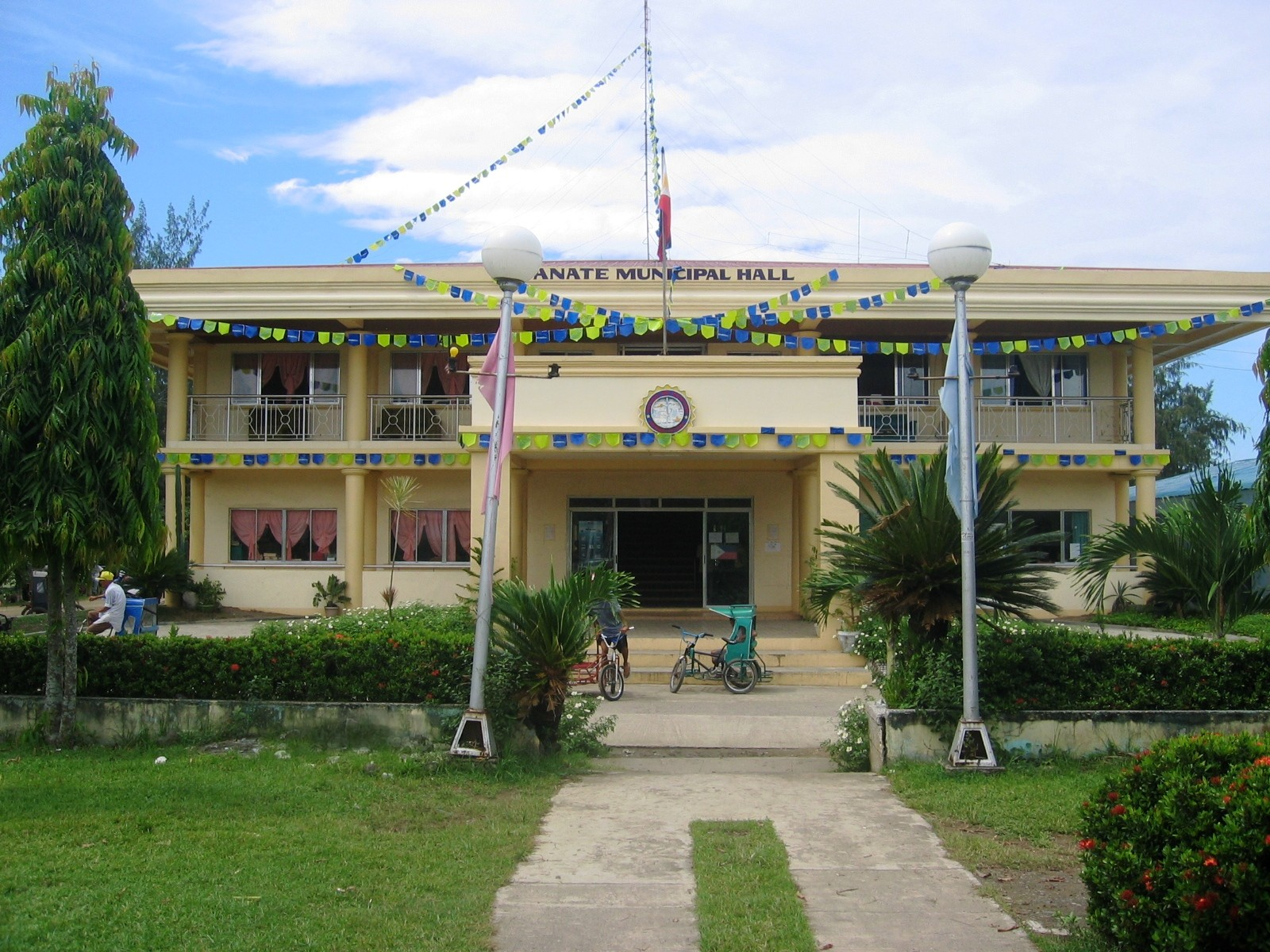
- Banate Municipal Hall

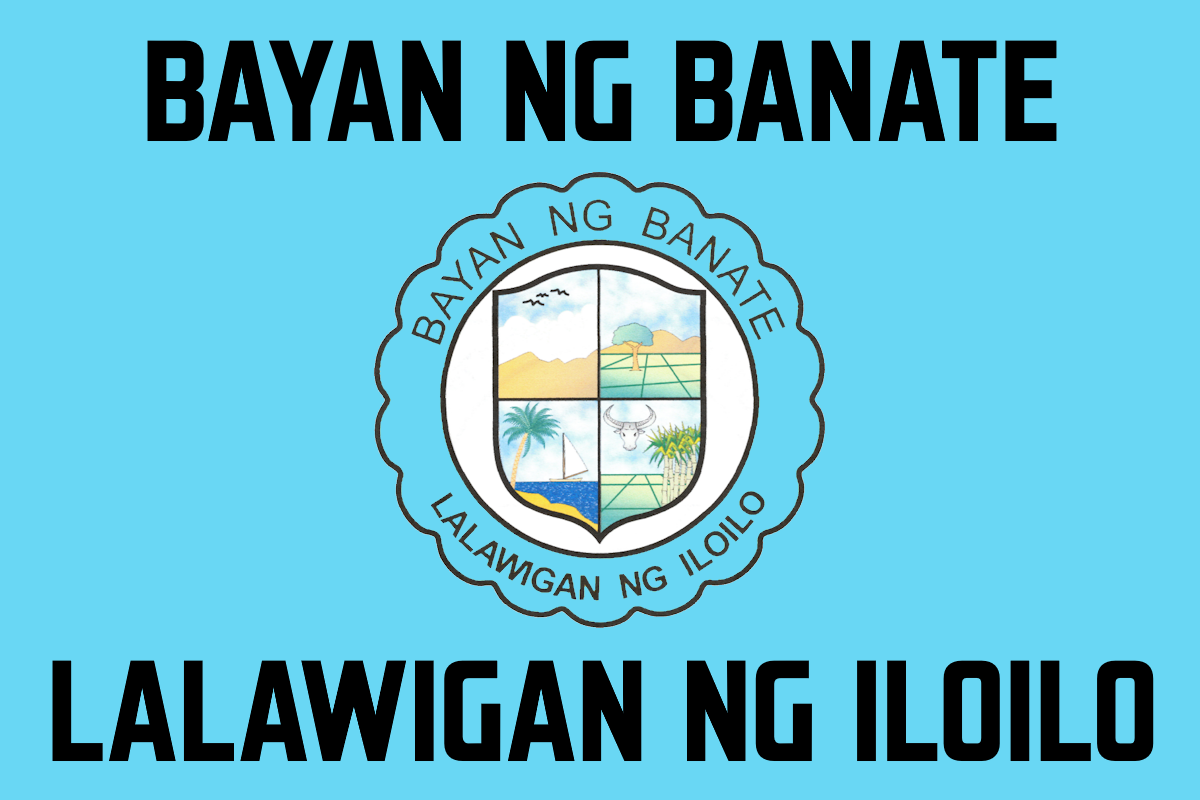
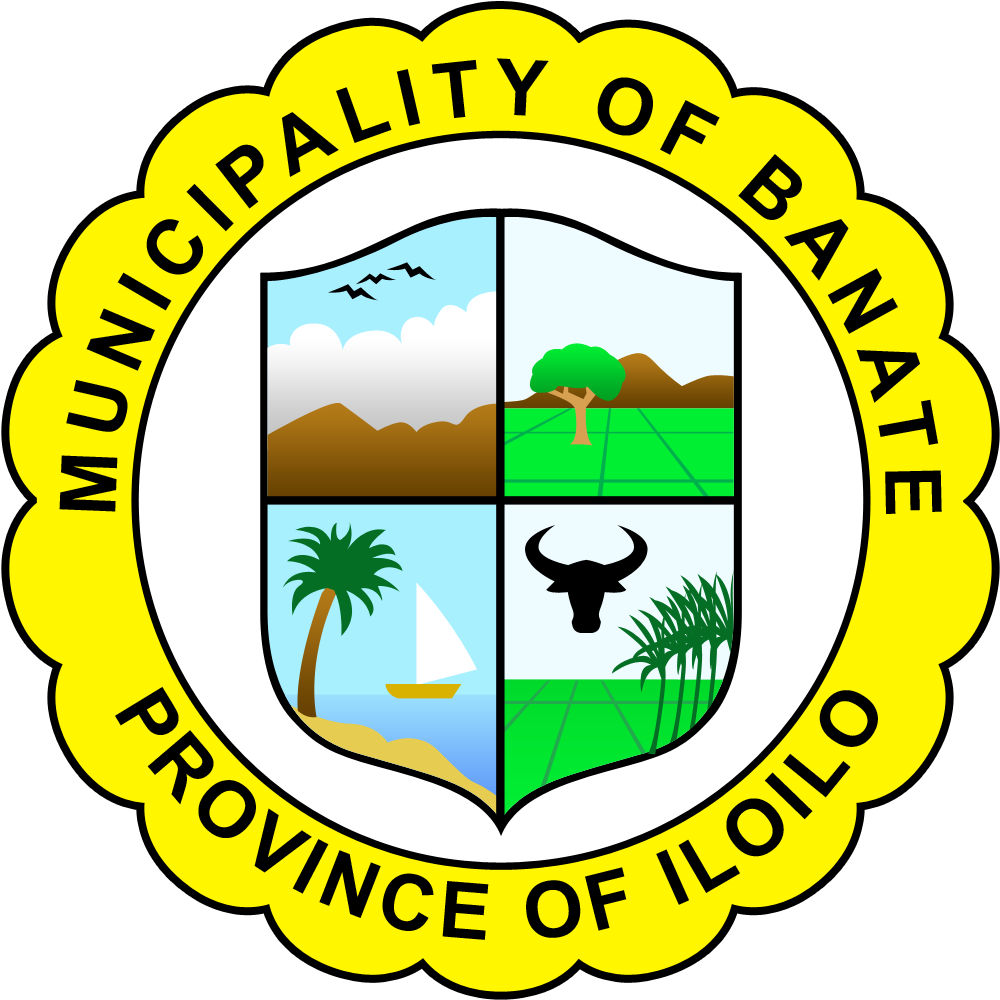
- Flag Seal
- Motto: Abante Banate!
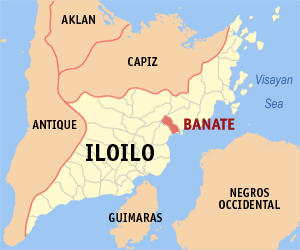
- Map of Iloilo with Banate highlighted
- Interactive map of Banate
- Location within the Philippines
- Coordinates: 11°03′N 122°47′E
- Country: Philippines
- Region: Western Visayas
- Province: Iloilo
- District: 4th district
- Founded: 1763
- Re-established: 1843
- Barangays: 18 (see Barangays)

Government
  - Type: Sangguniang Bayan
  - Mayor: Peter Paul T. Gonzales (Nacionalista)
  - Vice Mayor: Filemon M. Iran, Jr. (Nacioanalista)
  - Representative: Ferjenel G. Biron (Nacionalista)
  - Municipal Council: Members: Ma. Victoria B. Daraug (Nacionalista); Mary Ann B. Acejo (Nacionalista); Mark Lawrence T. Palec (Nacionalista); Renerose B. Caborubias (Nacionalista); Joey T. Sarasa (NPC); Vincent C. Bustamante (Nacionalista); Herbert G. Ballego (NPC); Ryan A. Villaruel (Nacionalista); Karl Jerson S. Cabangal ^{‡}; Rafael Luis Bacos ^{◌}; ‡ ex officio ABC president; ◌ ex officio SK chairman
  - Electorate: 23,885 voters (2025)

Area
  - Total: 102.89 km^{2} (39.73 sq mi)
- Elevation: 56 m (184 ft)
- Highest elevation: 577 m (1,893 ft)
- Lowest elevation: 0 m (0 ft)

Population (2024 census)
  - Total: 33,790
  - Density: 328.4/km^{2} (850.6/sq mi)
  - Households: 8,209

Economy
  - Income class: 2nd municipal income class
  - Poverty incidence: 14.72% (2023)
  - Revenue: ₱ 195 million (2024)
  - Assets: ₱ 500.8 million (2024)
  - Expenditure: ₱ 65.86 million (2024)
  - Liabilities: ₱ 97.19 million (2024)

Service provider
  - Electricity: Iloilo 3 Electric Cooperative (ILECO 3)
- Time zone: UTC+8 (PST)
- ZIP code: 5010
- PSGC: 063006000
- IDD : area code: +63 (0)33
- Native languages: Hiligaynon; Tagalog
- Website: www.banate.gov.ph

Banate, officially the Municipality of Banate (Hiligaynon: Banwa sang Banate, Kinaray-a: Banwa ka Banate, Tagalog: Bayan ng Banate), is a municipality in the province of Iloilo, Philippines. According to the 2024 census, it has a population of 33,790 people.

The town's economy is primarily based on fishing and agriculture, with extensive areas devoted to rice, sugarcane, vegetables, beans, coconut and bananas. Banate is well known for Kasag (crabs), krill or shimp paste called ginamos, and the fresh fish, which local entrepreneurs distribute not only to the provincial capital and nearby inland towns but also as far as Manila.

== History ==
=== Banate during the Pre-conquest Period ===
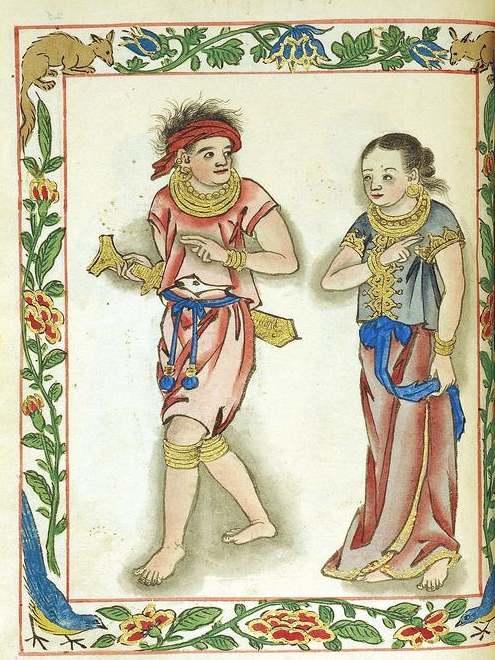
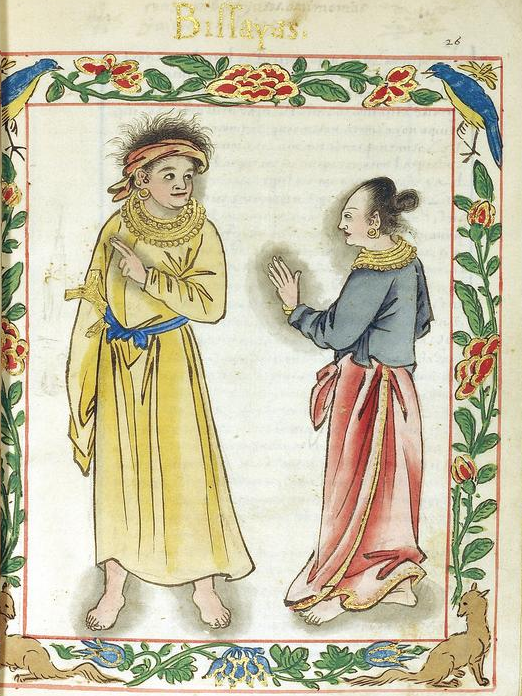
Images from the Boxer Codex (c. 1595), illustrating an ancient Visayans of Panay during their first contact with the Spaniards.

The settlement in Banate is of ancient origin. It was among the ancient organized territories of the Confederation of Madja-as in Panay (also called by the ancient Bornean migrants, the island of "Madya-as"), which the Spaniards found when they came to the Island. It was known to Spanish missionaries during the earliest dates of the colonization as Bobog. The Spanish Augustinian historian, Fray Gaspar de San Agustin, mentions it in an account about Dumangas and other coastal towns of the island, where in ancient times there was a principality and trade center that had the most illustrious nobility in the whole island of Panay. Bobog (Banate), Araut, Anilao, and Hapitan were among the ancient coastal civilizations in Panay.

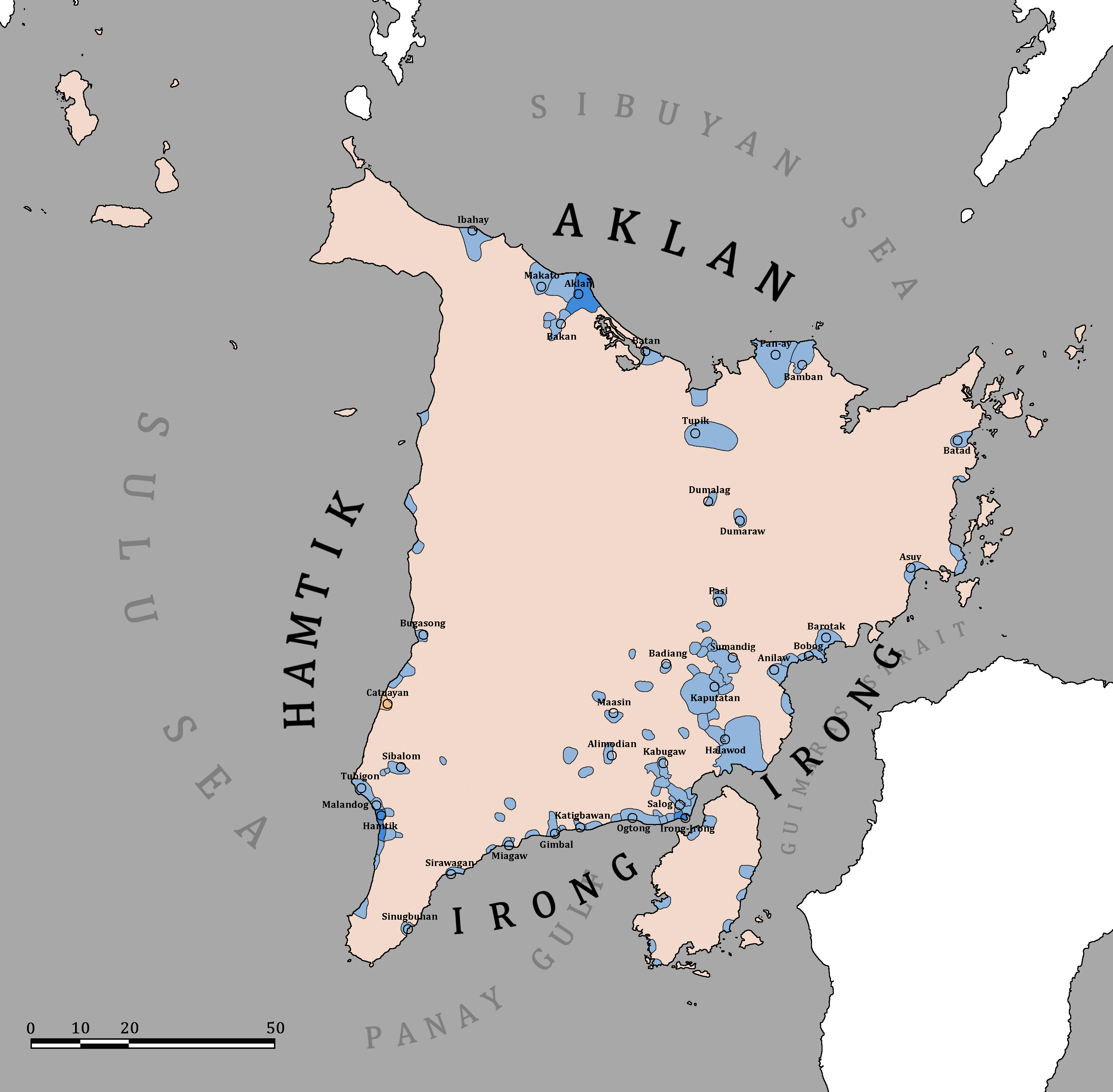
Precolonial map of Panay and Negros showing the ancient polities belonging to the Confederation of Madja-as. Ancient Bobog and Alakaygan are what form the present day Banate.

There are theories that settlers from the powerful ancient thalassocratic Malay empire based on the island of Sumatra, modern-day Indonesia (which influenced much of Southeast Asia) arrived in Banate in around 600 A.D., during the second wave of migration from the Sulawesi Island of the southern archipelago of Southeast Asia. First, the most northern part of Iloilo, Estancia, was settled. Some migrants moved to Batad, Balasan and Carles. Then, Ajuy was settled, and from there communities spread to inhabit the present Conception and San Dionisio area. In time, communities of Ajuy spread upland to populate the hamlet of Sara. The families of Sara spread to Lemery. Other families inhabited the coast of Bobog (Banate-Viejo), and traversed the mountain now called San Rafael. Some families settled near the River Jalaud. Others moved further South and settled in Irong-irong and finally stopped at Ogtong. These independent coastal settlements were engaged in fishing, and settled near rivers.

The Maragtas of Pedro Alcantara Monteclaro mentions that the area near the Alakaygan River was among the first areas to be exploited by the early Malay settlers for agriculture. In these places they cultivated the land, planting kauayan, mabulo, hidiok, bagtikan, sibukao, buri, niog, kulo, kalamansi, paray, batad, kahangkugui and other seed, which they brought from Borneo. Alakaygan and Bubug (Bobog), which gave its name to the ancient society and where the future Spanish population would develop, were among the first settlements established by the Malays in Panay.

As a side note, Alakaygan is the only place in Banate where, until recent years, Tapukal (krill or hipon smoked in the bark of a native tree) was produced. It is a delicacy that can be found only in Banate.

=== Banate during the Spanish Regime ===
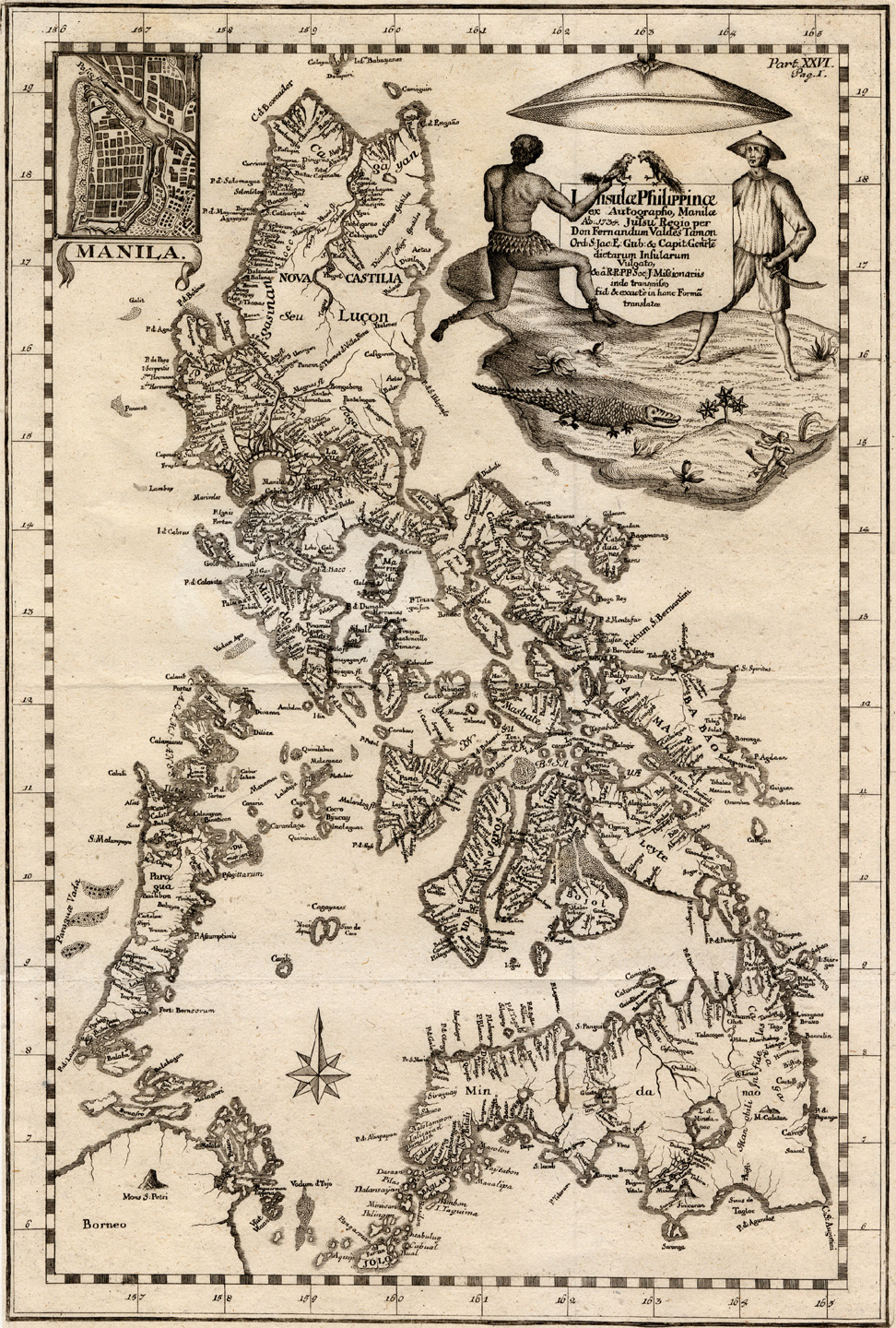
Fr. Murillo Velarde's 1734 Map of the Philippines showing Banate as one of the ancient towns on the island of Panay.

==== Origin of the Town's Name ====
At the beginning of the Christianisation of Panay, Bobog was a visita of the Augustinian parish and monastery of Dumangas. Gaspar de San Agustin mentioned the existence of the town in his book Conquistas de las Islas Filipinas (1565–1615). Another Augustinian historian Fray Juan Fernandez, in his Monografias de los pueblos de la isla de Panay, affirms that Banate was known in the ancient times as Bobog or Bog-og. The Augustinian friar says that the modern name Banate might have been derived from some flora that abundantly thrive in the town. One possibility is the Butacea, named by Carl Linnaeus as Murraya exotica. If the spelling and the pronunciation are corrupted, and instead of Banate what is written or pronounced is Bangate, it would therefore be the leguminous papilionácea called in botany as Abrus praecatorius.

To the inhabitants, the town's modern name is commonly attributed to the presence of many Bangate trees in the area. According to a local legend, when the Spaniards arrived, all the inhabitants of Banate fled away for safety. An old man, however, failed to escape because he was of advanced age and was already so weak. It was raining then. So, the old man took shelter under the Bangate tree where a Spanish officer found him later on. The white man asked the native; "Come se llama esto pueblo?", The old man, uncertain what to say, merely said "Bangate" thinking that the Spaniard was asking him about the name of the tree. Unable to understand clearly what the old man mumbled, the Spaniard thought the native had said "Banate". While such legend sounds too absurd to be true, it is the only explanation often given by people when asked why their town is called Banate. Indeed, 'Bangate' trees still abound within the territorial limits of the municipality.

==== Banate at the Beginning of the Colonial Period ====
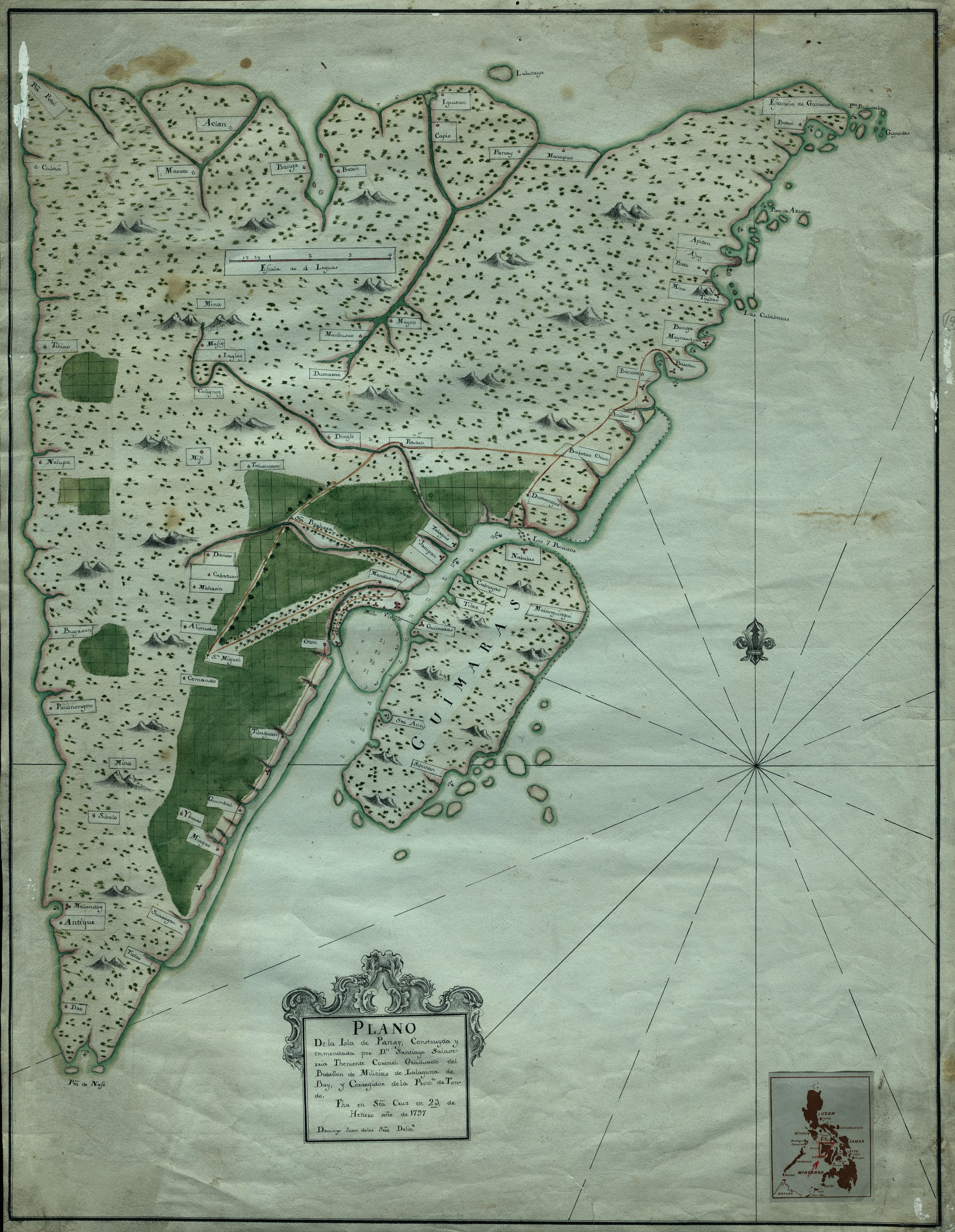
The Map of Panay, with data about the bastions of its coastlines, c. 1797, drawn under the direction of Don Santiago Salaverria, Teniente Coronel graduado de Batallon de Milicias de la Laguna de Bay, y Corregidor de la Provincia de Tondo. The map shows the three bastions of Banate.

Bobog, in the early part of its history as a Christian settlement and a Visita of Dumangas, was placed under the advocation of St. John the Evangelist. In the early part of the 1700s, it was called "Banate Viejo" by the Spaniards. A map of the Philippines, made by the Jesuit priest Fr. Murillo Velarde and published in Manila in 1734, shows Banate Viejo among the ancient towns of the island. The appellative "Viejo", which the Spaniards attached to the early hispanized name of the town, indicates the ancient origin of Banate.

Fr. Juan Fernandez says that Banate was formally established as a municipality in 1763. By then, it acquired as its Visita the settlement of Sinaba-an. (Note: The logical location of "Sinabaan" would be what is now Barotac Viejo. The fact that this town had a history of being attached to Banate, also during the American period, as well as its proximity to Banate support to this theory. Besides, Fr. Murillo Velarde's 1734 Map shows the name "Banate Viejo" extending also over areas where the present Barotac Viejo is located. Another possibility could be San Rafael or San Enrique. However, in Banate's history, there seems to be no reference to this old town's close interaction during the previous centuries with the other two new towns in Iloilo.) In a private definitory of the Augustinian Order, on 31 October 1763, Fr. Alejandro Arias was appointed as Vicar for the town.

Being a coastal village with a rich fishing ground, Banate is naturally inclined to flourish. However, it was also a natural target to invaders. In 1764, many people would leave the town because of a disastrous incursion and pillage of the Moros from Mindanao. R. P. Fray Arias, O.S.A., the town's priest who was at the same time the parish priest of Guimbal, was escaping this raid when he was captured by Moro pirates in that year at the Port of Tayabas. Later, the invaders executed him.

Consequently, after the Muslim pillage, Banate was re-annexed to Dumangas. It later became a Visita with its own teniente de justicia, dependent to Barotac Nuevo for its civil and ecclesiastical government until 1843, when it was declared an independent municipality again. By the end of the 1700s, the inhabitants of Banate have already finished building three stone bastions located at its shores, which defended the town from marauding moros of Mindanao. The three stone structures are prominent in the 1797 Map of Panay drawn under the direction of Don Santiago Salaverria, Teniente Coronel graduado de Batallon de Milicias de la Laguna de Bay, y Corregidor de la Provincia de Tondo (cf. Illustration).

By beginning of the 1800s, the Spaniards noted that Banate profited from the benefit of its good bastions that the native residents built to defend themselves from the moro pirates. Because of this advantageous situation, in a short time, the town was developing again. The Spanish observers foresaw that soon Banate would be a notable town again. It enjoyed good ventilation and healthy climate. Though the houses were of simple construction, but the community had good defenses to protect itself against the frequent Moro incursions. People were engaged in agriculture, which constituted their main occupation. Fishing was also a very important trade because of the abundance of the harvest from Banate Bay.

==== Erection as a Town and Parish ====
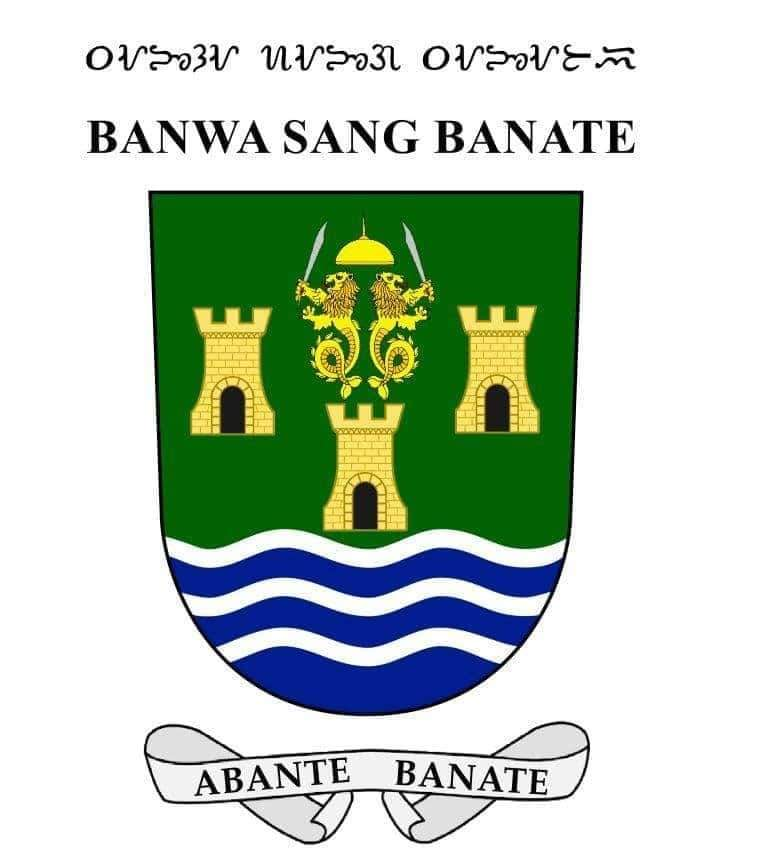
Depiction of Banate and its history in heraldic art.

There is no extant document or act of legislation recording the date of the formal reestablishment of Banate as a municipality in the year 1843. It could be noted, however, that the town had its first duly appointed Gobernadorcillo in the person of Don Felix Baviera, in 1837. Included within the territorial jurisdiction of the town of Banate during that time were Barotac Viejo and Anilao. The original site of the Poblacion of Banate was in what is now known as Bularan. The small Church there, around which the town grew, was then situated near the shore. Nearby, towards the North, the town cemetery was located. For the market place, nipa and bamboo shacks were constructed near the area where the first Church used to be. During the later part of the 19th century the present Roman Catholic stone Church was constructed in the adjacent barangay which subsequently became the Poblacion or the capital of the town.

An extant record published by the Augustinians Friars states that in the year 1845, the town had 1,464 tributaries. It was described as follows:

"It is located by the shore, and has three stone bastions that defend it. Its climate is one of the best in the province. In addition to agriculture, the natives devote themselves to fishing, and export fish to many towns in the province; and women engage themselves in making fine fabrics from pineapple fiber. Its interim parish priest is R. P. Fray Bartolomé Villa, O.S.A., 27 years of age and 4 years in the ministry."

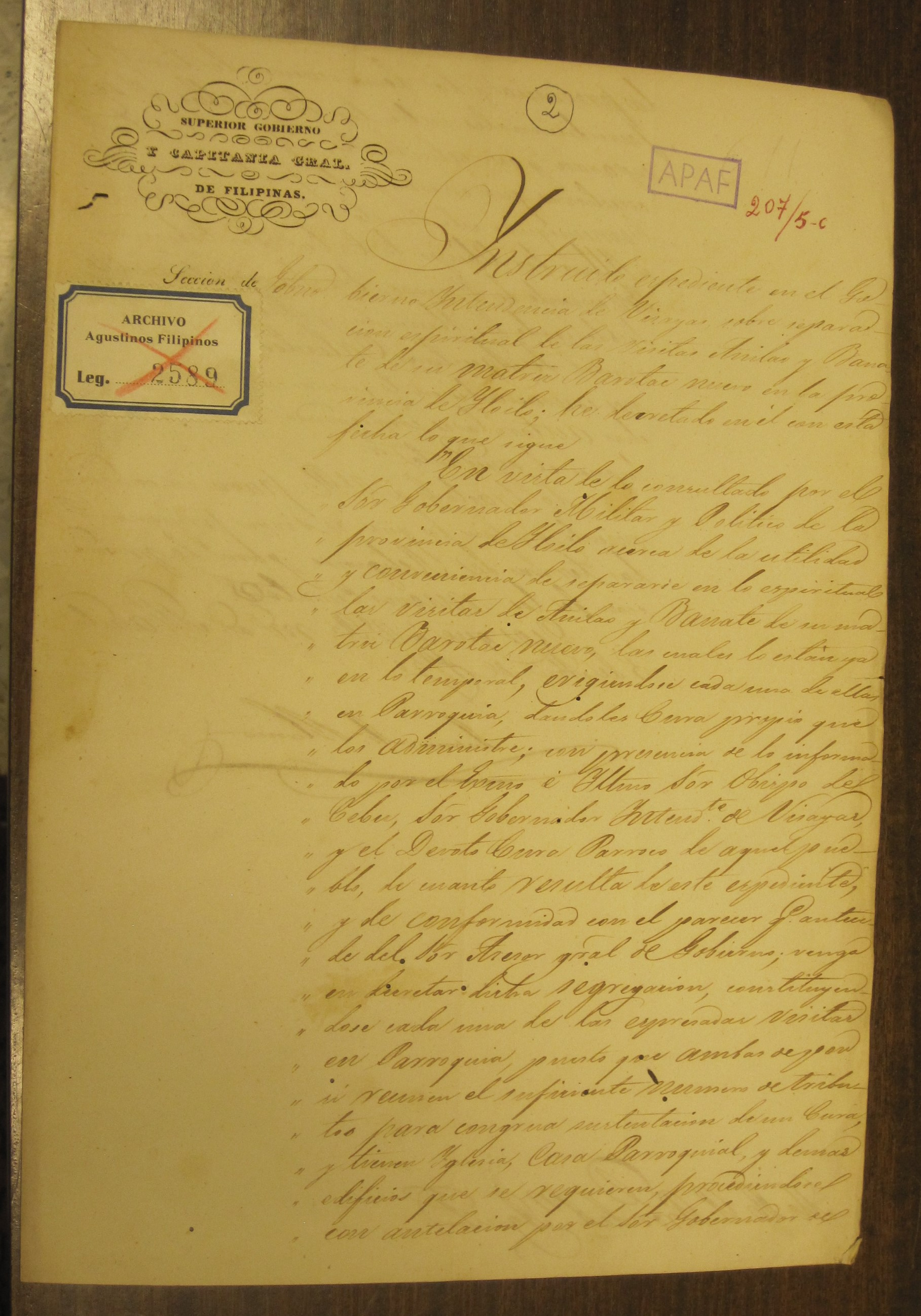
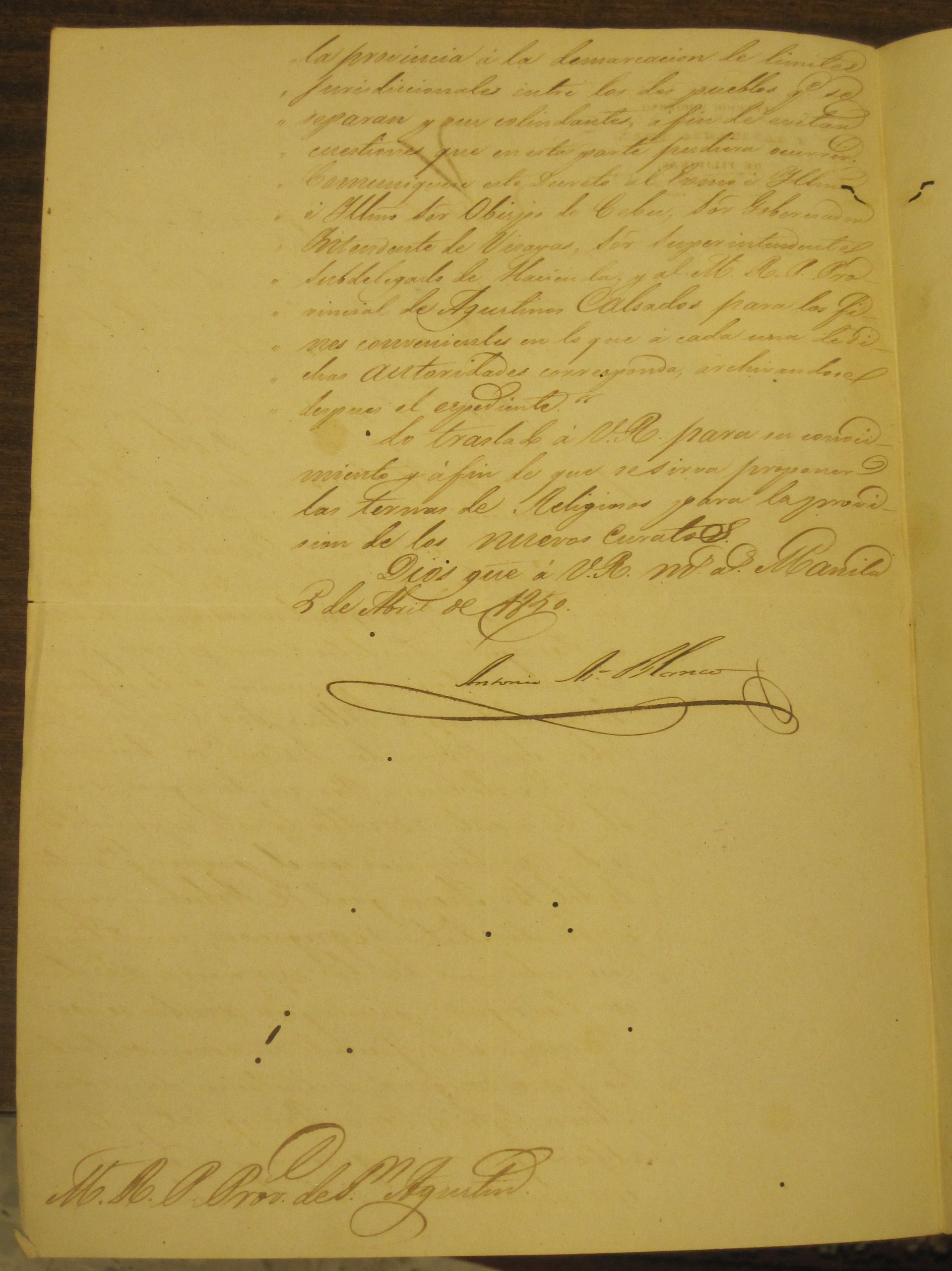
Decree of Governor General Antonio Blanco, dated 5 April 1850, separating the towns of Banate and Anilao from the jurisdiction of Barotac Nuevo in Iloilo (Philippines). The original document is in the custody of the Monastery of the Augustinian Province of the Most Holy Name of Jesus of the Philippines in Valladolid, Spain.

Fray Villa, the interim parish priest, came to manage Banate in 1843. According to Fr. Juan Fernández, O.S.A., it was declared an independent parish under the advocation of St. John the Baptist, as its titutlar. He was given charge of Antique in 1847, and was transferred to Manila for health reasons, in 1856. In the list of priests assigned in Banate, there is no other name between him and the next Augustinian friar who came to the town in 1854.

The official local election results record for the year 1844–45 found in the National Archives (in Manila) entitled Relacion nominal de los Gobernadorcillos, tenientes, juezes, y alguaciles del año corriente con exposicion de sus Pueblos lists Don Pascual Baylon as the Gobernadorcillo of Banate, and that the other town officials during his incumbency were Julian Fuentes- Primer Teniente, Victoriano Bonifacio- Segundo Teniente, Ynesanio Domingo- Primer Juez, Ruberto Cayetano- Segundo Juez, Lucas Espinosa- Primer Alguacil, Juan Mateo- Segundo Alguacil, Juan Ygnacio- Tercer Alguacil.

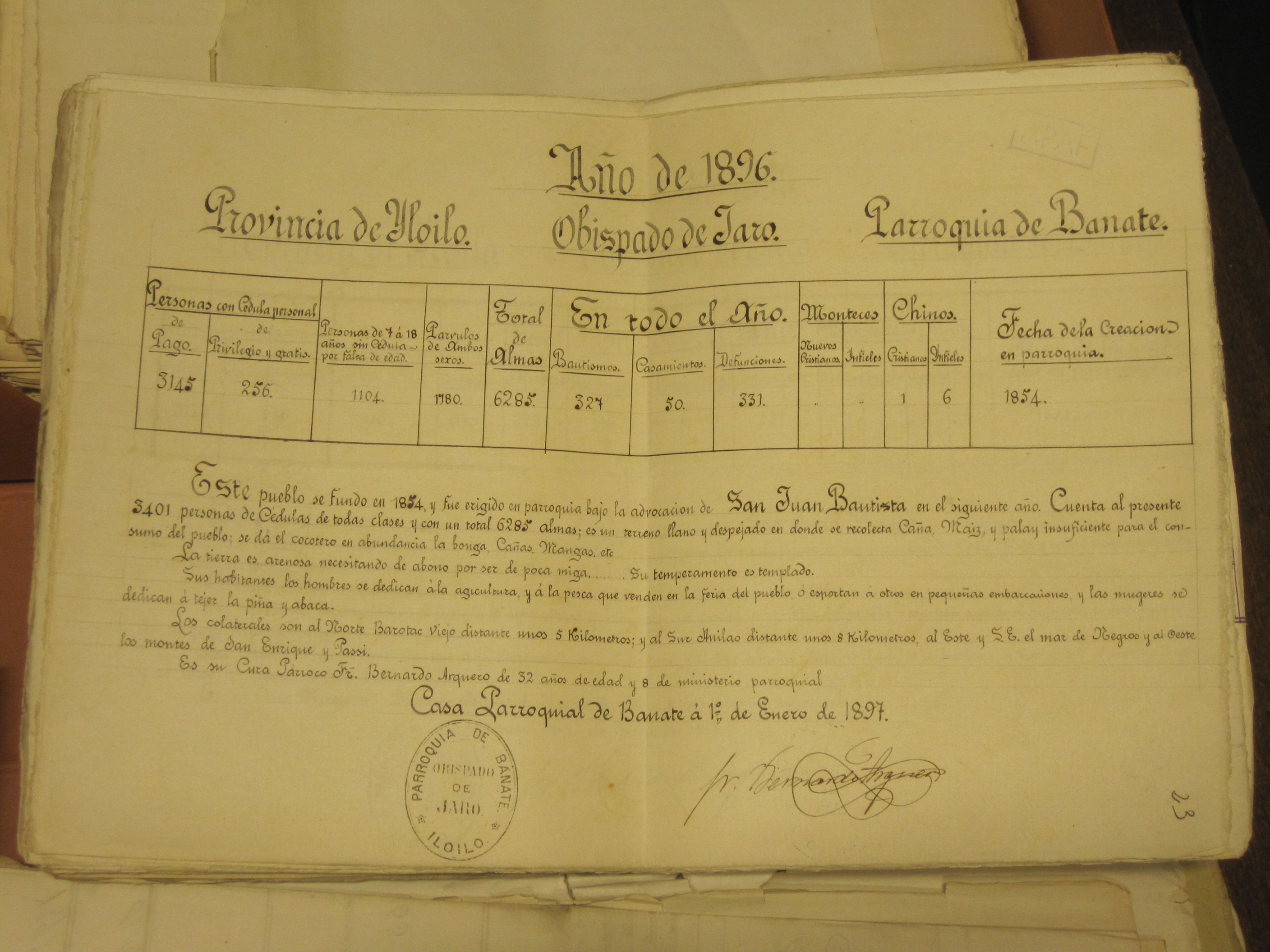
The original manuscript of the report of R.P. Fray Bernardo Arquero, O.S.A., dated 1 January 1897, on the statistical data and historical information of the Parish of St. John the Baptist in Banate, Iloilo (Philippines). The document can be found in the Archives of the Monastery of the Augustinian Province of the Most Holy Name of Jesus of the Philippines in Valladolid, Spain.

Thirteen years after the first Gobernadorcillo of Banate was appointed, Governor General Antonio Blanco declared Banate as an independent parish on 5 April 1850, at the same time as that of Anilao. In his decree, the Governor General noted that Banate was already separated from Barotac Nuevo in its temporal administration, and after consulting with the various Spanish colonial authorities, including the Bishop of Cebu (who had ecclesiastical jurisdiction of the entire Visayas) and the Governor of the Region, he deemed it opportune to decree the separation of the town's spiritual care from its mother Parish of Barotac Nuevo.

In 1854, R. P. Fray Nicolas Calvo, O.S.A., the first full-time parish priest was assigned in Banate. With his stable presence, the town's status as a parish was confirmed and, the following year (in 1855), Governor General Blanco's decree of 1850 was implemented, formally erecting Banate as a parish under the patronage of St. John the Baptist. That year (1855), official records in the National Archives in Manila attest to the election of Capitan Don Tomas Juanico as Gobernadorcillo of Banate, and the following were the other town officials: D. Alfonso Arroyo- Primer Teniente, Pablo Becenra- Segundo Teniente y Juez mayor de Ganados, Sabino Apacible- Juez mayor de Sementeras, Claudio Juanico- Juez de Policia, Fabiano Baquisal- Primer Alguacil, Tobias Bacabac- Segundo Alguacil, Luis Banbeno-Tercer Alguacil. The election of Don Tomas Juanico and other officials of the town in 1855 confirmed furthermore the implementation of Banate's erection as a pueblo.

Because of the benefit of good bastions, the inhabitants benefited more and more from its advantageous internal situation. Within very short years after the resettlement of the town, Banate recovered to be a notable community with plenty of rice, sugar, tobacco, and pineapple fiber fabrics, which the women produced.

The present Church of the parish was built in 1870 by R. P. Eustaqiuo Torés, O.S.A. It was made of stone and wood during the Spanish time. His successor, Fr. Manuel Santos, built the convent made of wood in 1883. (Note: After the World War II, significant renovations and repairs of the Church were made possible through the efforts of several parish priests, like Rt. Rev. Mons. Panfilo T. Brazil, H.P., J.C.D., and Rev. Fr. Quirino Palma, Jr., who succeeded to complete the roof project in 1996. The Bell tower on the right was constructed by Fr. Celda in 1975; and the bigger one on the left, by Rev. Fr. (Col.) Nicasio Lisondra (former Chief of the Philippine Army Chaplains, who became acting parish priest of Banate from 2000–2002) and by the current pastor, Fr. Winifredo H. Losaria, who also led the Banatenhons in building the present parish rectory.)

On 28 October 1898, during the Revolution for Philippine Independence, Banate (which remained loyal to Spain) was reduced to ashes by the rebels under the ill-mannered Juan Maraingan - a leader of one of the bandit groups or "aggraviados" (boyongs, pulahanes, and tulisanes), who took advantage of the unsettled times to come down and attack the Spanish forces and unprotected towns and villages. The revolutionaries welcomed cooperation with these groups, but would later make a clear distinction between the two movements. The relationship between the Principalía-led revolutionaries and the agraviados was marked by distrust and conflict. In the eyes of revolutionaries like Martin Delgado, Ananias Diocno, and Leandro Fullon, the agraviados were outcasts, religious fanatics.

Towards the end of the Spanish rule, Banate had 6,285 residents. All of whom were baptized Catholics, except for 5 of the 6 Chinese residents. At that time, there were 3,145 persons paying tribute ("de pago"), and 256 or around 12.29% classified as exempted or "de privilegio y gratis" (principales).

==== The Spanish Friars Who Evangelized Banate ====
The Parish Priests played important roles in the life of towns of the Philippines during the Spanish Regime. Many of them were the builders of public structures and defenses of colonial towns. Having its own parish priest added prestige to the status of a municipality during that period. Banate had its first priest in 1763. Below is the list of Spanish Augustinian Friars who served the town during the colonial era:

- R. P. Fray Alejandro Arias, O.S.A.

This religious was a native of Villarodrigo, province of Leon. He entered the convent of Valladolid in 1734, at the age of seventeen. He was a missionary of the Italones in 1740, and Minister of Pórac (1744), Magalan and Tarlac (1747), S. Miguel de Mayumo (1747), S. José de los Montes (1750), Anilao (1759), and Guimbál with Banate (1763). He was captured by the Moros in 1764, in the port of Tayabas, and was killed by them.

- R. P. Fray Bartolome Villa, O.S.A. (1843)

He was born in Castañeda in the Province of Oviedo in Asturias, in 1817. He received the Augustinian habit in the Colegio de Valladolid in 1832. On 4 March 1836, he was given the Royal Mandate by Queen Isabela II, together with 23 other Augustinian missionaries, to evangelize in the Philippines. He was 21 years old upon receipt of the mission order, and was still a theologian in the Order of sub-deacons. Fray Villa arrived in the Philippine Islands in November 1836. After finishing his studies in Manila, he went to Visayas, where he held the parishes of Banate and Antique in 1843 and 1847 respectively. In 1856, he came to Manila and, taking sick leave in the town of Gapán, died on May 2 in the same year (1856).

- R. P. Fray Nicolas Calvo, O.S.A. (1854)

A native of Villasarracino, in the province of Palencia; son of Zoilo and Benita Andrés. He was born in 1819. He took his religious vows in the Colegio de Valladolid in 1844, and ministered the parishes of San Pedro (1850), Banate (1854) and Igbaras (1858) in Visayas, dying in this last town assignment, on June 13, 1861.

Fray Calvo was among the 13 Augustinian priests and 7 friars in minors orders, who were given the Royal permission by Queen Isabela II, on 20 January 1845, to embark from the port of Santander, for Philippine mission.

- R. P. Fray Julián Alonso, O.S.A. (1859)

He was born in Valladolid in 1833; and son of Felipe Benicio Alonso and Patricia Barriuso. After having taken religious profession in the Colegio de los Agustinos of the aforementioned city on 13 May 1851 and, having received the Royal mandate of Queen Isabela II earlier, on 25 September 1854 (No. 131), he moved to Manila in 1855 to begin his missionary work in the Philippines. Here he was ordained a priest and, soon after, obedience destined him to go to the province of Iloilo, where he administered the towns of Banate in 1859, and Barotac Nuevo from 1865 to July 2, 1878, date of his death.

- R. P. Fray Eustaqiuo Torés, O.S.A. (1870)

Fray Eustaqiuo Torés was a native of Olmedo, Province of Valladolid; son of Nemesio and Lorenza Sanz. He received the religious habit in Valladolid in 1861, made profession of his first vows in 1862; and his final vows on June 26, 1868, at the age of 23 years, after 6 years in the Order. His studies include Philosophy, Theology, and Cycle I of Canon Law.

The young Augustinian went to the Philippines, already a deacon, in 1868, having received earlier, on 4 December 1867, the Royal Order of Queen Isabela II (No. 59), to embark on mission to the Archipelago. He administered in the province of Iloilo the curates of Banate and Barotac Nuevo in 1870 and 1882 respectively. In these towns, he built churches made of stone blocks and of wood. He died in Barotac Nuevo, on May 4, 1888.

- R. P. Fray Manuel Santos, O.S.A. (1882)
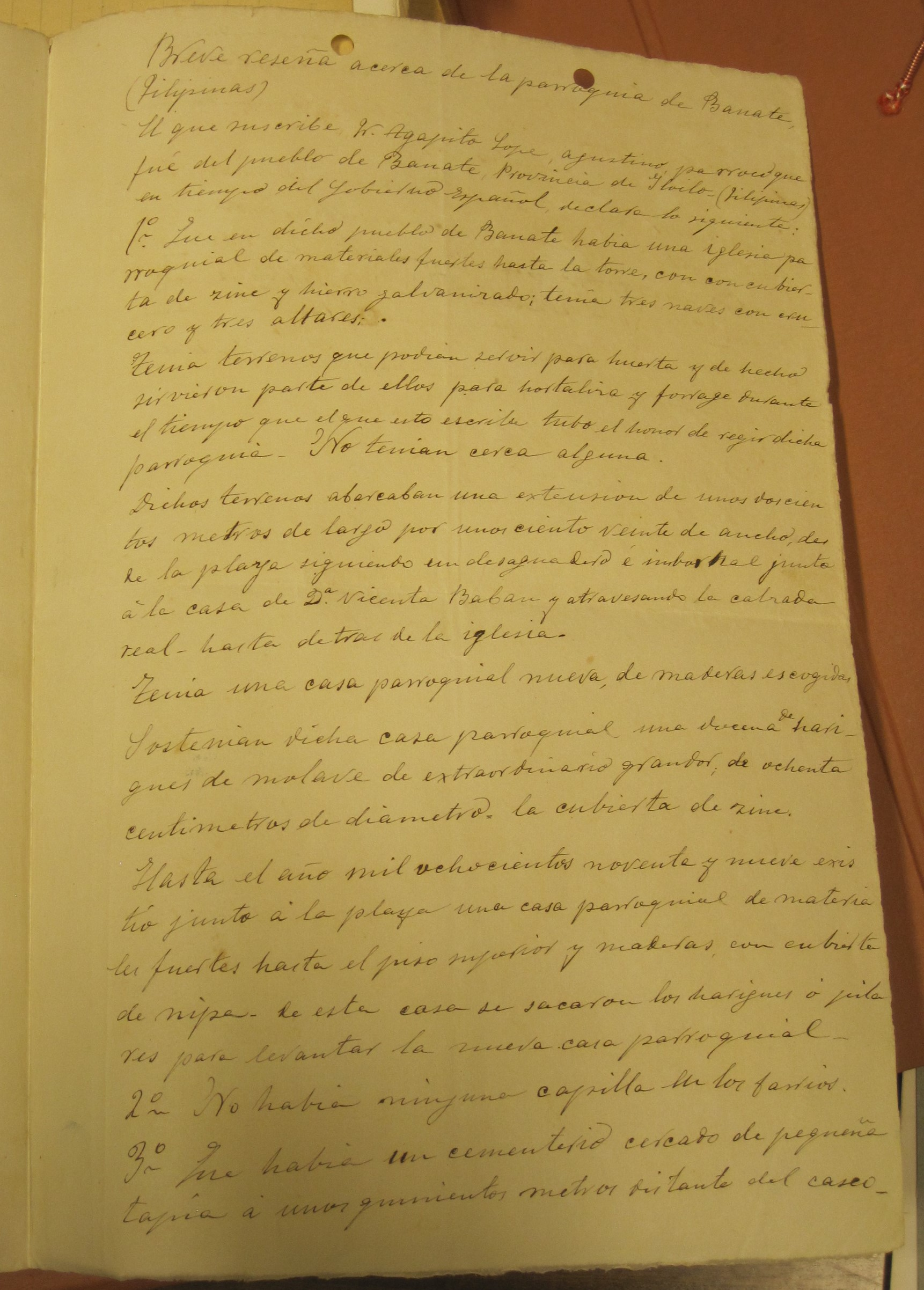
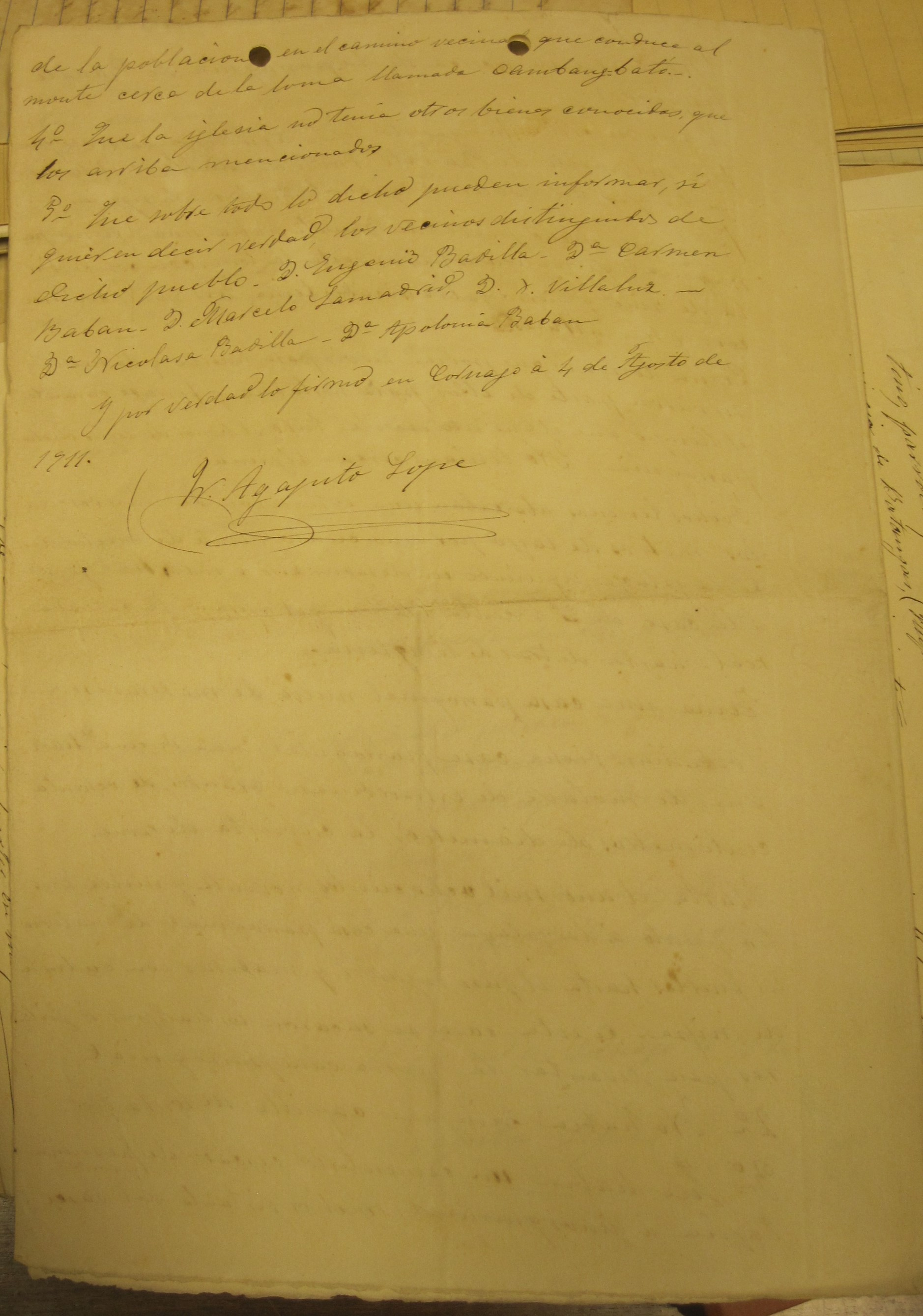
Report regarding the description of the Parish of St. John the Baptist in Banate, Iloilo (Philippines), as well as its people and the properties of the Church in the town. The report was made by of R. P. Fray Agapito Lope, O.S.A., parish priest of Banate in 1893. The document was written and signed in Cornago, La Rioja, Spain, and dated 4 August 1911. The original is in the custody of the Monastery of the Augustinian Province of the Most Holy Name of Jesus of the Philippines in Valladolid, Spain.

He was born in Iglesias (Burgos) in 1853; son of Ruperto an Bonifacio González. He made his religious profession in the Colegio de Valladolid, on 21 September 1870.

On 13 November 1873, Fray Santos and 9 other Augustinian friars received the permission of the Government of the First Spanish Republic, to embark for mission in the Philippines. In the Visayas, he served as associate of the parish priest of Santa Barbara in 1878, and parish priest of Banate, (in which town he built the wooden parish rectory) from 1883 to June 29, 1889, the day of his death.

- R. P. Fray Lazaro Ramirez, O.S.A. (1890)

This religious was born in Bergüenda (Alava). After embracing the monastic life in the Colegio de Valladolid in 1879 at the age of seventeen, he arrived in the Philippine Archipelago, already a deacon, in 1886. Ordained as a priest in December of this same year, he studied the Panay dialect in the town of Santa Bárbara. He served the parishes of Mina in 1888, Banate 1890, Ajui in 1892, and Pavia from 1895 to 1898. It was from Pavia where, full of the spirit of God and eager to preach the Gospel to the pagans, he went to the missions of Hun-Nan (China) where he continued to work in such a glorious zeal. He finished building the beautiful church of Pavia and prepared it for sacred cult.

- R. P. Fray Agapito Lope, O.S.A. (1893)

Native of Cornago in La Rioja. He was born on 24 March 1859. He did his first religious profession in the Colegio de Valladolid, on 25 October 1877. Fulfilling the mandate of his superiors, he left Spain for the Philippines, to whose capital he arrived on 10 September 1884. In the Philippines, after completing his regular studies, he was assigned as parish priest of Barotac Viejo (1886), S. Miguel (1890), Bánate (1892), Dingle (1893), Igbarás (1894), Librarian of the convent of the Santo Niño de Cebú (1895), parish priest of Dueñas (1897) and associate of the parish priest of Maasin (from the month of September of that year until November 1898.) He died in Spain in the early 1900s.

An extant document of the Report made by Fray Lope regarding the description of the Parish and its people, as well as describing the Church properties in Banate, exists in the custody of the Monastery of the Augustinian Province of the Most Holy Name of Jesus of the Philippines in Valladolid, Spain. The document, which was written and signed in Cornago, La Rioja (the hometown of the Spanish Friar) is dated 4 August 1911. At the end of the document, Fray Lope mentions the "vecinos distinguidos" (distinguished residents) of the Banate: Don Eugenio Badilla, Doña Carmen Baban, Don Marcelo (La)Madrid, Don (Florencio) Villaluz, Doña Nicolasa Badilla, and Doña Apolonia Baban.

- R. P. Fray Bernardo Arquero, O.S.A. (1893)

He was born in the town of Ocaña, province of Toledo, on August 20, 1864. He was professed in Valladolid in 1880, and was ordained a priest in the following year upon his arrival in the Philippine Archipelago. He was parish priest of Dueñas in 1889, and of Banate from 1893 to 1898. Afterwards he served as professor of the Seminary of Manaus, of the State and Diocese of Amazons (Brazil). His name is cast on the largest bell of Banate.

Fray Arquero is also known for the manuscript he redacted on 1 January 1897, regarding the statistical data and historical information of the Parish of St. John the Baptist in Banate, Iloilo (Philippines)at the later part of the Spanish rule. The document can be found in the Archives of the Monastery of the Augustinian Province of the Most Holy Name of Jesus of the Philippines in Valladolid, Spain.

=== Banate during the American Regime ===
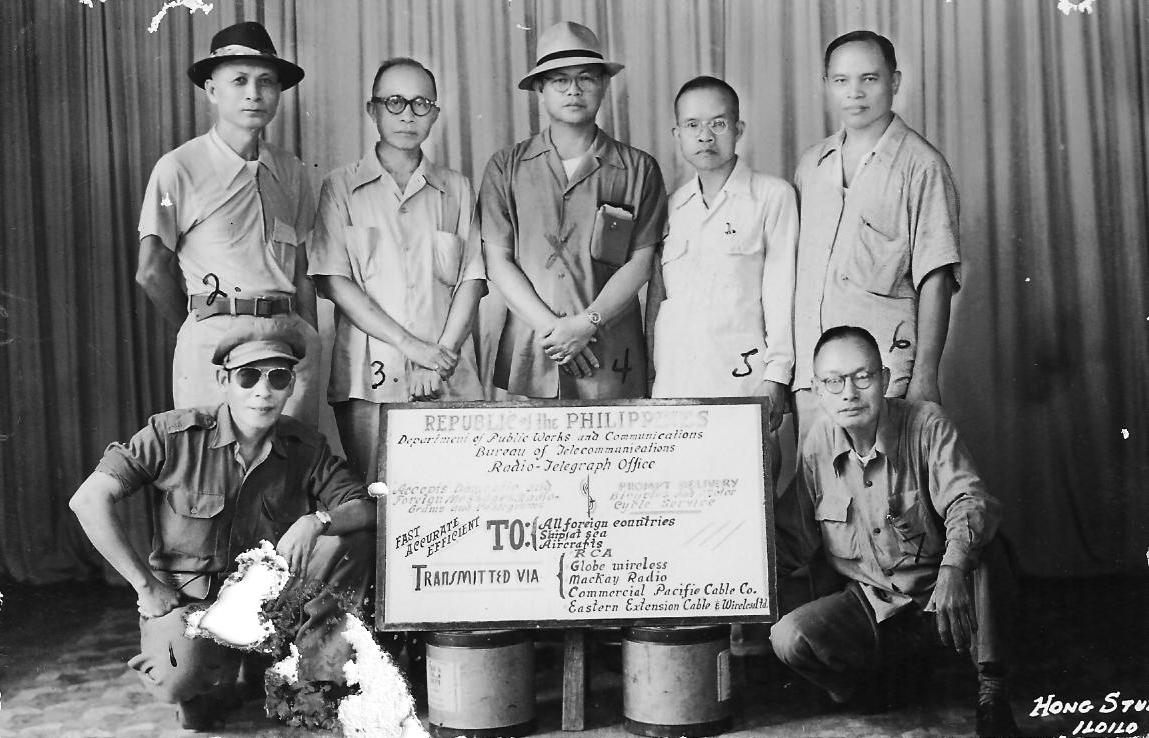
Ludovico Arroyo Bañas, (standing in the middle) with his staff at the Office of the Telecommunications Bureau, Region IV, in Iloilo City, c. late 1950s.

When the Americans seized control of Panay at the later part of 1899, Banate was among the first settlements they bombarded and chosen as landing spot for their forces. On October 27, 1899, General Diocno informed General Delgado of the docking at Iloilo of the USS Concord. On board were 3,000 troops and 200 horses. On November 2, two American gunboats bombarded the town of Banate. On the 5th, American forces began their advance outside the frontlines toward San Miguel. Landings were made in Banate on November 25, in Capiz and Calivo in December, and in San Jose de Buenavista in January 1900. Unable to resist the American advance, the Filipino revolutionaries retreated to the mountains of Panay. Delgado retreated to the mountains of Lambunao, Diocno to the hills of Aclan, and Fullon to the vicinity of Mt. Madia-as. By July 1, 1900, the Panay defenders had opted to shift to guerrilla tactics.

By the beginning of 1901, the disenchanted revolutionaries had run out of men, ammunition, and food. In February, Delgado surrendered to the Americans. On March 1, Fullon followed suit, and on March 21, Diocno signed the Paz de Aclan. Colonel Salas continued the fight until October.

When the American rule was established, the town's population was 6,250 (2973 males and 3277 females).

When the Revolution broke out in 1898, Ciriaco Fuentes, more popularly known as Capitan Takong, was the Gobernadorcillo. He was succeeded by Don Eugenio Badilla as the first local President shortly after the town became part of the United States territory in 1901, upon the arrival and takeover of the American soldiers under the command of Commander Brunnel, who established the American rule in Banate.

The town's first officials under the American Regime were the following:

- Don Eugenio Badilla, President
- Don Marcelo Madrid
- Don Florencio Villaluz
- Don Ciriaco Fuentes
- Don Fortunato Perez
- Don Nemesic Badilla

N. B. Don Eugenio Badilla, Don Marcelo Madrid, Don Florencio Villaluz were also listed by the second to the last Spanish Friar assigned in Banate as among the distinguished residents of the town during the last years of the Spanish Era.

From 1 October 1901, an American teacher was also stationed in Banate.

During this American, Barotac Viejo and Anilao were reduced as districts under Banate. The Administrative Act No. 2657 of the Insular Government of the Philippine Islands, dated 31 December 1916, shows Banate as one of the 24 Municipalities in Iloilo, and of the five towns belonging to the Fifth District the Province. On 1 January 1918, Barotac Viejo was separated through the Executive Order No. 84 of the American Governor General. On that occasion, the majority of the town Officials of Banate were Barotacnons. As a consequence, there came about a succession of appointed Presidents in Banate, until the time of the next election. (Note: This section was transferred from what was before the introductory part for the section about the Presidents of Banate during the American Regime.) During the term of Benjamin Buyco as President of the town (1936–1939), Anilao was separated from Banate. Afterwards, Benjamin Buyco also became the first Mayor of Anilao.

During this period, a Banatenhon - Ludovico Arroyo Bañas - was chosen as one of the ten personnel of the American government telegraph service in the Philippines to compose the first and only group of Filipino pensionados who, in 1919, underwent advanced training in wireless telegraphy (radio), at the US Naval Radio School in Cavite. The training of the ten Filipinos was made possible through a special arrangement between the U. S. Naval Authorities in the Philippines and the Insular Government. To select the trainees, a special examination was conducted among the 398 students of the Post-Telegraph School. Later, Bañas (who is one of the prominent figures in the history of Philippine Telecommunications) became the Regional Superintendent of the Bureau of Telecommunications (BUTEL) in Region IV (Panay, Negros, Romblon, and Palawan), at the time of his retirement, on 16 February 1966.

== Geography ==
Banate is 51 kilometres (32 mi) from Iloilo City.

=== Barangays ===
Banate is politically subdivided into 18 barangays. Each barangay consists of puroks and some have sitios.

There are 7 barangays which are along the coast and the rest are in the interior uplands.

- Alacaygan
- Bariga
- Belen
- Bobon
- Bularan
- Carmelo
- De La Paz
- Dugwakan
- Fuentes
- Juanico
- Libertad
- Magdalo
- Managopaya
- Merced
- Poblacion
- San Salvador
- Talokgangan
- Zona Sur

=== Climate ===
Climate data for Banate, Iloilo
Month	Jan	Feb	Mar	Apr	May	Jun	Jul	Aug	Sep	Oct	Nov	Dec	Year
Mean daily maximum °C (°F)	28 (82)	29 (84)	30 (86)	32 (90)	32 (90)	31 (88)	30 (86)	29 (84)	29 (84)	29 (84)	29 (84)	28 (82)	30 (85)
Mean daily minimum °C (°F)	23 (73)	23 (73)	23 (73)	24 (75)	25 (77)	25 (77)	25 (77)	24 (75)	24 (75)	24 (75)	24 (75)	23 (73)	24 (75)
Average precipitation mm (inches)	57 (2.2)	37 (1.5)	41 (1.6)	42 (1.7)	98 (3.9)	155 (6.1)	187 (7.4)	162 (6.4)	179 (7.0)	188 (7.4)	114 (4.5)	78 (3.1)	1,338 (52.8)
Average rainy days	12.0	7.7	9.2	10.2	19.5	24.6	26.9	25.1	25.5	25.2	18.0	13.0	216.9
Source: Meteoblue (Use with caution: this is modeled/calculated data, not measured locally.)

== Demographics ==
Population census of Banate
Year	Pop.	±% p.a.
1903	5,272	—
1918	8,871	+3.53%
1939	16,210	+2.91%
1948	10,932	−4.28%
1960	11,995	+0.78%
1970	14,179	+1.68%
1975	16,270	+2.80%
1980	17,710	+1.71%
1990	23,364	+2.81%
1995	24,976	+1.26%
2000	27,263	+1.90%
2007	28,714	+0.72%
2010	29,543	+1.04%
2015	32,532	+1.85%
2020	33,376	+0.54%
2024	33,790	+0.30%
Source: Philippine Statistics Authority

In the 2024 census, the population of Banate was 33,790 people, with a density of 330 inhabitants per square kilometre or 850 inhabitants per square mile.

The 1995 National Census on Population and Housing shows that Banate had a total population of 24,976 excluding those residing in Fuentes (a contested barangay between Banate and Anilao). However, if Fuentes is included, the total population would be 25,597. Banate has average annual population growth rate of 1.21% based on the population change within the years 1990–1995. In the year 2010, the town's population reached 29,543.

=== The Natives of Banate ===
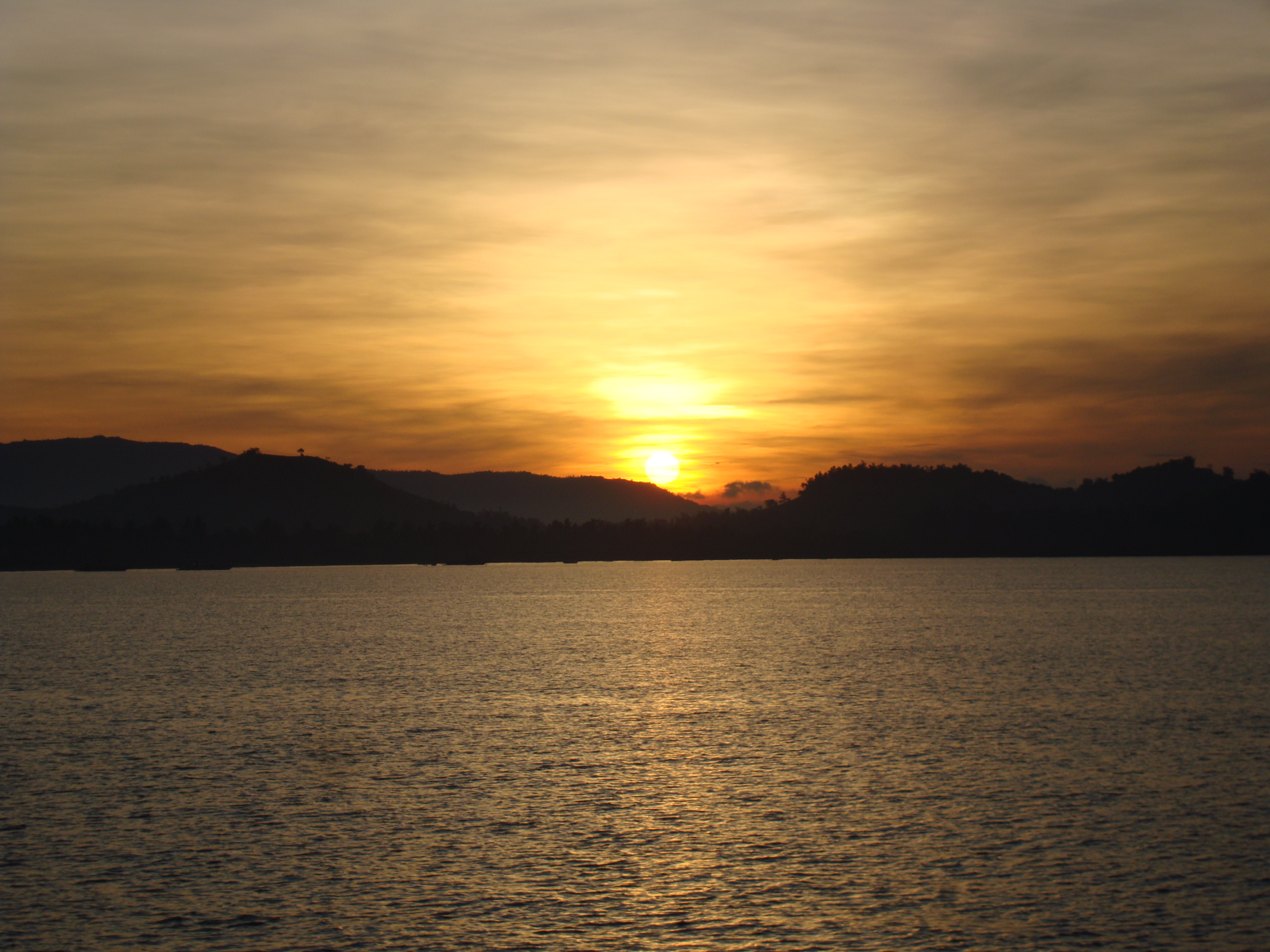
Sunrise at Banate Bay

As any other old Spanish town in the province of Iloilo, the natives of Banate were given surnames starting usually with the letter BA, BAL, BAS, etc. after the name of the town itself. This is also true for Barotac Viejo which was once a part of the pueblo which is why one can notice even up to the present that both towns share some families/clans with the same surnames.

=== Household ===
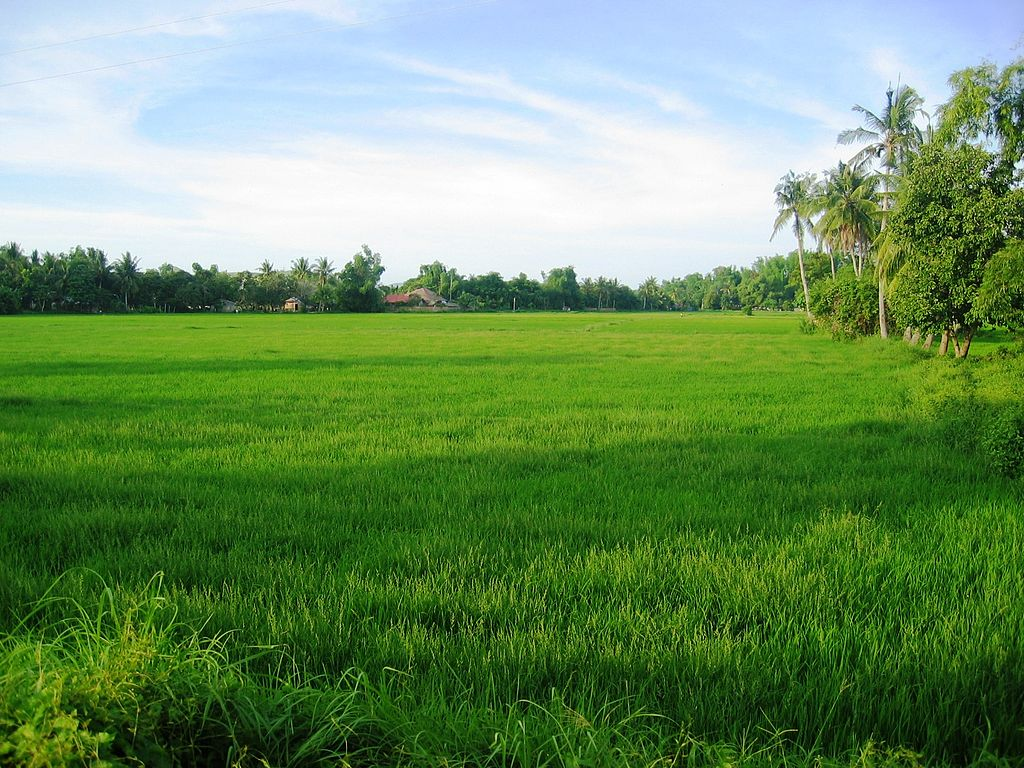
Barangay Carmelo, Banate

The 1995 Census of Population and Housing (which includes Fuentes) recorded a total of 4,761 households with an average household size of 6 person per household for the urban area, and 5 persons per household for the rural area. The urban area, comprising Poblacion, Alacaygan, Bularan, Carmelo, Talokgangan and Zona Sur, had a total household of 1,653. The 12 rural barangays had a total of 2,908 households with San Salvador having the highest number households (480).

The 12 barangays belonging to the rural area had a population of 15,772 or about 62% of the total population of Banate. Of the 12 barangays, San Salvador had the highest population (2,380 or 9.31%), while Fuentes, (a disputed barangay between Banate and Anilao) had the least population of only 621 persons or 4% of the rural population, since some residents considered themselves residents of Anilao.

=== Population density ===
Banate has an A & D area of 5,240.849 and a population of 25,597 as of 1995. The municipal gross density is 500 people/km^{2}. Urban density is 1600 people/km^{2}, of which Bularan is the highest having a density of 15,700 people/km^{2}. In the rural area, population density is 300 people/km^{2}. As projected, within the twelve (12) year period (1999–2010), the municipal gross population density will increase from 500 to 600 people/km^{2}.

=== Age-sex distribution ===
Of the 25,597 (as of 1995), the male population has numbered 12,949 or 50.59% with those in the age bracket of 5 – 9 years old having the highest population (1,743 or 13%). The age bracket with the lowest percentage are those with the age ranging from 85 years old and above (30 or 0.23%).On the other hand, female population has reached to 12,648 or 49.41% with those in the age range of 5 – 9 years old having the highest number (1,649 or 13%). The female residents with age range of 85 and above number 48 or 0.38%. The date of the census of 1995 shows that the ratio of male and female residents is 102:100.

=== Religion ===
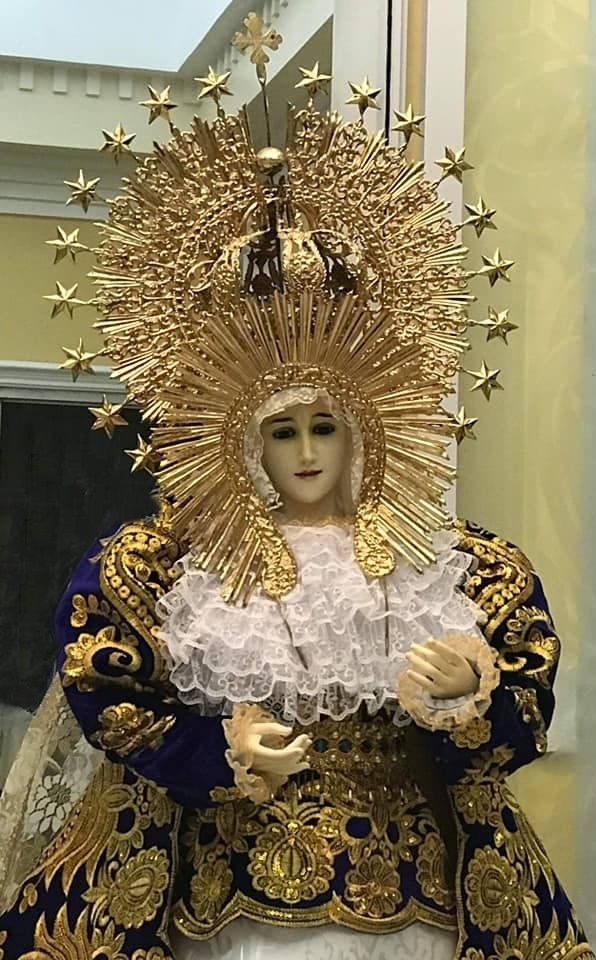
Devotion to the Blessed Virgin Mary is popular among the Roman Catholics who compose the majority of the residents in Banate, as well as among the members of the Aglipayan denomination, which has a considerable number of followers in the town.

Based on the 1990 record, the majority of the Banatenhon's are Roman Catholics (16,338 or 70%); the next religious denomination with the second highest number of adherence are the Aglipayans or the members of the Philippine Independent Church (5,057 or 22%); there are 750 Protestants who comprise 3% of the population; Iglesia ni Cristo has 203 churchgoers or 1% of the population; and members of other religious sects like United Church of Christ in the Philippines, Jehovah's Witnesses, Seventh Day Adventist, Muslims, etc. number 1,012 or 4% of the local population.

=== Statistics on marriage ===
A greater percentage of the population 10 years old and over are single (49.32%) than married (45.75%). About 3.73% are widowed; 0.37% are separated; and 0.82% are common law partners and unknown. The number of unmarried persons is higher among the adult males (4,840) as compared with those who are married (4,174). Among adult females the proportion of married persons is higher (4,253 or 23.09%) than those who are unmarried (4,245 or 23.05%).

=== Language ===
Majority of the people living in Banate speak Hiligaynon. Some speak other Visayan languages. English and Tagalog are also understood and spoken, and are also used in school, business, and government day to day transactions.

It is notable that when Banatenhons speak Hiligaynon, people from other places could easily distinguish the accent, most of the time dismissing the Banatenhons as Dumangasanons. Among the towns in the surrounding area, only Banate and Dumangas speak pure Hiligaynon, as opposed to other towns whose native tongue is Kinaray-a.

=== Labor force ===
As of 1990 the labor force numbered 13,643 persons or 57% of the total population. Of these, there are 6,747 or 49.45% male and 6,896 or 50.55% female ranging the age 15 years old and above. Of the 13,643, 7,886 have stable employment. 5,239 of these are male and 2,647 are female. Population projection shows that from 1995 to the year 2010, the population growth rate is 1.21%. This means an additional potential work force for the municipality, which when properly exploited will generate a maximum income to the town of Banate. The labor force within the twelve (12) year period (1999–2010) will reach to 18,683 and 11,527 of these, will be economically active labor force (15 years old and over).

== Economy ==
Poverty incidence of Banate (%)

Source: Philippine Statistics Authority

=== Economic dependency ratio ===
As of 1995, a total of 10,711 persons with ages below 15 and over 64 years old are considered dependents; 14,625 belong to the working population with ages 15–65 years old. Hence, there are 7 dependents out of 10 working persons.

=== Municipal income ===
Being a very versatile town with livelihood income both coming from the sea and the farmlands, Banate has generated actual income from calendar year 1995 to calendar year 1999 reaching up to P82,167,999.30. The increase of the town's income was mainly due to the increase in revenue allotment, tax, and operating revenue of the municipality. It could be observed that Banate is increasingly growing in commerce and industry.

== Historical landmarks ==
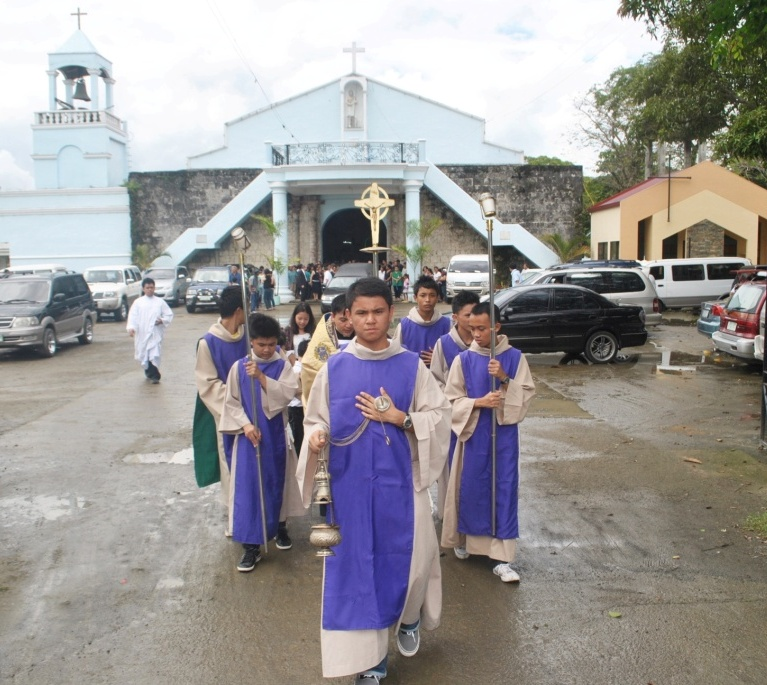
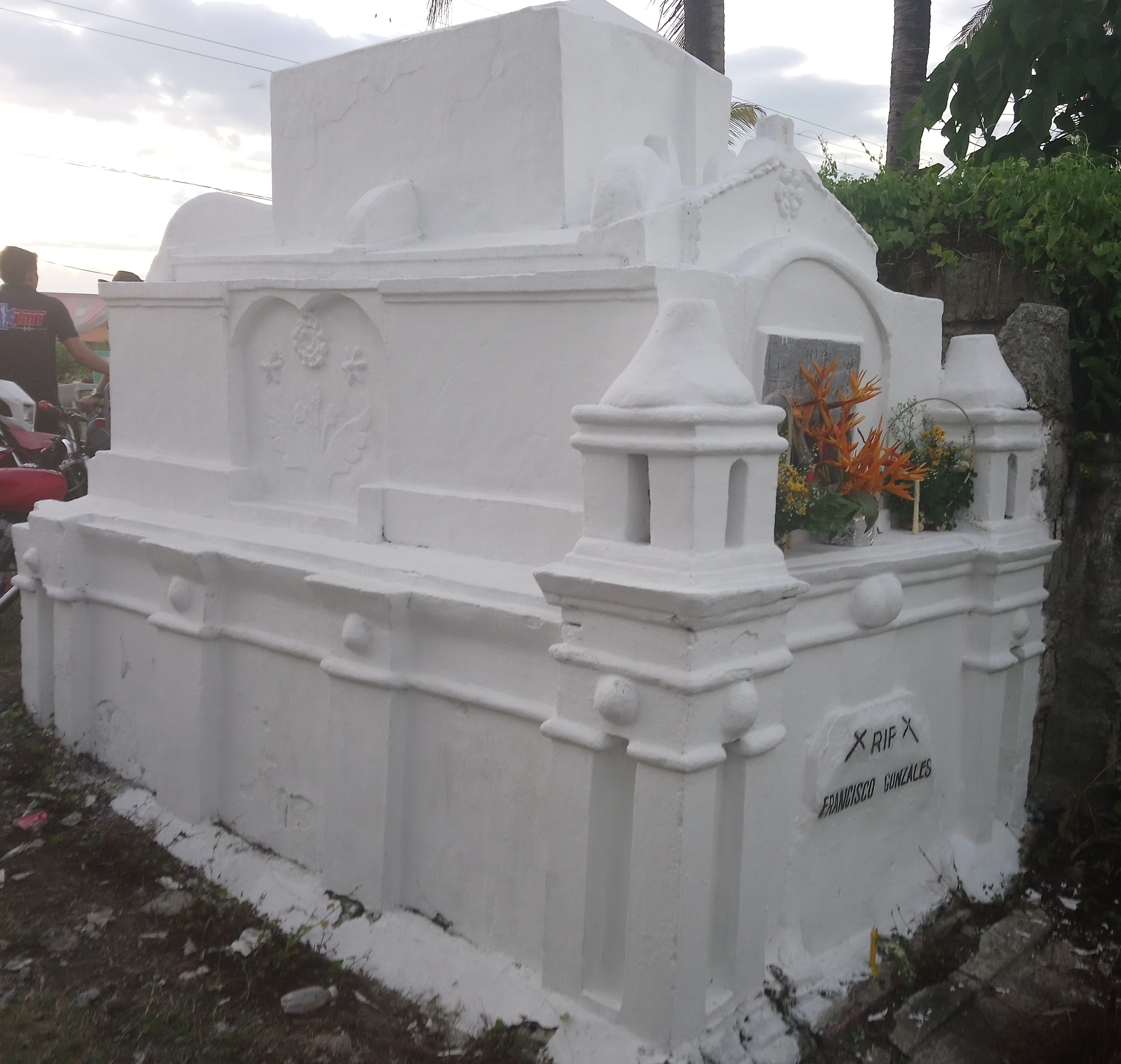
Two historical landmarks in Banate dating back to the Spanish colonial period. Left to right: [1] The Church of the Roman Catholic Parish of St. John the Baptist in Banate, Iloilo (Philippines), in October 2012. The unpainted part exposing the old uniformly cut blocks of coral stones is the zócalo de piedra (lower part made of stones) of the original building built by Fray Eustaqiuo Torés, O.S.A.; [2] Ancestral tomb of the Balderas-Baviera Clan of Banate at the Roman Catholic Cemetery of the town.

=== Landmarks during the Colonial Period ===
Three Stone Bastions located at the shore that defended the town of Banate, from marauding Muslims of Mindanao.

Municipal Hall made of wood.

Parochial Church made of strong materials up to the tower, with zinc and galvanized steel roof. It has three naves with a transept and three altars; the lower part (or the walls) made of stone.

School made of (bamboo) cane.

Parochial House made of chosen woods. The aforementioned parish house was supported by a dozen molave harigues of extraordinary enormity of eighty centimeters in diameter. It had zinc roof. Until the year one thousand eight hundred and ninety and nine, there was another parish house that existed next to the beach. That, too, was made of strong materials until the upper floor, and the roof was made of wood with covered of nipa. From this house the harigues or pillars were removed to build the new parochial house.

Cemetery about five hundred meters distant from the Poblacion settlement; and located on the road that leads to the mountain near the hill called "Cambang-bato", which was enclosed by a short wall made of (bamboo) cane.

The Municipal Hall, Church, School, and the Cemetery were made under the supervision of R.P. Fray Eustaquio Torés, O.S.A., while the Parochial House was made by R.P. Fray Manuel Santos, O.S.A.

=== Roman Catholic Church ===
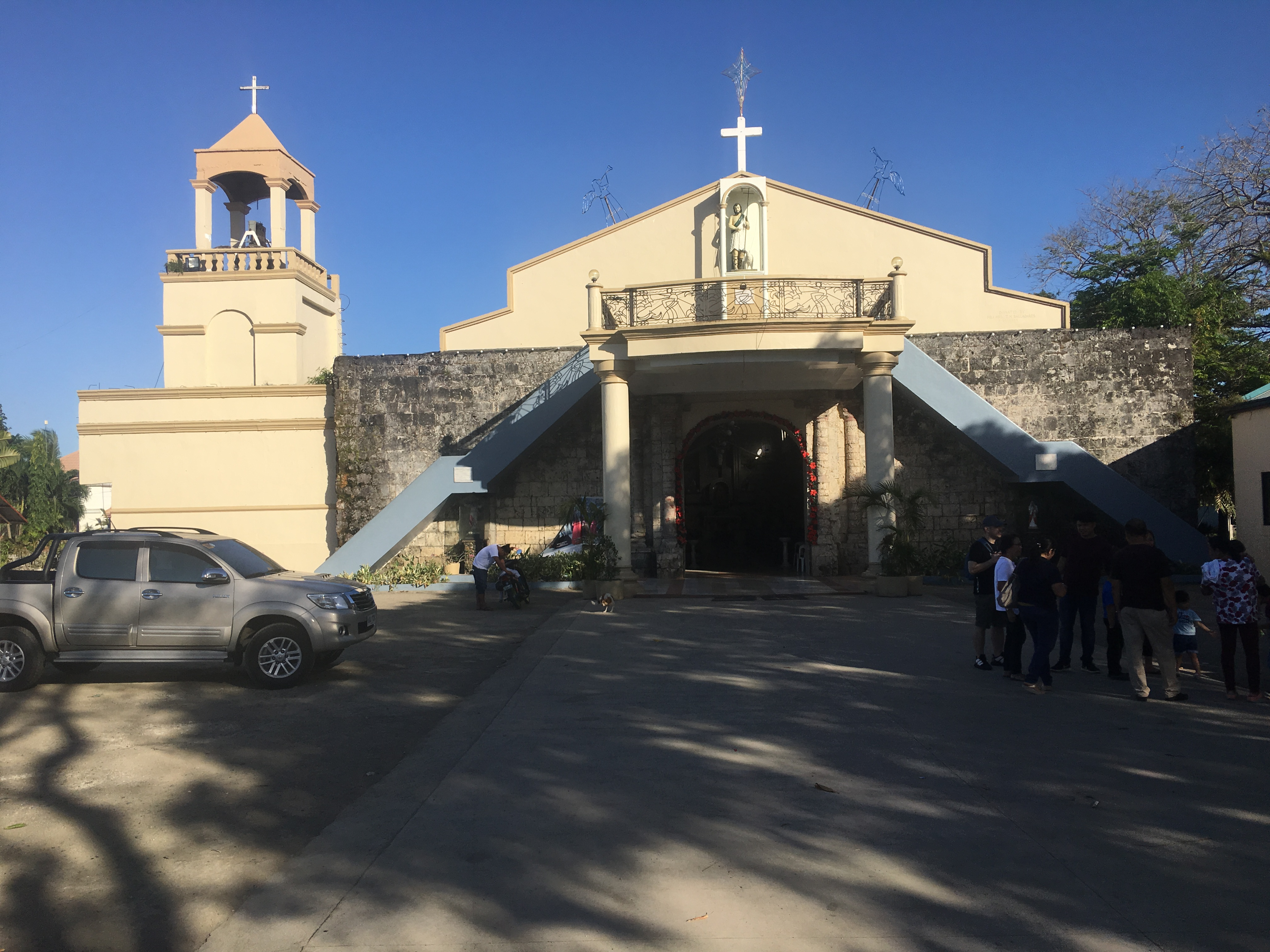
The Roman Catholic Parish Church of Saint John the Baptist of Banate, in Iloilo, Philippines. It has had several renovations since it was built in 1870.

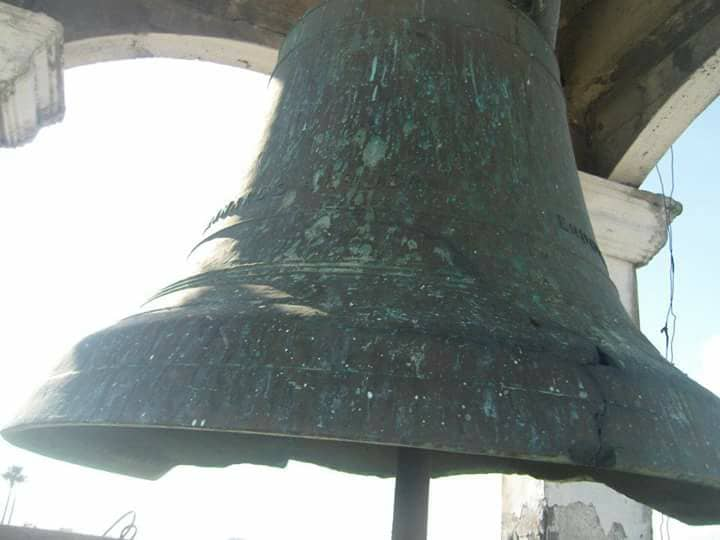
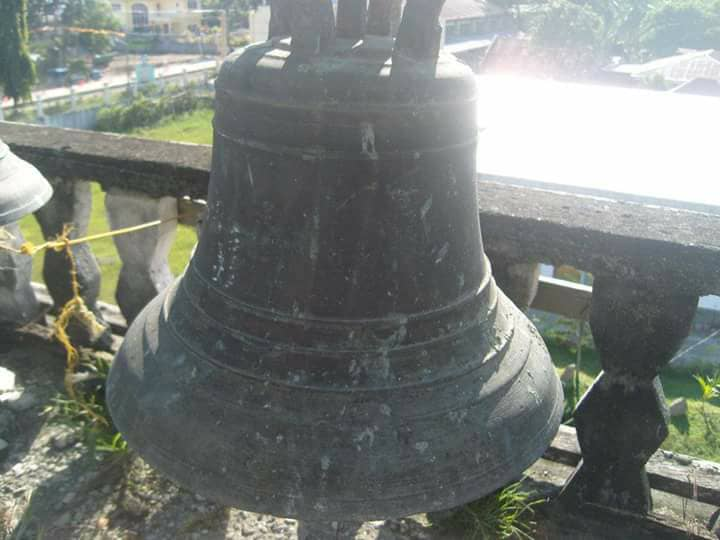
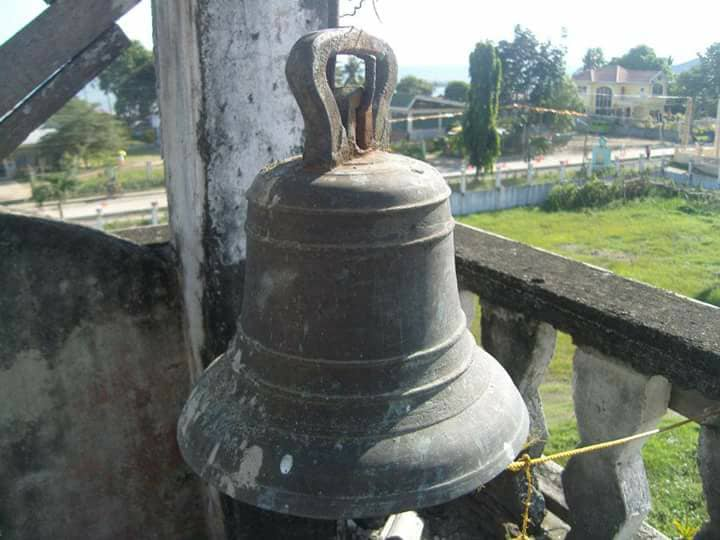
Bells cast by Hilario Sunico for St. John the Baptist Parish in Banate, Iloilo (Philippines) during the incumbency of the Fray Bernardo Arquero, O.S.A. as parish priest (1893-1898). Left to right: [1] The biggest bell donated by Doña Carmen Baban, one of the town's notables; [2] the medium size bell; [3] the smallest bell.

The Catholic parish of Banate celebrated its 250th foundation anniversary in 2013. The Catholic community was established in Banate by the friars of the Augustinian Order in 1763, when Fray Alejandro Arias was assigned to in the town. The present church was erected under the supervision of Fray Eustaqio Torés, OSA in 1870. But was left unfinished when Fray Torés was transferred to Barotac Nuevo, where he also built another church. This probably explains why there is no particular architectural style found in the edifice. Nevertheless, the church of Banate withstood the tests of time, from fires to the bombings of the war. Built in the shape of a Latin cross, it is one of the old churches in Iloilo, still intact and whole from the narthex to the apse and transepts, unlike some churches which were either cut into half or damaged either by nature or war. It is made of corals, limestone, and rocks and is put together through a mixture of Apog and Eggs. The first detailed description of the church building can be found in the 1911 Report of Fray Agapito Lope, parish priest of Banate in 1893. It is also one of the widest, in terms of space, having three spacious naves all in all-surpassing even that of Santa Barbara or Lambunao.

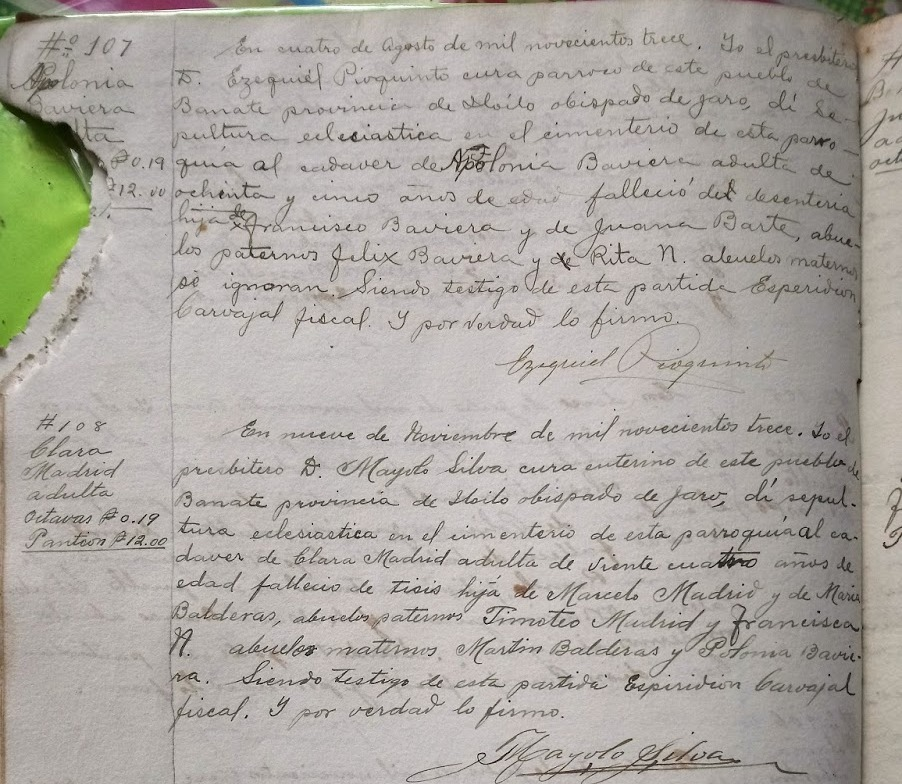
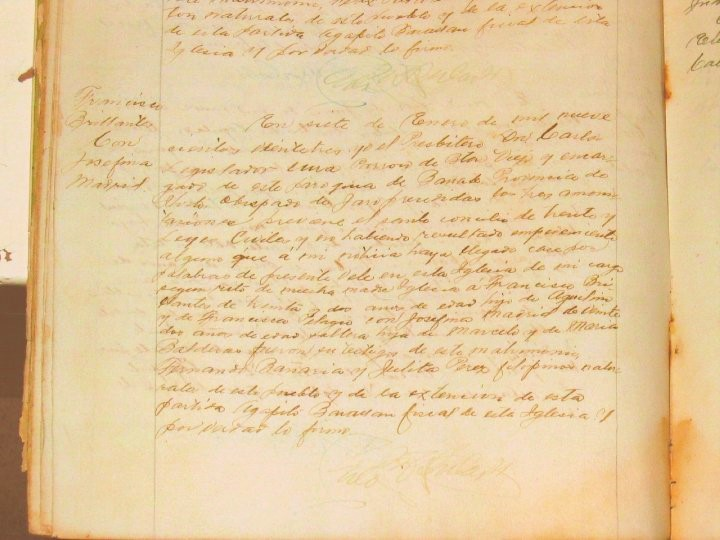
Sample of entries in old Canonical Books of St. John the Baptist Roman Catholic Church. Left to right: [1] Registry of Burials in the Cemetery of St. John the Baptist Roman Catholic Parish, Banate, Iloilo (Philippines), entries nos. 107 and 108. Entry n. 107: Registry of burial, dated 4 August 1913, of Doña Apolonia Baviera y Barte (81 years old), wife of Don Martin Balderas (Gobernadorcillo of Banate), daughter of Don Francisco Baviera and Doña Juana Barte, and granddaughter of Don Felix Baviera (First Gobernadorcillo of Banate in 1837) and his wife Doña Rita. Manuscript signed by Rev.do Don Ezekiel Pioquinto, Parish Priest of Banate. Note: Signs that the error in the first name of the dead person (Polonia) was corrected (Apolonia) are conspicuously evident. It was probably done by the same priest, as shown by similar handwriting. Entry n. 108: Burial Registry, dated 9 November 1913, of Clara Madrid y Balderas (24 years old), daughter of Don Marcelo Madrid (Spaniard from Barcelona, Spain) and Doña Maria Balderas; granddaughter of Timoteo and Francisca Madrid (natives of Barcelona, Spain) and of Don Martin Balderas (Gobernadorcillo of Banate) and Apolonia (written as Polonia) Baviera; great great granddaughter of Don Felix Baviera (the First Gobernadorcillo of Banate in 1837). Manuscript signed by Rev.do Don Mayolo Silva, Interim Parish Priest of Banate.; [2] Registry of the matrimony of Josefina Madrid, daughter of Don Marcelo Madrid and Doña Maria Balderas, to Francisco Brillantes, son of Aquilino Brillantes y Juanico (grandson of Doña Lucia Balderas and Don Tomas Juanico, Gobernadorcillo of Banate in 1855-1856, by their daughter Doña Andrea Juanico y Balderas and Don Vicente Brillantes y Blancaflor) and Francisca Pelagio, on 7 January 1923.

The last Augustinian curate of Banate, Fray Bernardo Arquero, OSA, commissioned the three bells donated by Doña Carmen Baban and cast by the renowned bell caster Hilario Sunico. The campana mayor is one of the largest in the island but it is, unfortunately, broken. It is the last existing old Augustinian-built church in the north. It was built under forced labor. The parish also boasts of having complete old baptismal, marriage and death records dating back to the early 1900s which can be found in the parish office.

Parish and Assistant Priests who served the Parish of Banate from 19-present (records from 1763–1898, 1899–1909, 1941–44 [World War II Era] are perhaps gone already). After the revolution against Spain, the parishes under the friar orders, Banate being one (under the Augustinians), were handed over to the care of the secular clergy of the dioceses. The following are the names of the priests who had performed their ministry in Banate, as retrieved in the parish register of baptisms:

- Reverendo Padre Ezequiel Pioquinto
- RP Mayolo Silva
- RP Doroteo Imperial - Parroco Interino (Acting Parish Priest)
- RP Mayolo Silva
- RP Ramon Declaro - Parroco Interino
- RP Mayolo Silva
- RP Carlos Legislador - Cura Parroco de Barotac Viejo y encargado de la parroquia de Banate
- RP Tomas Paguntalan
- RP Gregorio Rosaldes
- RP Pedro Sedantes
- RP Miguel Tadifa - Parroco Interino
- RP Pedro Sedantes
- RP Vicente Silloras
- RP Jose Villasis
- RP Ireneo Pontiliano
- RP Francisco Garcisto
- RP Policarpio Parcon

N.B.

During the time of Fr. Parcon, the Congregation of the Most Holy Redeemer (Redemptorist Fathers) had a mission in Banate, during which a number of Aglipayans converted to Catholicism, as noted in the parish register of Baptisms. The Redemptorists fathers were: RP Patrick Scott, CSsr, and RP William Daley, CSsr.

- RP Ramon Declaro
- RP Mons. Panfilo Brazil
- RP Amadeo Escanan - Parroco Auxiliar
- RP Francisco Celda (Note: The free-standing belfry on the right of the Church façade was constructed during the time of Fr. Celda, through the contribution of parishioners and of their relatives working in other cities in the Philippines and abroad.)
- RP Agapito Sumbong
- RP Quirino Palma, Jr. (1980-1996) (Note: Fr. Palma was known in Bnate for his active involvement in the Neocatechumenal Way and has known and worked with Kiko Argüello and other priests in the Archdiocese of Jaro in establishing the first Communities of this movement in the Philippines. The Neocatechumenal Communities in Banate were among the first three in the Philippines. They trace their roots in the Parish of Santa Ana in Molo (Iloilo City), which was founded by Argüello himself in the early 1980s. The other parish which has the second oldest Community in the Philippines is the Santo Niño Parish of Arevalo, Iloilo City.) (Note: Fr. Palma is also remembered for his tireless work of encouraging the parishioners (of this once sleepy parish) at taking more active roles in the life of the Church. He was the first parish priest to have introduced a Parish Pastoral Council in this town. He also labored toward the renovation of the Church, including the replacement of the old roof with the new one with steel trusses, while sacrificing and choosing to live in an old rectory.) (Note: Fr. Palma celebrated his Silver Sacerdotal Anniversary in Banate in 1987. Twenty-five years later, while already assigned in another parish, he returned to Banate to celebrate his Golden Sacerdotal Anniversary, which was participated enthusiastically by his devoted friends and former parishioners, who contributed food and expenses in order to make this special occasion a memorable one, and in order to express their gratitude and love for Fr. Palma.)
- RP Elmer Tababa - Parroco Auxiliar
- RP Ramon Sequito - Parroco Auxiliar (Note: Fr. Sequito was known in Banate for his active apostolate in the Charismatic movement. Later in his ministry, he founded a group of lay evangelists, which paved the way for the establishment of "Diyos Gugma" - a popular lay apostolate in the Archdiocese of Jaro, which is engaged in spiritual healing.)
- RP Ildefonso Tagamolila - Parroco Auxuliar
- RP William Villalobos - Parroco Auxiliar (Note: Fr. Villalobos later joined the military service as a Chaplain in the Philippine Army.)
- RP Francisco Gabriel - Parroco Auxilar
- RP Francisco Apologista (1996-2001)
- RP Nicasio Lesondra (2001-2003) (Note: Rev. Fr. Nicasio Lisondra spent most of his life as a military chaplain. He retired in 1996 with the rank of Colonel, serving as the Chief Chaplain of the Philippine Army. His retirement years were spent as parish priest of Banate.)
- RP Lorenzo Camacho (2003-2005)
- RP Winifredo Losaria (2005-2011) (Note: The current concrete rectory was completed during the time of Fr. Losaria. Generous contributions from parishioners and their families poured in, also for the construction of the concrete fence of the Church property.)
- RP Edgar Palmos (2011-2017)
- RP Franklin Pilaspilas (2017–2023)
- RP Jerry Recabar-Locsin (2023–present)

== Culture ==
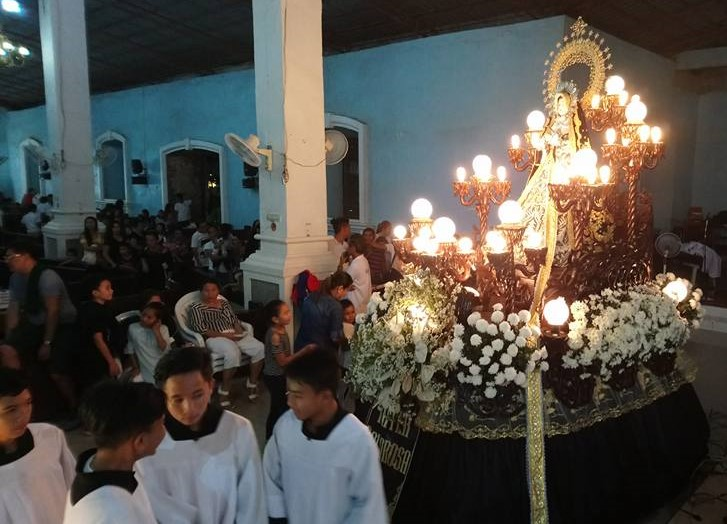
The centuries-old ivory image of Mater Dolorosa belonging to the descendants of Capitan Don Martin Balderas, Gobernadorcillo of Banate in the 19th century. The Dolorosa is one of the centuries-old cultural patrimony icons of Banate, seen only during the Good Friday procession.

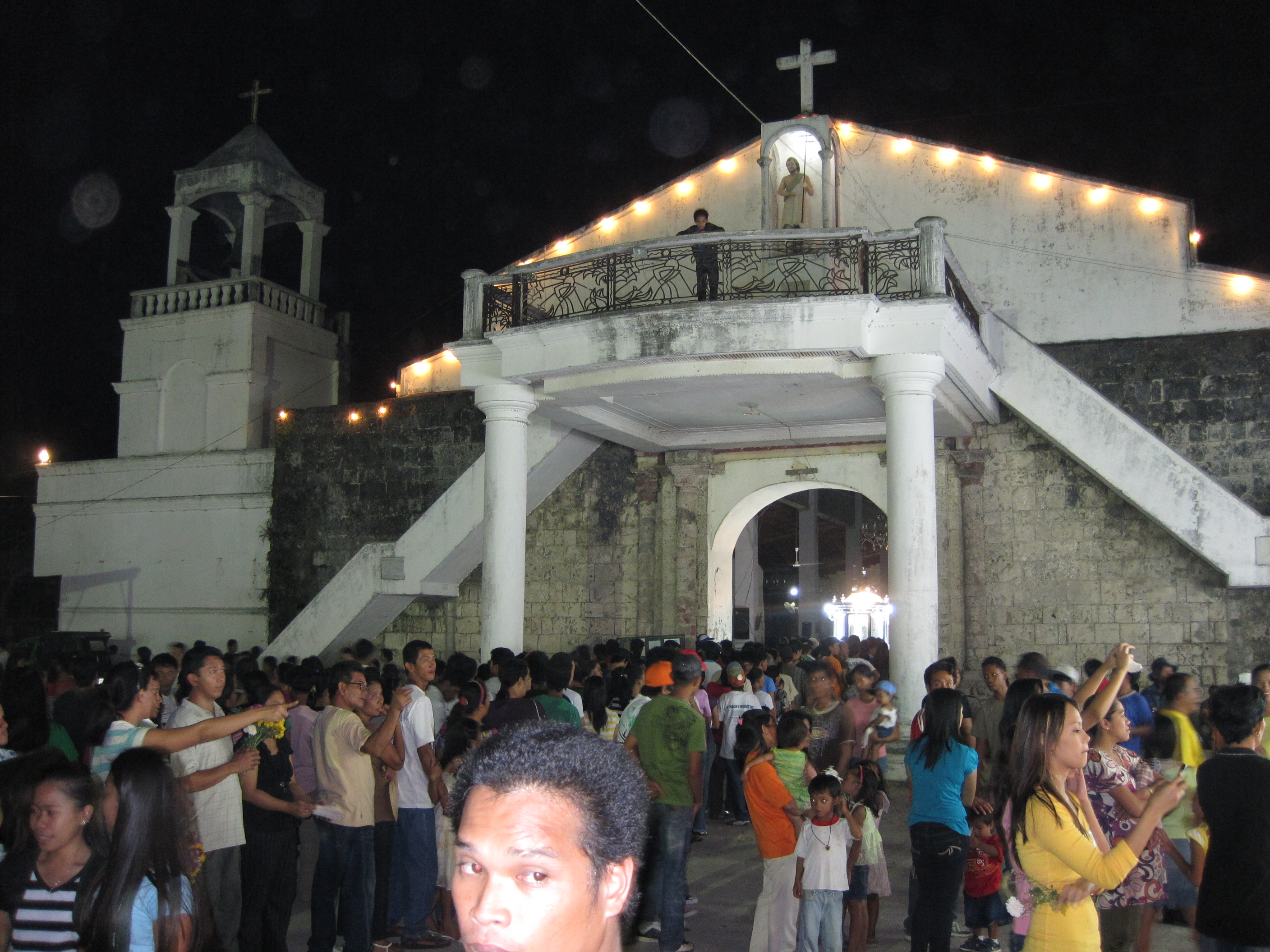
The Christian faithful waiting their turn to venerate the Santo Entierro after the Good Friday Procession. Duaw, as it is commonly known in Banate, is one of the customs of Banatenhons during the Semana Santa Celebration.

=== San Juan Fiesta ===
Every year, since 1855, the town of Banate celebrates the feast of its Patron St. John the Baptist, on the 24th of June. The "Diana," a marching band, wakes the townsfolk early in the morning so as to signal opening of the fiesta. Masses are held, in both Roman Catholic and Aglipayan Churches after which, devotees' carry in procession a decorated carroza containing the statue of the Patron saint through the main streets of the town. The townspeople cook typical delicious dishes for the guests to eat and, later in the afternoon, children as well as teenagers go to the plaza to enjoy the fun at the "peryahan". People would throw water to everyone roaming in the streets, as part of the celebration. In the evening, a "search" for Miss Banate is held in the municipal covered gymnasium, where the crowd would pack in the gym, in order to cheer for their respective candidates.

=== Semana Santa Celebration ===
Banate has, for centuries, also observed the Holy Week celebration in the traditional Catholic custom. The town boasts of antique ivory religious images, which are only seen displayed during the Easter Triduum celebrations and processions. Both the Roman Catholic and the Aglipayan Communities in this town have preserved the Western and Catholic way of making the memory of the passion, death and resurrection of Jesus Christ alive through the heritage received from the Spaniards, who evangelized the town for centuries. The meditation on the seven last words of Jesus and the re-enactment of his last moments on calvary attract devotees from neighboring towns on Good Fridays.

=== Kasag Festival ===
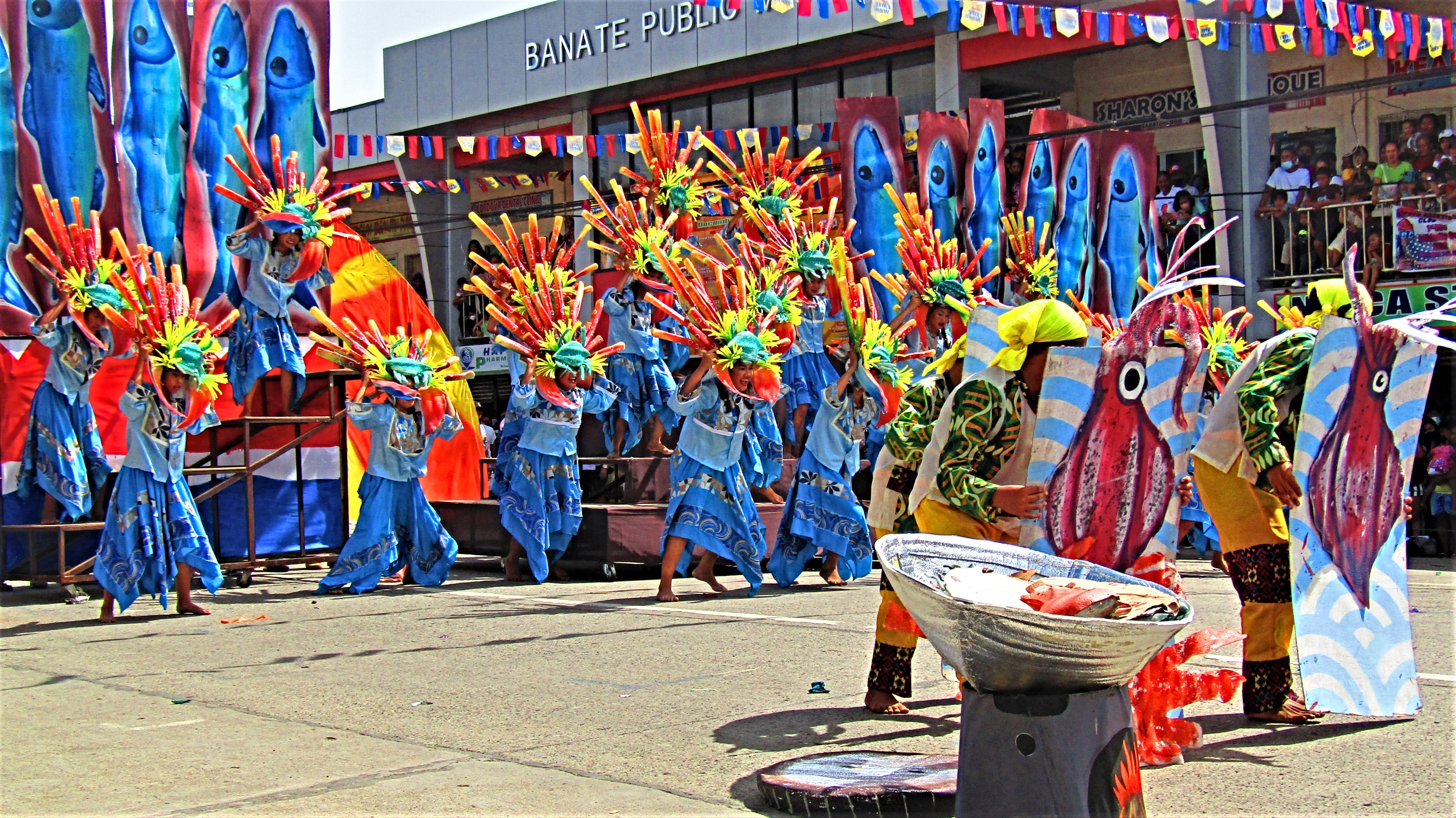
Members of "Tribu Kurusan" performed a dance number for the Kasag Festival Cultural Dance Drama 2022 championship in December of 2022.

For years, the Kasag festival came as an offshoot of the Annual Street Dancing Competition as the highlight of the Annual Town Fiesta, and the promotion of the town's famed product, the Blue Crabs (scientific name: Portunus Pelagicus which translates to “savory beautiful swimmer”), through as the Municipality's One Town One Product (OTOP) project. The idea of the Kasag Festival as a vessel for the promotion and marketing of the town product sprung from the OTOP Coordinator during the OTOP presentation at Passi City,

Previous Street Dancing Competitions were held every 24th of June, as one of the highlights of the final day of the Annual Town Fiesta honoring and thanking God through the intercession of St. John the Baptist for the fruitful year spent. However, the activities meant at integrating Kasag Festival with the Feast of St. John the Baptist proved to be such a tedious endeavor for Banatenhons, requiring much of their time and effort. Most often, this results in distractions, if not deviations, from the original essence and spirit of the religious fiesta which is about the devotion to St. John the Baptist and thanksgiving to the Almighty God.

With the implementation of the DTI's One Town One Product (OTOP), Banate identified Kasag (Blue Crab) as the prevalent and flourishing fishery-based industry thus making it Banate's OTOP. Promoting the new product and incorporating the product with the festival was conceptualized by the people in charge of OTOP.

==== Participation in Other Festivals ====
Selected Kasag performers regularly compete in other festivals. Banate is represented by Tribu Kasag in the Kasadyahan portion of the Dinagyang Festival every January in Iloilo City. The Kasag festival also competes in the Aliwan Fiesta held every April in Metro Manila. Both Tribu Kasag and the Kasag Festival have won several awards, including the Kasadyahan championship trophy in 2009 and 2010, and the second runner-up trophy at the Aliwan Fiesta in 2010.

Nota Bene: History of "Tribu Kasag" and its antecedent Tribes.

Since 1987, Banate has participated in the well-known Kasadyahan Festival which takes place before Iloilo City's Dinagyang Festival. Tribu Kasway has represented the town from the year 1987 to 1993. After then, from 1995 to 1999, the town changed the group's name to Tribu Hugyaw. They won 2nd Place in 1999. Tribu Panagat, the newly adapted name, was Kasadyan Festival's winning group in the year 2000. It continued to represent the town of Banate until 2003. From 2004 to 2005, the name "Tribu Hugyaw" was re-adapted by the group.

Later and until the present, "Tribu Kasag" represents Banate at the Dinagyang Festival as well as at other festivals in the Province of Iloilo and national competitions of the same kind. The current "cultural ambassadors of Banate" are known for their merry and lively dance which depicts the townpeople's livelihood as fishermen, and the town's famed product: "Kasag" or crab(s).

Awards (of Tribu Kasag):

- Kasadyahan Competition 2008 - 1st Runner-up, Best in Demonstration, Best in Choreography.
- Kasadyahan Competition 2009 - Grand Champion, Best in Production Design, Best in Choreography, Best in Performance.
- Aliwan Festival 2009 (National Competition)- 2nd Place.
- Kasadyahan Competition 2010 - Grand Champion, Best in Performance, Best in Choreography, Best in Music, Best in Costume.

== Government ==
=== List of former chief executives ===
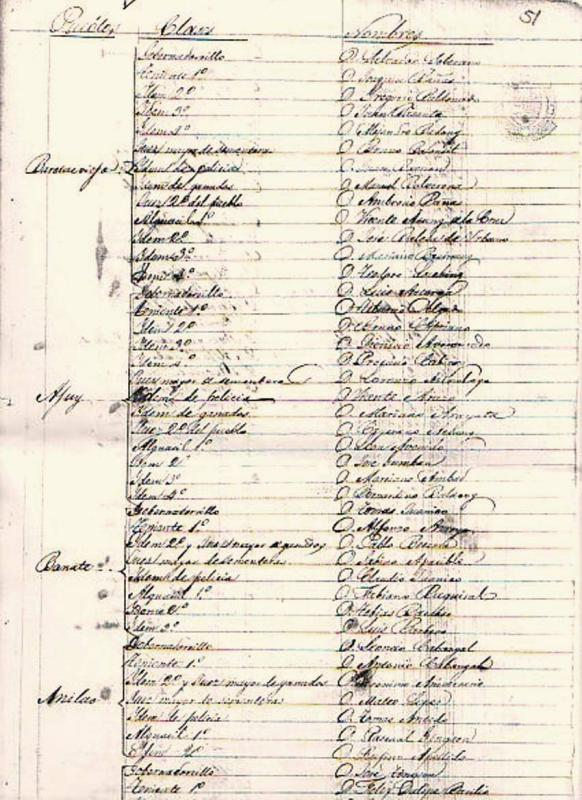
Record found in the National Archives in Manila showing the election of Don Tomas Juanico as Gobernadorcillo of Banate, whose name is written on the 17th line from the bottom.

Gobernadorcillos of Banate since 1837:

- Felix Baviera (1837)
- Alfonso Arroyo
- Eustaquio Fuentes
- Pasqual Baylon (1844–45)
- Ricardo Baban
- Tomas Juanico (1855–56)
- Apolinario Arroyo
- Mariano Fuentes
- Martin Balderas
- Nepomuceno Fuentes
- Apolinario Juanico
- Mateo Baban
- Julian Bactung
- Sotero Fuentes (1889–91)
- Feliciano Espinosa
- Ciriaco Fuentes (1898–1900) (Note: There was no agreement among sources as to who was the last Gobernadorcillo of Banate. Some say, the last Gobernadorcillo was Feliciano Espinosa. Others would say that it was Ciriaco Fuentes who was known to the inhabitants as Capitan Takong. However, no extant official records has been found so far to support these claims since the municipal archives was burnt by the Japanese soldiers during their occupation of the town in World War II.)

Presidents elected for Banate during the American regime:

- Eugenio Badilla (1901–03)
- Mauricio Tupas (1903–05)
- Florencio Villaluz (1905–07)
- Victorio Vargas (1907–09)
- Juanito Balleza (1910–12)
- Alejandro Baban (acting/appointed–1918)
- Felix Tarrosa (acting/appointed–1918)
- Elpidio Padilla (1918–20)
- Fernando Banaria(1921–23)
- Elpidio Baylen (1924–26)
- Paulo Badilla (1927–29)
- Fortunato Perez (1930–32)

Mayors of Banate during the U.S. commonwealth government:

- Manuel Bacabac (1933–35)
- Benjamin Buyco (1936–39), during whose term Anilao was separated from Banate. Afterwards, Benjamin Buyco also became the first Mayor of Anilao.
- Paulo Badilla (1939–40)

Mayors of Banate during the Japanese occupation and after the liberation:

- Exequiel Palec (1941)
- Simeon Balladares (1941–liberation)
- Exequiel Palec (liberation–1947) (Note: During the outbreak of World War II, the Provincial Governor of Iloilo, Tomas Confesor, appointed Simeon Balladares as Mayor. Consequently, Exequiel Palec was impeded to govern. However, he resumed his office as Mayor after the War.)

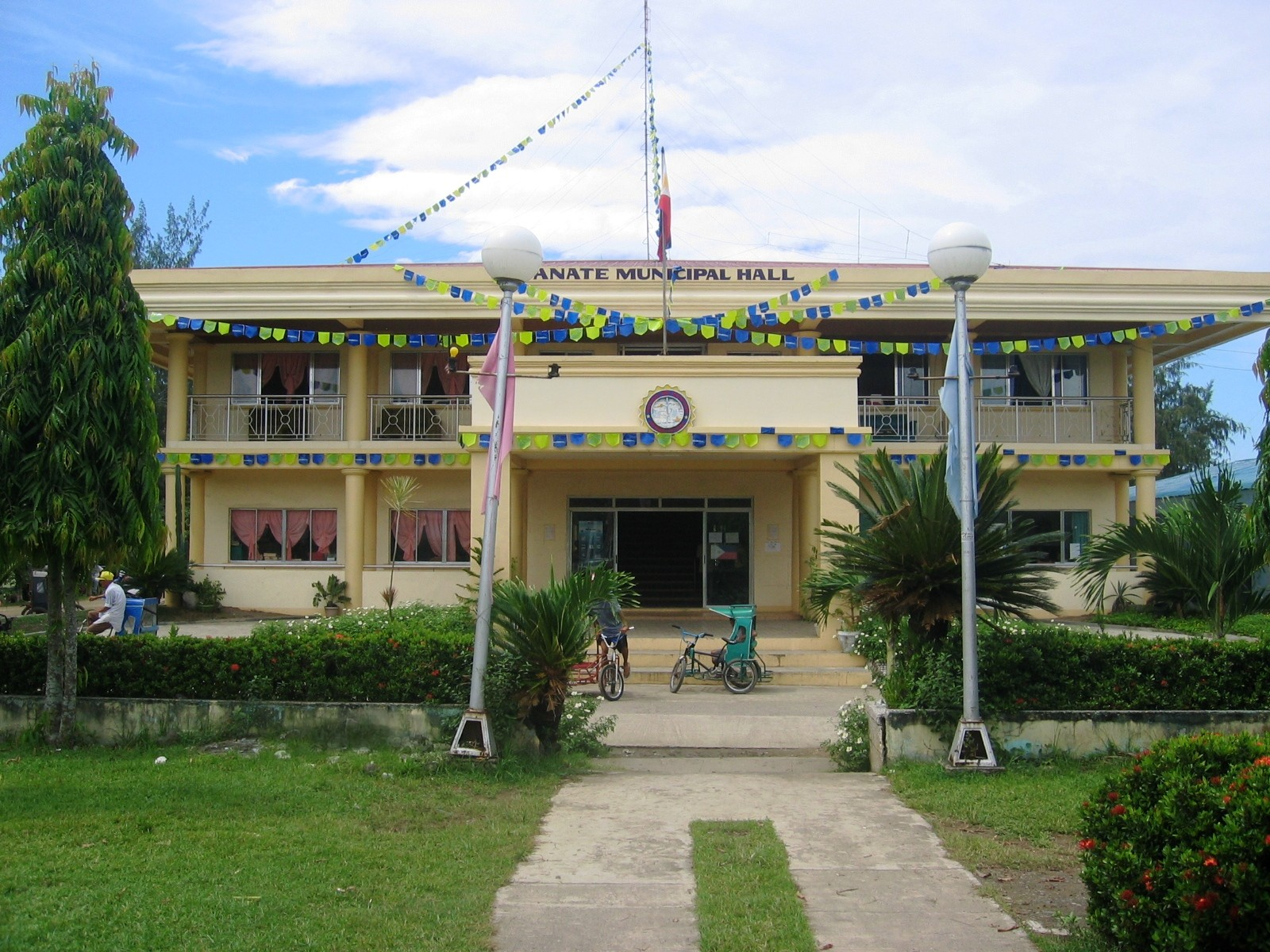
Banate Municipal Hall

Mayors of Banate during the time of the republic:

- Exequiel Palec (1948–51)
- Jose Babayo (1952–55)
- Nicolas Tarrosa (1955–59)
- Exequiel Palec (1959–63)
- Marcelino Bacabac (1964–67)
- Antonio T. Seyan (1968–82)
- Leonardo A. Cabangal (1982–86)
- Jonathan V. Sanico (1986–88) (Note: On November 6, 1986, after the EDSA I Revolution, President Corazon C. Aquino appointed Jonathan V. Sanico as Mayor of Banate.)
- Jonathan V. Sanico (1988–92)
- Vicente V. Bacos (1992–2001)
- Renerose B. Caborubias (1 July 2010–13 May 2013) (Note: Caborubias is the first female Mayor of Banate.)
- Carlos O. Cabangal, Jr. (2001–2010, 2013–2022)
- Peter Paul T. Gonzales (2022–present)

== Transportation ==
Banate has a port for boats that transport passengers and local products, like rice and bananas, to the island of Negros, which in turn, exports sugar and organic produce to this town.

=== Banate-Negros Occidental Bridge ===
On July 30, 2006, governors from 16 provinces of the Visayas met at the Provincial Capitol of Negros Occidental in Bacolod City to discuss the construction of bridges linking Panay, Negros, Cebu, Bohol, and Leyte. They call these bridges the Trans-Visayas Friendship Bridges. Among these bridges would be the Banate-Negros Occidental Bridge, which would link the Island of Negros to the Island of Panay. Located at the spot nearest to Negros, Banate is the most logical and ideal place for the construction of the connecting bridge between the two islands of the Visayas.

== Education ==
The Banate Schools District Office governs all educational institutions within the municipality. It oversees the management and operations of all private and public, from primary to secondary schools.

Primary and elementary schools

- Banate Baptist Church Learning Center
- Banate Central Elementary School
- Banate Integrated Learning Center
- Bobon Primary School
- Dugwakan Primary School
- F. S. Bactung Memorial Elementary School
- Iglesia Filipina Independiente Learning Center
- Insayawan Primary School
- Jose J. Bacaling Elementary School
- Kiddieland Home School & Tutorial Center
- Peace Baptist Learning Center of De La Paz
- Rufino A. Cabangal Memorial Elementary School
- San Salvador Elementary School
- Serafin Madrid Sr. Memorail Elementary School
- Simeon Balladares Memorial Elementary School
- St. John the Baptist Catholic Parish School
- Talokgangan Elementary School

Secondary schools

- Banate National High School
- De La Paz National High School
- Juanico Integrated School
- Libertad Integrated School
