= Population weighted density =

Alternate metric for population density

Example of the use of population-weighted density. Both regions are 9000 units in area total and have a population of 900 total. Each is divided into 9 parcels. The area-weighted densities are then both 0.10. However, the population weighted density of the first region is greater as its population is grouped in a single parcel.

Population-weighted density is an alternate metric for the population density of a region that attempts to measure the density as experienced by the average person who lives in the region.

Unlike conventional, or "area weighted" density, it is not changed when empty or extremely low-population areas are added to the region whose density is being computed.

== Formula and properties ==
Population-weighted density is generally computed by subdividing a region into parcels (alternately called "zones" or "subsets"), each with conventional density $d_i = \frac{p_i}{a_i}$. Then, a mean is computed, either arithmetically, as
$$d = \frac{\sum_i p_i d_i}{\sum_i p_i}$$
or geometrically, as
$$d = \exp\left(\frac{\sum_i p_i \ln d_i}{\sum_i p_i}\right)$$
Population-weighted density is equivalent to area-weighted density when the parcel is the entire region, and subdividing parcels can never reduce population-weighted density. As a result, population-weighted density is always at least as high as area-weighted density for a given region.

== History ==
Population-weighted density was introduced by John Craig of the UK Office of Population Censuses and Surveys in 1984. This paper introduced the formulas for computing mean population-weighted density both arithmetically and geometrically, and provided evidence that it differed from conventionally defined density. The paper also emphasized that what was provided was not a single definition but a family of definitions, dependent on the definition of a parcel. It argues that this is in fact a positive characteristic, as it "adds to the need to think about what the fundamental unit of density actually is." In addition, it describes the problems of selecting parcels that are too large or two small, and explains the property that smaller parcels lead to larger densities.

In 1998, Richardsun, Brunton, and Roddis rediscovered this technique, attempting to specifically prevent the problem of urban boundary definitions affecting density computations. Specifically, they characterize the problem as one of computing "perceived density" and provide the arithmetic mean version of the formula. They also analyze the relationship between parcel size and density value and find a linear relationship between density value and log parcel area across several different cities.

In more recent times, population-weighted density has been used in analysis in both scholarly and non-scholarly sources, such as analysis of wage inequality, epidemiology, and economics. The United States Census used population-weighted density in their 2012 report on patterns of metropolitan change, leading to an increase in the metric's popularity.

== Criticism ==
Population-weighted density's dependence on parcel size can often lead to criticism as lack of standardization can make population-weighted density difficult to compare across locales. Additionally, the choice of parcel to use is often poorly justified.

== See also ==
- Population density
- Urban density
