= Urban density =

Number of people inhabiting a given urbanized area

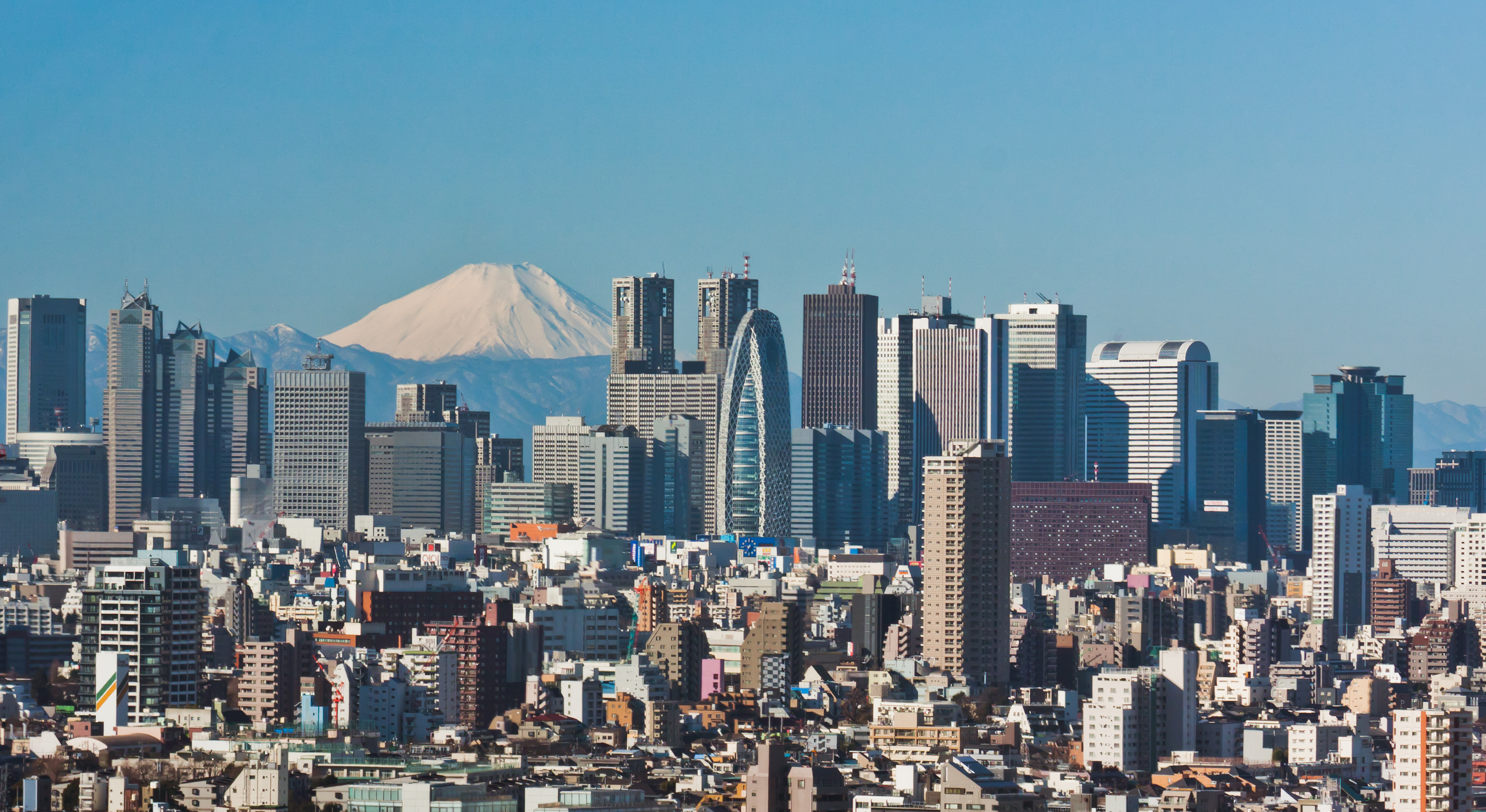
Shinjuku, Tokyo - estimated density of 19,170 people per km^2

Urban density is a concept used in urban planning, urban studies, and related fields to describe the intensity of people, jobs, housing units, total floor area of buildings, or some other measure of human occupation, activity, and development across a defined unit of area. In general terms, urban density describes the degree of concentration or compactness of people or development in a city. As such it is to be distinguished from other measures of population density. Urban density is considered an important factor in understanding how cities function. Research related to urban density occurs across diverse areas, including economics, health, innovation, psychology and geography as well as sustainability.

A 2019 meta-analysis of 180 studies on a vast number of economic outcomes of urban density concluded that urban density had net positive effects. However, there may be some regressive distributional effects.

== Measurement ==
Urban density is a very specific measurement of the population of an urbanized area, excluding non-urban land-uses. Non-urban uses include regional open space, agriculture and water-bodies.

There are a variety of other ways of measuring the density of urban areas:

- Population density - the number of human persons per unit area
  - Median density - a density metric which measures the density at which the average person lives. It is determined by ranking the census tracts by population density, and taking the density at which fifty percent of the population lives at a higher density and fifty percent lives at a lower density.
  - Population-weighted density - a density metric which measures the density at which the average person lives. It is determined by calculating the standard density of each census tract, assigning each a weight equal to its share of the total population, and then adding the segments.
- Residential density - the number of dwelling units in any given area
- Floor area ratio - the total floor area of buildings divided by land area of the lot upon which the buildings are built
- Employment density - the number of jobs in any given area
- Gross density - any density figure for a given area of land that includes uses not necessarily directly relevant to the figure (usually roads and other transport infrastructure)
- Net density - a density figure for a given area of land that excludes land not directly related to the figure.

== Sustainability ==
Empirical research has found associations between urban density and several measures of environmental sustainability, although these relationships vary depending on the measure and urban context. A study of household carbon footprints in the United States found lower average carbon footprints in urban cores than in surrounding suburbs, with the relationship between population density and household carbon footprints varying across levels of density. More recent research based on 276 Chinese cities found a significant negative relationship between population density and per-capita energy consumption. A systematic review found that 67% of the studies it examined reported a negative relationship between density and residential energy use, while also finding that the direction of this relationship varies according to methodological and contextual factors, including climate. In particular, higher density was associated with lower residential energy use in cold climates but not necessarily in temperate regions.

== See also ==
- Compact city
- List of cities proper by population density
- List of countries and dependencies by population density
- Smart growth
- Transportation planning
- Urban sprawl
- Urban vitality
- Verticalization
- Population-weighted density
