= Philippines campaign (1941–1942) =

Invasion of the Philippines by Japan during World War II

Battle of the Philippines
- Part of the Pacific War
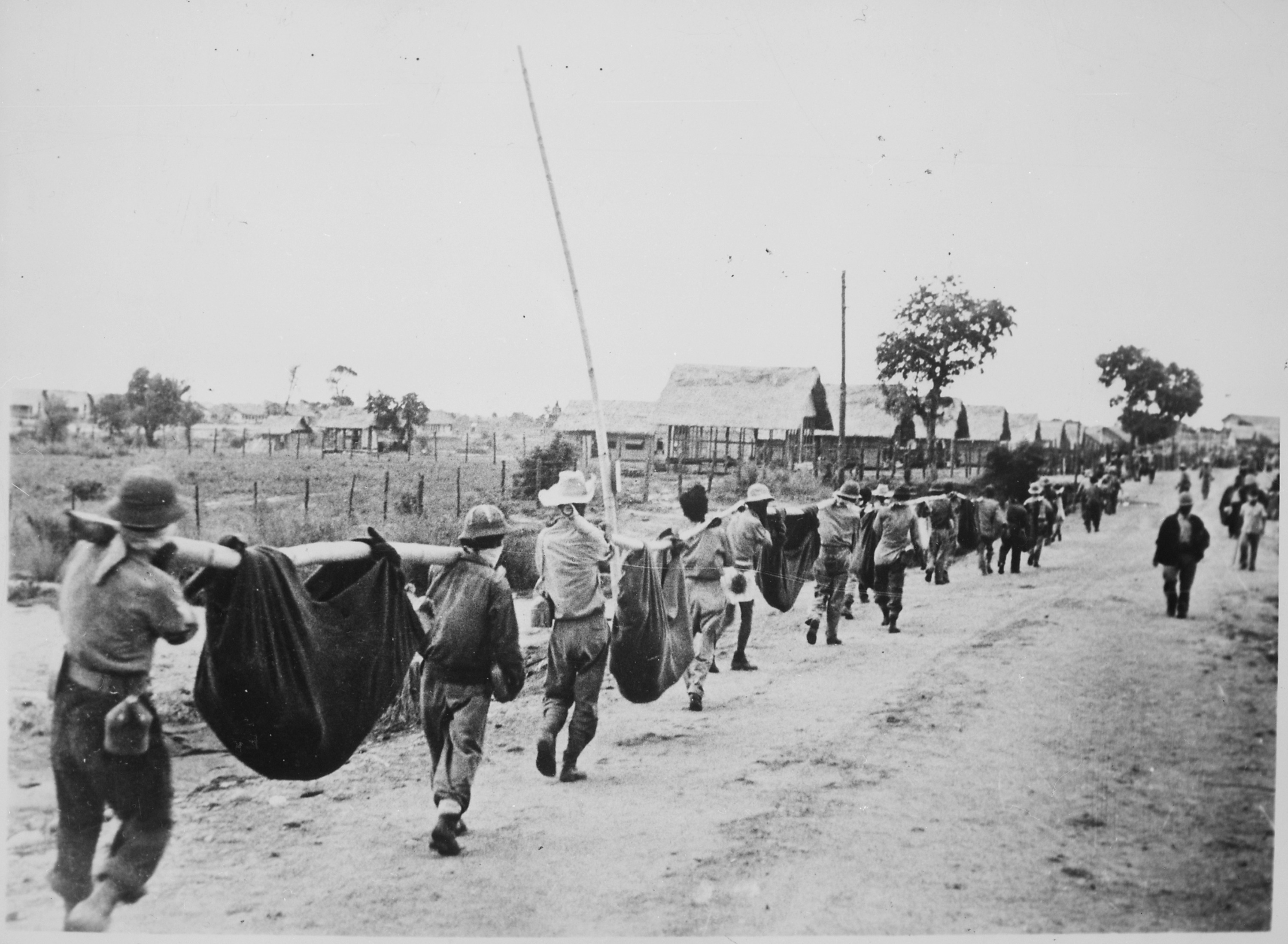
- A burial detail of American and Filipino prisoners of war uses improvised litters to carry fallen comrades at Camp O'Donnell, Capas, Tarlac, 1942, following the Bataan Death March.
Date	8 December 1941 – 8 May 1942
Location	Commonwealth of the Philippines
Result	Japanese victory
Territorial changes	Japanese occupation of the Philippines

Belligerents
Japan	United States: Philippine Commonwealth

Commanders and leaders
Hisaichi Terauchi; Masaharu Homma; Hideyoshi Obata; Ibō Takahashi; Nishizō Tsukahara	Douglas MacArthur; Jonathan Wainwright (surrendered); George Parker (surrendered); Manuel L. Quezon; Basilio J. Valdes

Strength
129,435 troops 90 tanks 541 aircraft	151,000 troops 108 tanks 277 aircraft

Casualties and losses
Japanese source: 11,225: 4,130 killed; 287 missing; 6,808 wounded; US estimate: 17,000–19,000: 7,000 killed or wounded; 10,000–12,000 dead of disease	146,000: 25,000 killed (Among which are 13,847 American military personnel); 21,000 wounded; 100,000 captured

The Philippines campaign, also known as the Battle of the Philippines (Filipino: Labanan sa Pilipinas) or the Fall of the Philippines, was the invasion of the Philippines by the Empire of Japan during the Pacific War and World War II. The operation to capture the islands, which was defended by the U.S. and Philippine Armies, was intended to prevent interference with Japan's expansion in Southeast Asia.

On 8 December 1941, several hours after the attack on Pearl Harbor, Japanese planes began bombing U.S. forces in the Philippines, including aircraft at Clark Field near the capital of Manila on the island of Luzon. Japanese landings on northern Luzon began two days later, and were followed on 22 December by major landings at Lingayen Gulf and Lamon Bay by the Japanese Fourteenth Army under Masaharu Homma. The defense of the Philippines was led by Douglas MacArthur, who ordered his soldiers to evacuate Manila to the Bataan Peninsula ahead of the Japanese advance. Japanese troops captured Manila by 7 January 1942, and after their failure to penetrate the Bataan defensive perimeter in early February, began a 40-day siege, enabled by a naval blockade of the islands. The U.S. and Philippine troops on Bataan eventually surrendered on 9 April and were then subjected to the Bataan Death March, which was marked by Japanese atrocities and mistreatment.

The campaign to capture the Philippines took much longer than planned by the Japanese, who in early January 1942 had decided to advance their timetable of operations in Borneo and Indonesia and withdraw their best division and the bulk of their airpower. This, coupled with the decision of MacArthur to withdraw U.S. and Philippine forces to Bataan, enabled the defenders to hold out for three months. The harbor and port facilities of Manila Bay were denied to the Japanese until the capture of Corregidor Island on 6 May. While offensive operations in the Dutch East Indies were unaffected, this heavily hindered operations in New Guinea and the Solomon Islands, buying time for the U.S. Navy to plan to engage the Japanese at Guadalcanal rather than much further east.

Japan's conquest of the Philippines is often considered the worst military defeat in U.S. history. About 23,000 U.S. military personnel and about 100,000 Filipino soldiers were killed or captured.

== Background ==
=== Japanese activity ===
==== Objectives ====
Japanese invasion plan for the Philippines, November 1941.

The Japanese planned to occupy the Philippines as part of their plan for a "Greater East Asia War" in which their Southern Expeditionary Army Group seized sources of raw materials in Malaya and the Netherlands East Indies while the Combined Fleet neutralized the United States Pacific Fleet. Five years earlier, in 1936, Captain Ishikawa Shingo, a hard-liner in the Imperial Japanese Navy, had toured the Philippines and other parts of the Southeast Asia, noting that these countries had raw materials Japan needed for its armed forces. This helped further increase their aspiration for colonizing the Philippines.

The Southern Expeditionary Army was created on 6 November 1941, commanded by General Hisaichi Terauchi, who had previously been minister of war. It was ordered to prepare for war in the event that negotiations with the United States did not succeed in peacefully meeting Japanese objectives. They also included the condition of America's acceptance of their position in the Pacific as a superior force, with the testament of their occupation of China, but they did not get what they wanted. Under Terauchi's command were four corps-equivalent armies, comprising ten divisions and three combined arms brigades, including the Japanese Fourteenth Area Army. Operations against the Philippines and Malaya were to be conducted simultaneously when Imperial General Headquarters ordered.

The invasion of the Philippines had four objectives:

- To prevent the use of the Philippines as an advance base of operations by American forces
- To acquire staging areas and supply bases to enhance operations against the Dutch East Indies and Guam
- To secure the lines of communication between occupied areas in the south and the Japanese Home Islands
- To limit the Allied intervention when they attempt to launch an offensive campaign in Australia and the Solomon Islands via dispatching all the forces stationed in the country and other neighboring nations

==== Invasion forces ====
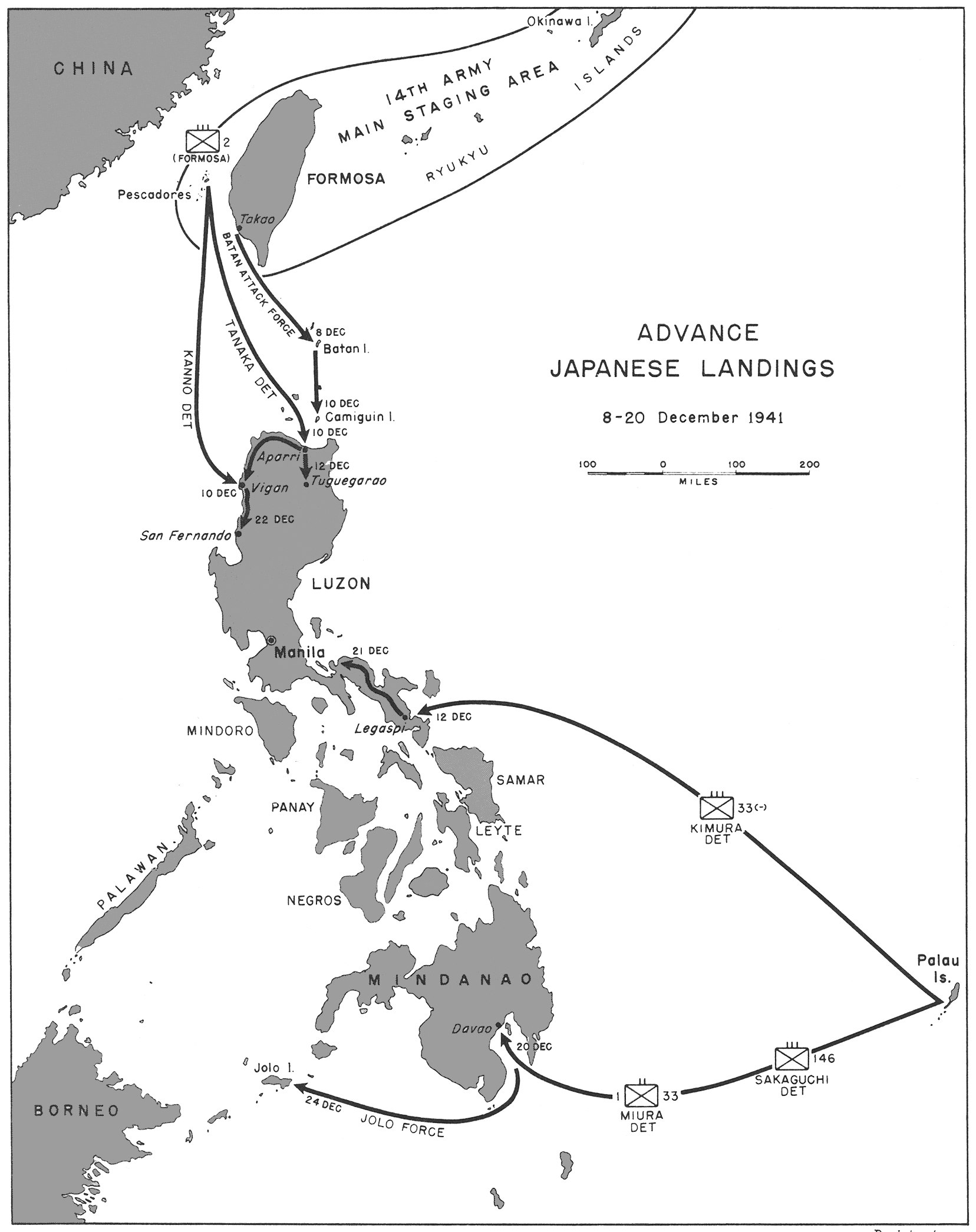
Advance Japanese landings in the Philippines 8–20 December 1941

Terauchi assigned the Philippines invasion to the 14th Army, under the command of Lieutenant General Masaharu Homma. Air support of ground operations was provided by the 5th Air Group, under Lieutenant General Hideyoshi Obata, which was transferred to Formosa from Manchuria. The amphibious invasion was conducted by the Philippines Force under Vice Admiral Ibō Takahashi, using the Third Fleet, supported by the land-based aircraft of 11th Air Fleet of Vice Admiral Nishizo Tsukahara.

The 14th Army had two first-line infantry divisions, the 16th (Susumu Morioka) and 48th Divisions (Yuitsu Tsuchihashi), to invade and conquer Luzon, and the 65th Brigade as a garrison force. The Formosa-based 48th Division, although without combat experience, was considered one of the Japanese Army's best units, was specially trained in amphibious operations, and was given the assignment of the main landing in Lingayen Gulf. The 16th Division, assigned to land at Lamon Bay, was picked as one of the best divisions still available in Japan and staged from the Ryukyus and Palau. The 14th Army also had the 4th and 7th Tank Regiments, five field artillery battalions, five anti-aircraft artillery battalions, four antitank companies, and a mortar battalion. An unusually strong group of combat engineer and bridging units was included in the 14th Army's support forces.

For the invasion, the Third Fleet was augmented by two destroyer squadrons and a cruiser division of the Second Fleet, and the aircraft carrier Ryūjō from the 1st Air Fleet. The Philippines Force consisted of an aircraft carrier, five heavy cruisers, five light cruisers, 29 destroyers, two seaplane tenders, minesweepers and torpedo boats.

Combined army and navy air strength allocated to support the landings was 541 aircraft. The 11th Kōkūkantai (Air Fleet) consisted of the 21st and 23rd Kōkūsentai (Air Flotillas), a combined strength of 156 G4M "Betty" and G3M "Nell" bombers, 107 A6M Zero fighters, plus seaplanes and reconnaissance planes. Most of these were based at Takao, and approximately a third were sent to Indochina in the last week of November to support operations in Malaya. The Ryujo provided an additional 16 fighters and 18 torpedo planes, and the surface ships had 68 seaplanes for search and observation, totaling 412 naval aircraft. The army's 5th Kikōshidan (Air Group) consisted of two fighter regiments, two light bomber regiments, and a heavy bomber regiment, totaling 192 aircraft: 76 Ki-21 "Sally", Ki-48 "Lily", and Ki-30 "Ann" bombers; 36 Ki-27 "Nate" fighters, and 19 Ki-15 "Babs" and Ki-36 "Ida" observation planes.

=== Defenses ===
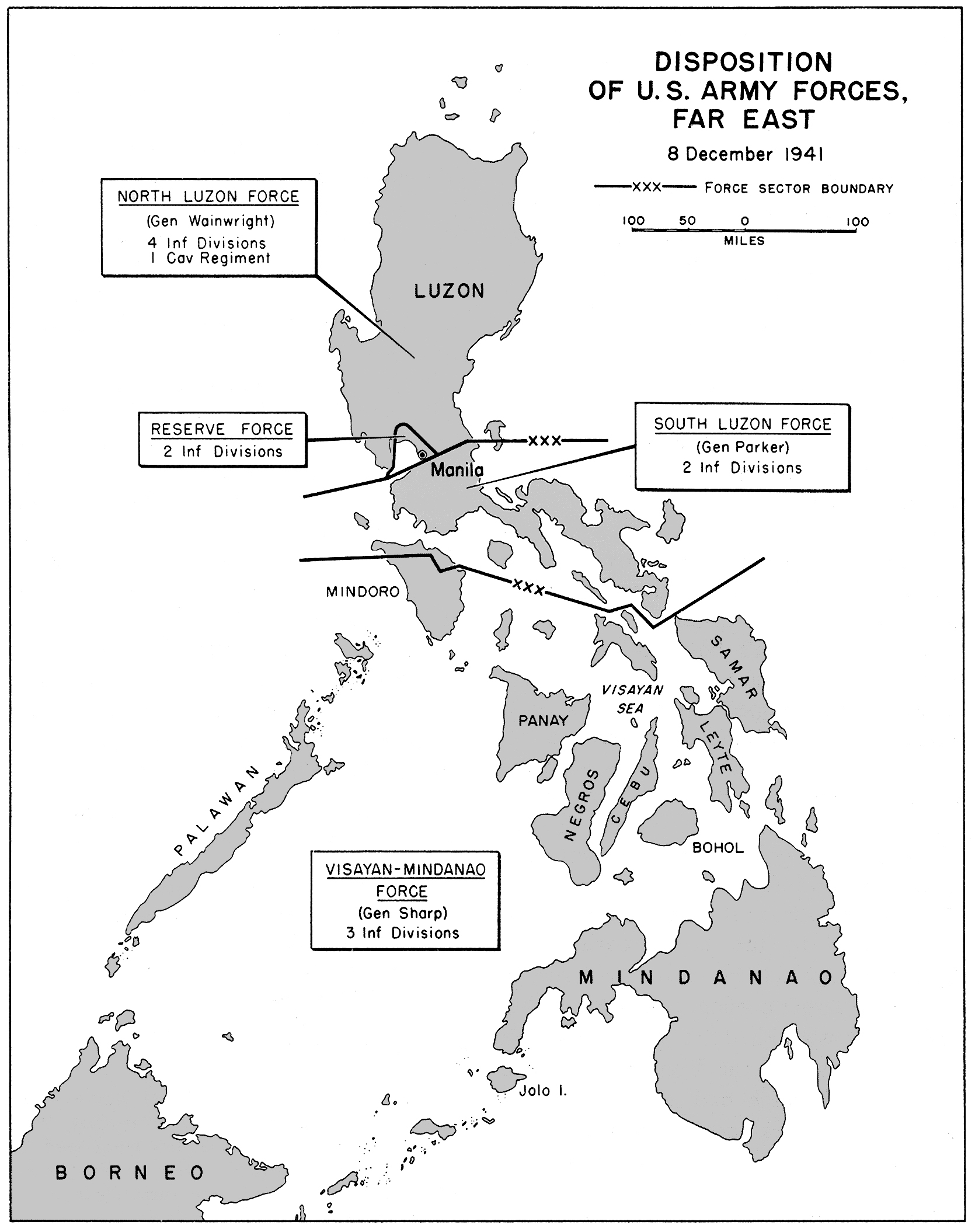
Disposition of United States Army forces in the Philippines in December 1941

==== United States Army Forces in the Far East ====
From mid-1941, following increased tension between Japan and several other powers, including the United States, Britain and the Netherlands, many countries in Southeast Asia and the Pacific began to prepare for the possibility of war. By December 1941, the combined defense forces in the Philippines were organized into the United States Army Forces in the Far East (USAFFE), which included the Philippine Army's 1st Regular Division, 2nd (Constabulary) Division, and 10 mobilized reserve divisions, and the United States Army's Philippine Department. General Douglas MacArthur was recalled from retirement by the War Department and named commander of USAFFE on 26 July 1941. MacArthur had retired in 1937 after two years as military advisor to the Philippine Commonwealth and accepted control of the Philippine Army, tasked by the Filipino government with reforming an army made up primarily of reservists lacking equipment, training and organization.

On 31 July 1941, the Philippine Department had 22,532 troops assigned, approximately half of them Filipino. MacArthur recommended the reassignment of department commander Major General George Grunert in October 1941 and took command himself. The main component of the department was the U.S. Army Philippine Division, a 10,500-man formation that consisted mostly of Philippine Scouts (PS) combat units. The Philippine Department had been reinforced between August and November 1941 by 8,500 troops of the U.S. Army Air Forces, and by three Army National Guard units, including its only armor, two battalions of M3 light tanks. These units, the 200th Coast Artillery Regiment (an antiaircraft unit), 192nd Tank Battalion, and 194th Tank Battalion, drew troops from New Mexico, Wisconsin, Illinois, Ohio, Kentucky, Minnesota, Missouri, and California. After reinforcement, the department's strength was 31,095, including 11,988 Philippine Scouts.

MacArthur organized USAFFE into four tactical commands. The North Luzon Force, under Maj. Gen. Jonathan M. Wainwright, defended the most likely sites for amphibious attacks and the central plains of Luzon. Wainwright's forces included the PA 11th, 21st and 31st Infantry Divisions, the U.S. 26th Cavalry Regiment (PS), a battalion of the 45th Infantry (PS), and the 1st Provisional Artillery Group of two batteries of 155 mm guns and one 2.95 inches (75 mm) mountain gun. The Philippine 71st Infantry Division served as a reserve and could be committed only on the authority of MacArthur.

The South Luzon Force, under Brigadier General George M. Parker Jr., controlled a zone east and south of Manila. Parker had the PA 41st and 51st Infantry Divisions and the 2nd Provisional Artillery Group of two batteries of the 86th Field Artillery Regiment (PS).

The Visayan–Mindanao Force under Brigadier General William F. Sharp comprised the PA 61st, 81st, and 101st Infantry Divisions, reinforced after the start of the war by the newly inducted 73rd and 93rd Infantry Regiments. The 61st Division was located on Panay, the 81st on Cebu and Negros, and the 101st on Mindanao. In January a fourth division, the 102nd, was created on Mindanao from the field artillery regiments of the 61st and 81st Divisions acting as infantry (they had no artillery pieces), and the 103rd Infantry of the 101st Division. The 2nd Infantry of the Philippine Army's 1st Regular Division and the 2nd Battalion of the U.S. 43rd Infantry (Philippine Scouts) were also made a part of the Mindanao Force.

USAFFE's Reserve Force, under MacArthur's direct control, was composed of the Philippine Division, the 91st Division (PA), and headquarters units from the PA and Philippine Department, positioned just north of Manila. The 192nd and 194th Tank Battalions formed the separate Provisional Tank Group, also under MacArthur's direct command, at Clark Field/Fort Stotsenburg, where they were positioned as a mobile defense against any attempt by airborne units to seize the field.

Four U.S. Coast Artillery Corps regiments guarded the entrance to Manila Bay, including Corregidor Island. Across a narrow 3 kilometres (1.9 miles) strait of water from Bataan on Corregidor was Fort Mills, defended by batteries of the 59th and 60th Coast Artillery Regiments (the latter an anti-aircraft unit), and the 91st and 92nd Coast Artillery Regiments (Philippine Scouts) of the Harbor Defenses of Manila and Subic Bays. The 59th CA acted as a supervisory unit for the batteries of all units positioned on Forts Hughes, Drum, Frank, and Wint. The majority of the forts had been built circa 1910–1915 and, except for Fort Drum and Battery Monja on Corregidor, were unprotected against air and high-angle artillery attack except by camouflage.

The USAFFE's aviation arm was the Far East Air Force (FEAF) of the U.S. Army Air Forces, commanded by Major General Lewis H. Brereton. Previously the Philippine Department Air Force and Air Force USAFFE, the air force was the largest USAAF combat air organization outside the United States. Its primary combat power consisted of 91 serviceable P-40 Warhawk fighters and 34 B-17 Flying Fortress bombers. Tactically the FEAF was part of the Reserve Force, so that it fell under MacArthur's direct command.

As of 30 November 1941 the strength of U.S. Army troops in the Philippines, including Philippine units, was 31,095, consisting of 2,504 officers and 28,591 enlisted (16,643 Americans and 11,957 Philippine Scouts).

==== Mobilization ====
MacArthur's mobilization plans called for induction of the ten reserve divisions between 1 September and 15 December 1941. The timetable was met on 1 September with the induction of one regiment per division but slowed as a lack of facilities and equipment hampered training. The second regiments of the divisions were not called up until 1 November, and the third regiments were not organized until after hostilities began. Training was also seriously inhibited by language difficulties between the American cadres and the Filipino troops, and by the many differing dialects (estimated at 70) of the numerous ethnic groups comprising the army. By the outbreak of war, only two-thirds of the army had been mobilized, but additions to the force continued with the induction of the Constabulary and a portion of the regular army, until a force of approximately 130,000 men was reached.

The most crucial equipment shortfalls were in rifles and divisional light artillery. MacArthur requested 84,500 M1 Garand rifles to replace the World War I M1917 Enfields equipping the PA, of which there were adequate numbers, but the War Department denied the request because of production difficulties. The divisions had only 20% of their artillery requirements, and while plans had been approved to significantly reduce this gap, the arrangements came too late to be implemented before war isolated the Philippines.

By contrast, the Philippine Division was adequately manned, equipped, and trained. MacArthur received immediate approval to modernize it by reorganizing it as a mobile "triangular" division. Increasing the authorized size of the Philippine Scouts was not politically viable (because of resentments within the less-well-paid Philippine Army), so MacArthur's plan also provided for freeing up Philippine Scouts to round out other units. The transfer of the American 34th Infantry from the 8th Infantry Division in the United States to the Philippine Division, accompanied by two field artillery battalions to create a pair of complete regimental combat teams, was actually underway when war broke out. The deployment ended with the troops still in the United States, where they were sent to defend Hawaii instead.

==== Other defense forces ====
The United States Asiatic Fleet and 16th Naval District, based at Manila, provided the naval defenses for the Philippines. Commanded by Admiral Thomas C. Hart, the surface combatants of the Asiatic Fleet were the heavy cruiser USS Houston, the light cruiser USS Marblehead, and thirteen World War I-era destroyers. Its primary striking power lay in the 23 modern submarines assigned to the Asiatic Fleet. Submarine Squadron (SUBRON) Two consisted of 6 Salmon-class submarines, and SUBRON Five of 11 Porpoise and Sargo-class submarines. In September 1941, naval patrol forces in the Philippines were augmented by the arrival of the six PT boats of Motor Torpedo Boat Squadron Three. Likewise, the China Yangtze Patrol gunboats also became part of the Philippine naval defenses: USS Asheville, USS Mindanao, USS Luzon, USS Oahu, and USS Quail. In December 1941, the naval forces were augmented by the schooner USS Lanikai.

The U.S. 4th Marine Regiment, stationed in Shanghai since the late 1920s, had anticipated a withdrawal from China during the summer of 1941. As personnel were routinely transferred back to the United States or separated from the service, the regimental commander, Colonel Samuel L. Howard, arranged unofficially for all replacements to be placed in the 1st Special Defense Battalion, based at Cavite. When the 4th Marines arrived in the Philippines on 30 November 1941, it incorporated the Marines at Cavite and Olongapo Naval Stations into its understrength ranks. An initial plan to divide the 4th into two regiments, mixing each with a battalion of Philippine Constabulary, was discarded after Howard showed reluctance, and the 4th was stationed on Corregidor to augment the defenses there, with details detached to Bataan to protect USAFFE headquarters.

Additionally the United States Coast and Geodetic Survey, a paramilitary survey force, operated in Manila with the ship USC&GSS Research.

== Attack on Clark Field ==
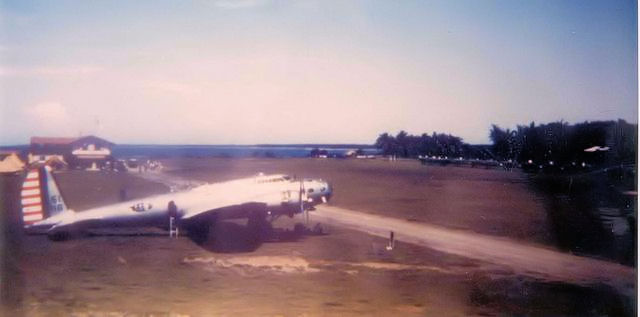
B-17 at Iba Field in October 1941

News reached the Philippines that an attack on Pearl Harbor was in progress at 02:20 local time on 8 December 1941. FEAF interceptors had already conducted an air search for incoming aircraft reported shortly after midnight, but these had been Japanese scout planes reporting weather conditions. At 03:30, Brigadier General Richard Sutherland, chief of staff to MacArthur, heard about the attack from a commercial radio broadcast. At 05:00 Brereton reported to USAFFE headquarters where he attempted to see MacArthur without success. He recommended to Sutherland that FEAF launch bombing missions against Formosa in accordance with Rainbow 5 war plan directives from which an attack was likely to come. Brereton was further made aware of an attack against the USS William B. Preston at Davao Bay. Authorization was withheld, but shortly afterward, in response to a telegram from General George C. Marshall instructing MacArthur to implement Rainbow 5, Brereton was ordered to have a strike in readiness for later approval.

Through a series of disputed discussions and decisions, authorization for the first raid was not approved until 10:15 for an attack just before sunset, with a follow-up raid at dawn the next day. In the meantime, Japanese plans to attack Clark and Iba Fields using land-based naval bombers and Zero fighters were delayed six hours by fog at its Formosa bases, so that only a small scale Japanese Army mission attacked targets in the northern tip of Luzon. At 08:00, Brereton received a telephone call from General Henry H. Arnold warning him not to allow his aircraft to be attacked while still on the ground. FEAF launched three squadron-sized fighter patrols and all of its serviceable bombers on Luzon between 08:00 and 08:30 as a precautionary move. After MacArthur gave Brereton authorization for an air strike, the bombers were ordered to land and prepare for the afternoon raid on Formosa. All three pursuit squadrons began to run short on fuel and broke off their patrols at the same time.

The 20th Pursuit Squadron's Curtiss P-40B interceptors patrolled the area while the bombers landed at Clark Field between 10:30 and 10:45, then dispersed to their revetments for servicing. The 17th Pursuit Squadron, based at Nichols Field, also landed at Clark and had its aircraft refueled while its pilots ate lunch, then put its pilots on alert shortly after 11:00. All but two of the Clark Field B-17s were on the ground.

At 11:27 and 11:29, the radar post at Iba Field detected two incoming raids while the closest was still 130 miles out. It alerted FEAF headquarters and the command post at Clark Field, a warning that reached only the pursuit group commander, Major Orrin L. Grover, who apparently became confused by multiple and conflicting reports. The 3rd Pursuit Squadron took off from Iba at 11:45 with instructions to intercept the western force, which was thought to have Manila as its target, but dust problems during its takeoff resulted in the fragmentation of its flights. Two flights of the 21st Pursuit Squadron (PS) at Nichols Field, six P-40Es, took off at 11:45, led by 1st Lt. William Dyess. They started for Clark but were diverted to Manila Bay as a second line of defense if the 3rd PS failed to intercept its force. The 21st's third flight, taking off five minutes later, headed toward Clark, although engine problems with its new P-40Es reduced its numbers by two. The 17th Pursuit Squadron took off at 12:15 from Clark, ordered to patrol Bataan and Manila Bay, while the 34th PS at Del Carmen never received its orders to protect Clark Field and did not launch. The 20th PS, dispersed at Clark, was ready to take off but did not receive orders from group headquarters. Instead a line chief saw the incoming formation of Japanese bombers and the section commander, 1st Lt. Joseph H. Moore, ordered the scramble himself.

Even though tracked by radar and with three U.S. pursuit squadrons in the air, when Japanese bombers of the 11th Kōkūkantai attacked Clark Field at 12:40, they achieved tactical surprise. Two squadrons of B-17s were dispersed on the ground. Most of the P-40s of the 20th PS were preparing to taxi and were struck by the first wave of 27 Japanese "Nell" bombers; only four of the 20th PS P-40Bs managed to take off as the bombs were falling.

A second bomber attack (26 "Betty" bombers) followed closely, then escorting Zero fighters strafed the field for 30 minutes, destroying 12 of the 17 American heavy bombers present and seriously damaging three others. Two damaged B-17s were made flyable and taken to Mindanao, where one of them was destroyed in a ground collision. A near-simultaneous attack on the auxiliary field at Iba to the northwest by 54 "Betty" bombers was also successful: all but four of the 3rd Pursuit Squadron's P-40s, short on fuel and caught in their landing pattern, were destroyed in combat or by lack of fuel. Twelve P-40s from the 20th (four), 21st (two), and 3rd (six) Squadrons attacked the strafers but with little success, losing at least four of their own.

The FEAF lost half its planes in the 45-minute attack and was all but destroyed over the next few days, including a number of the surviving B-17s lost to takeoff crashes of other planes. The 24th Pursuit Group flew its last interception on 10 December, losing 11 of the 40 or so P-40s it sent up, and the surviving P-35s of the 34th PS were destroyed on the ground at Del Carmen. That night FEAF combat strength had been reduced to 12 operable B-17s, 22 P-40s, and 8 P-35s. Fighter strength fluctuated daily until 24 December, when USAFFE ordered all its forces into Bataan. Until then P-40s and P-35s were cobbled together from spare parts taken from wrecked airplanes, and still crated P-40Es were assembled at the Philippine Air Depot. Clark Field was abandoned as a bomber field on 11 December after being used as a staging base for a handful of B-17 missions. Between 17 and 20 December, the 14 surviving B-17s were withdrawn to Australia. Every other aircraft of the FEAF was destroyed or captured.

=== Aftermath ===
No formal investigation took place regarding this failure as it occurred in the aftermath of Pearl Harbor. After the war, Brereton and Sutherland in effect blamed each other for FEAF being surprised on the ground, and MacArthur released a statement that he had no knowledge of any recommendation to attack Formosa with B-17s. Walter D. Edmunds summarizes the disaster: "in the Philippines the personnel of our armed forces almost without exception failed to assess accurately the weight, speed, and efficiency of the Japanese Air Force." He quotes Major General Emmett O'Donnell Jr., then a major in charge of the B-17s sent to Mindanao, as concluding that the first day was a "disorganized business" and that no one was "really at fault" because no one was "geared for war." The attitude is not inline with his superiors, the United States Secretary of War Stimson's recommendation was that, "all practical steps should be taken to increase the defensive strength of the Philippines." as noted in the book With Courage: The U.S. Army Air Forces in World War II. MacArthur was supposed to get the Philippines ready to resist a Japanese invasion if it came, however he was only recalled to duty in July 1941 and while many new pilots were being trained the aircraft were fast becoming obsolete compared to the latest generation of Japanese aircraft.

== Invasion ==
=== Initial landings, 8 December 1941 ===
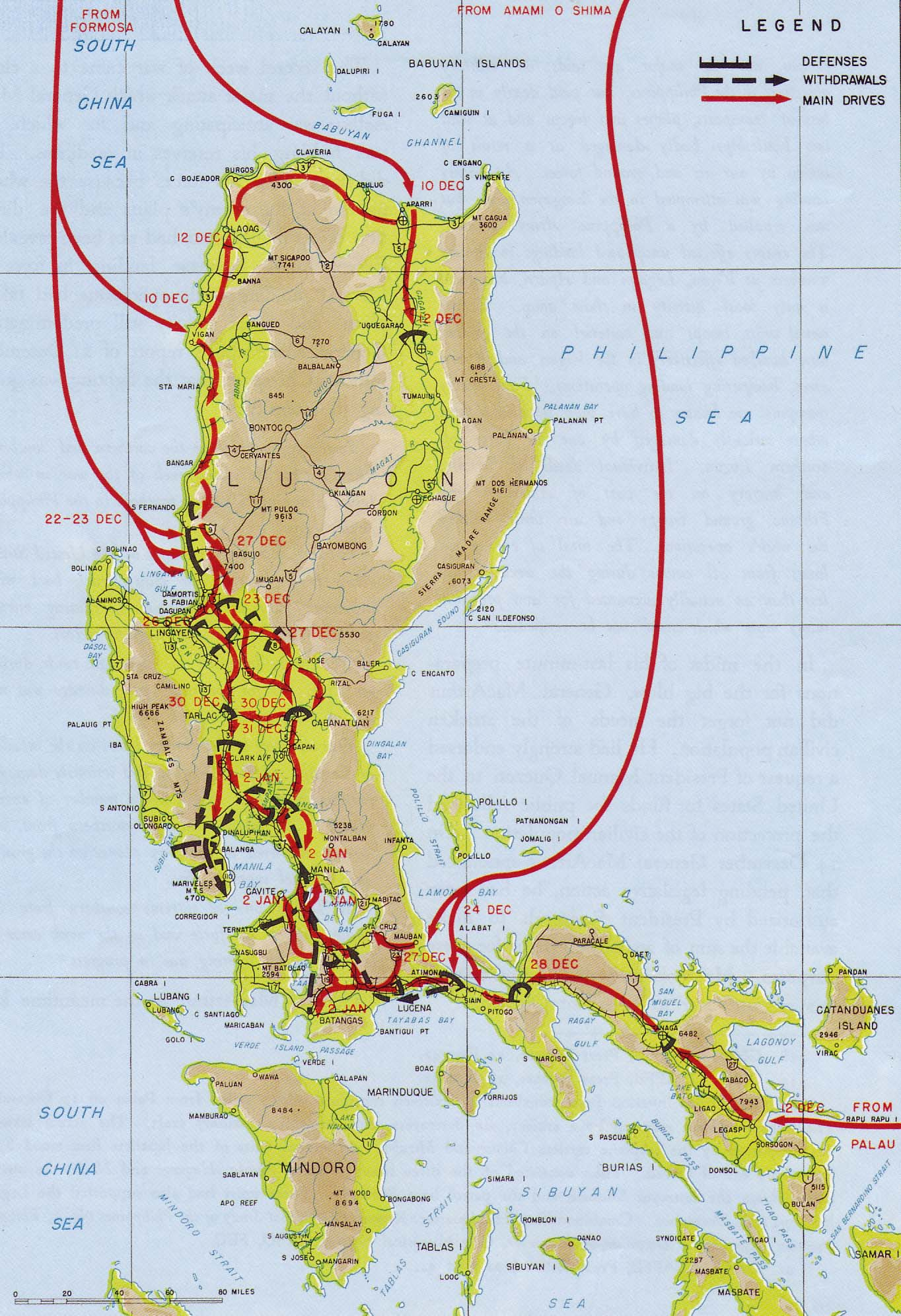
Japanese operations on Luzon in December 1941.

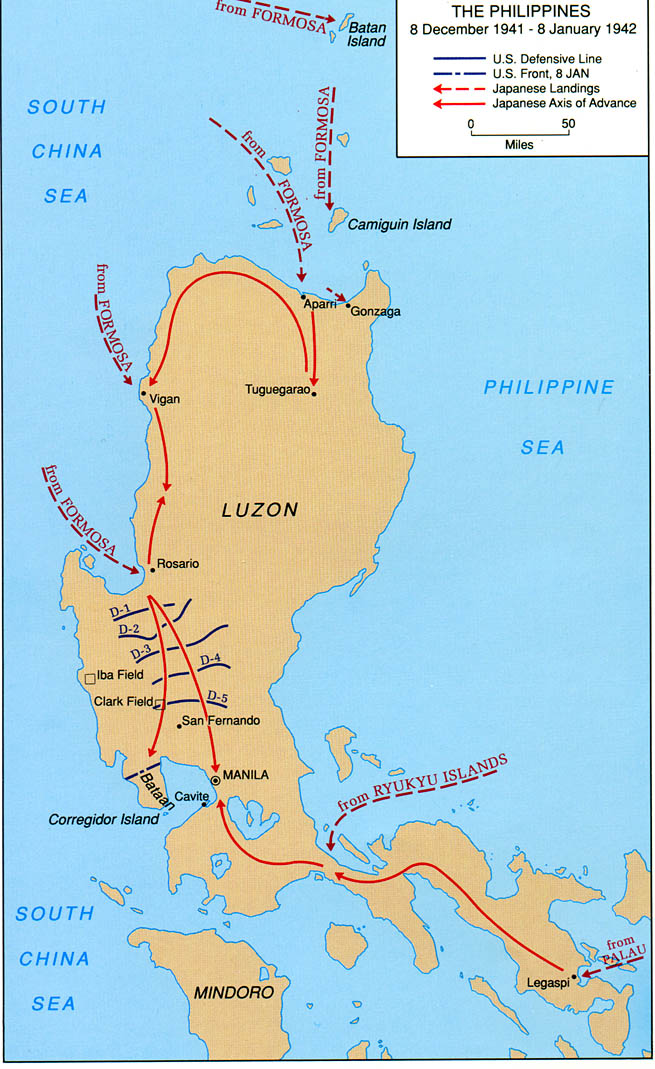
A map of Luzon Island showing Japanese landings and advances from 8 December 1941 to 8 January 1942

The Japanese 14th Army began its invasion with a landing on Batan Island (not to be confused with Bataan Peninsula), 120 miles (190 km) off the north coast of Luzon, on 8 December 1941 by selected naval infantry units. Landings on Camiguin Island and at Vigan, Aparri, and Gonzaga in northern Luzon followed two days later.

Two B-17s attacked the Japanese ships offloading at Gonzaga. Other B-17s with fighter escort attacked the landings at Vigan. In this last coordinated action of the Far East Air Force, U.S. planes damaged two Japanese transports (Oigawa Maru and Takao Maru), the cruiser Naka, and the destroyer Murasame, and sank minesweeper W-10.

Early on the morning of 12 December the Japanese landed 2,500 men of the 16th Division at Legazpi on southern Luzon, 150 miles (240 km) from the nearest American and Philippine forces. The attack on Mindanao followed on 19 December using elements of the 16th Army temporarily attached to the invasion force to permit the 14th Army to use all its troops on Luzon.

Meanwhile, Hart withdrew most of his U.S. Asiatic Fleet from Philippine waters following Japanese air strikes that inflicted heavy damage on U.S. naval facilities at Cavite on 10 December. Only submarines were left to contest Japanese naval superiority, and the commanders of these, conditioned by prewar doctrine that held the fleet submarine to be a scouting vessel more vulnerable to air and anti-submarine attack than it actually was, proved unequal to the task. Because of this poor doctrine for submarine warfare and the infamous failures of the Mark 14 torpedo that plagued the U.S. submarine fleet for the first two years of the Pacific War, not a single Japanese warship was sunk by the Asiatic Fleet during the Philippines campaign.

James Leutze writes:

He had 27 subs submerged in Manila Bay,... it was Washington, not the Asiatic Fleet Commander that directed the fleet to withdraw from Manila.... Hart was directed by Washington to send US Navy surface forces and submarines southeast toward Australia.... Douglas MacArthur and Henry Stimson (United States Secretary of War) feuding with Admiral Hart over lack of US Navy submarine action. MacArthur asked Admiral Hart: "What in the world is the matter with your submarines?"... MacArthur complained that Hart's inactivity allowed Japan's navy freedom of action.... According to Stimson, MacArthur felt that Hart's ships and submarines were ineffectual, but because Admiral Hart had lost his courage. Admiral Hart's reaction to MacArthur's brickbats: "He (MacArthur) is inclined to cut my throat and perhaps the Navy in general."

=== Main attack, 22 December 1941 ===
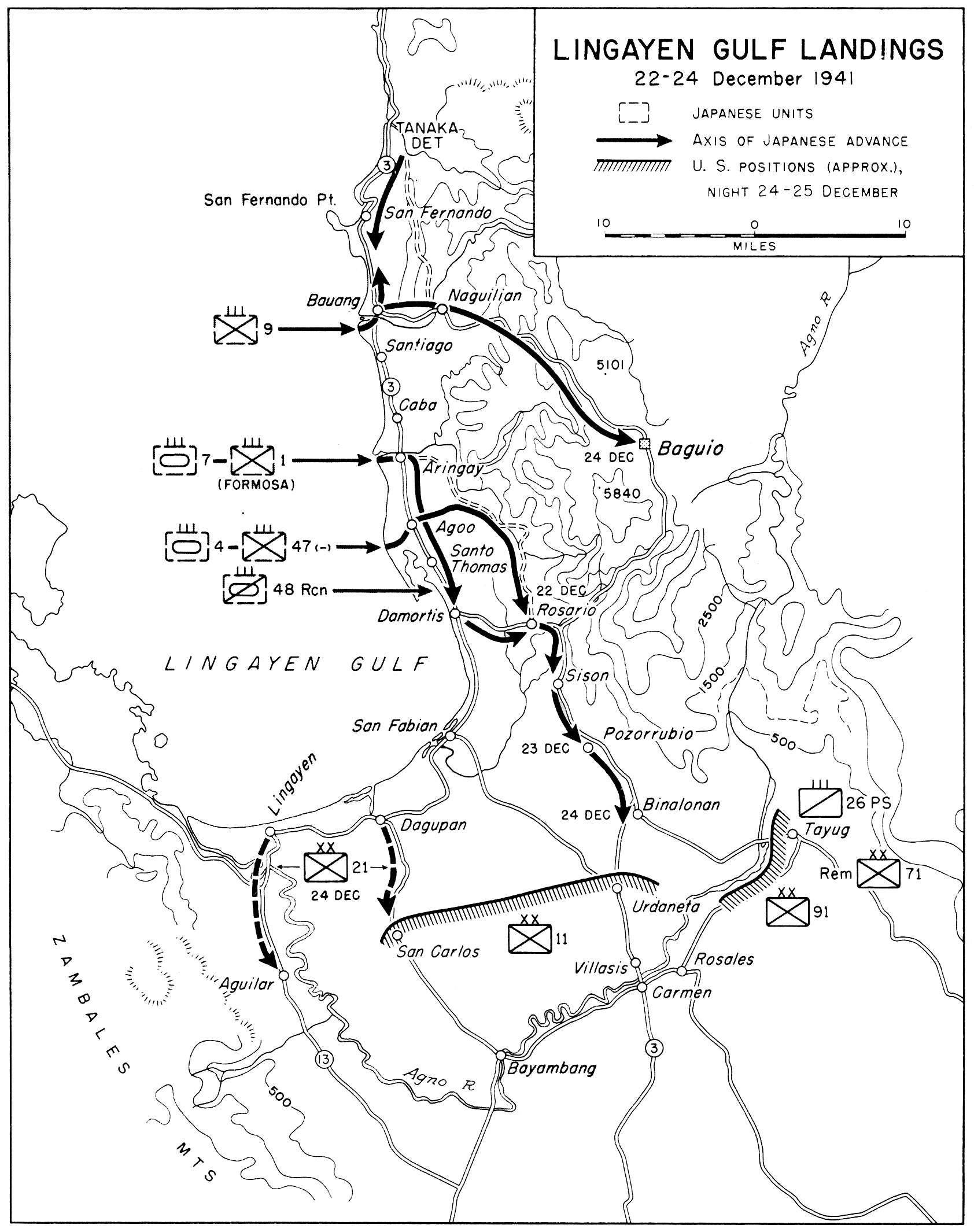
Japanese landings and advance at Lingayen Gulf, 22–24 December 1941.

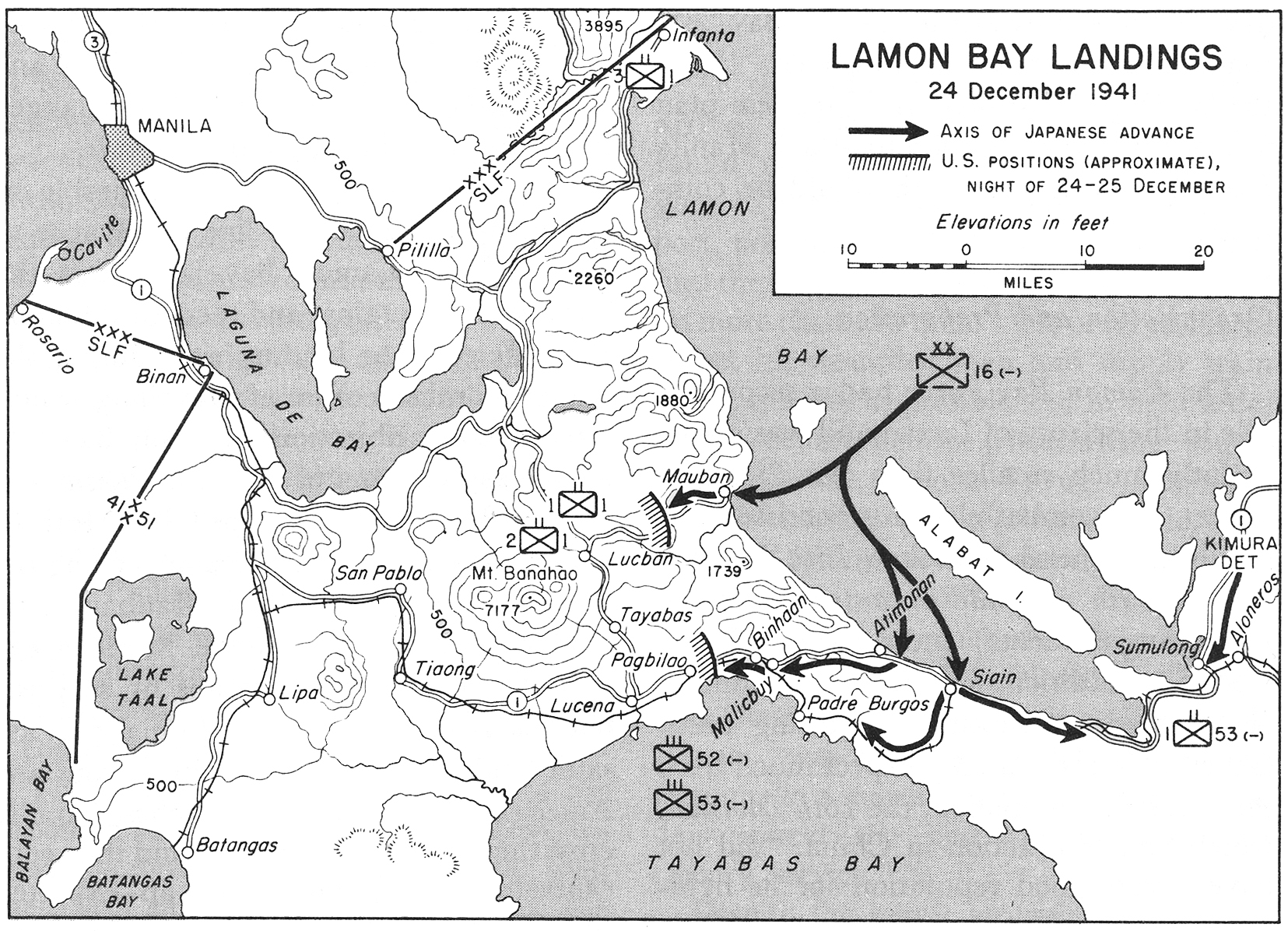
Japanese landings at Lamon Bay in December 1941.

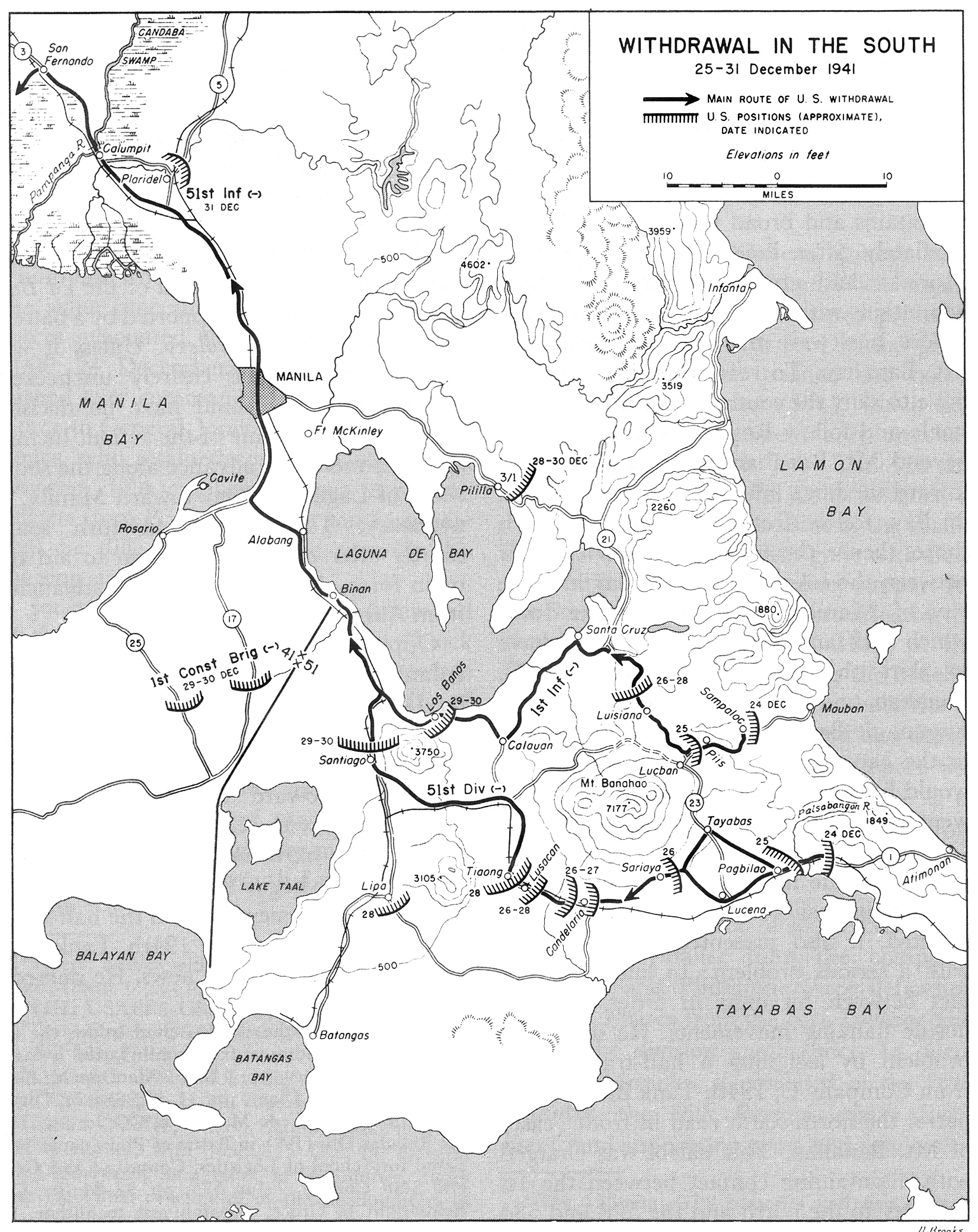
Withdrawal in the south, 25–31 December 1941

The main attack began early on the morning of 22 December as 43,110 men of the 48th Division and one regiment of the 16th Division, supported by artillery and approximately 90 tanks, landed at the three towns of Agoo, Caba, and Bauang in La Union, along the east coast of Lingayen Gulf. A few B-17s flying from Australia attacked the invasion fleet and U.S. submarines harassed it from the adjacent waters, but to little effect.

General Wainwright's poorly trained and equipped 11th and 71st Divisions could neither repel the landings nor pin the enemy on the beaches. The remaining Japanese units of the divisions landed farther south along the gulf. The 26th Cavalry (PS) of the well-trained and better-equipped Philippine Scouts, advancing to meet them, put up a strong fight at Rosario but was forced to withdraw after taking heavy casualties with no hope of sufficient reinforcements. By nightfall on 23 December the Japanese had moved ten miles (16 km) into the interior.

The next day, 7,000 men of the 16th Division hit the beaches at three locations along the shore of Lamon Bay in southern Luzon, where they found General Parker's forces dispersed and without artillery protecting the eastern coast, unable to offer serious resistance. They consolidated their positions and began the drive north toward Manila where they would link up with the forces advancing south toward the capital.

=== Withdrawal into Bataan, 24 December 1941 to 6 January 1942 ===
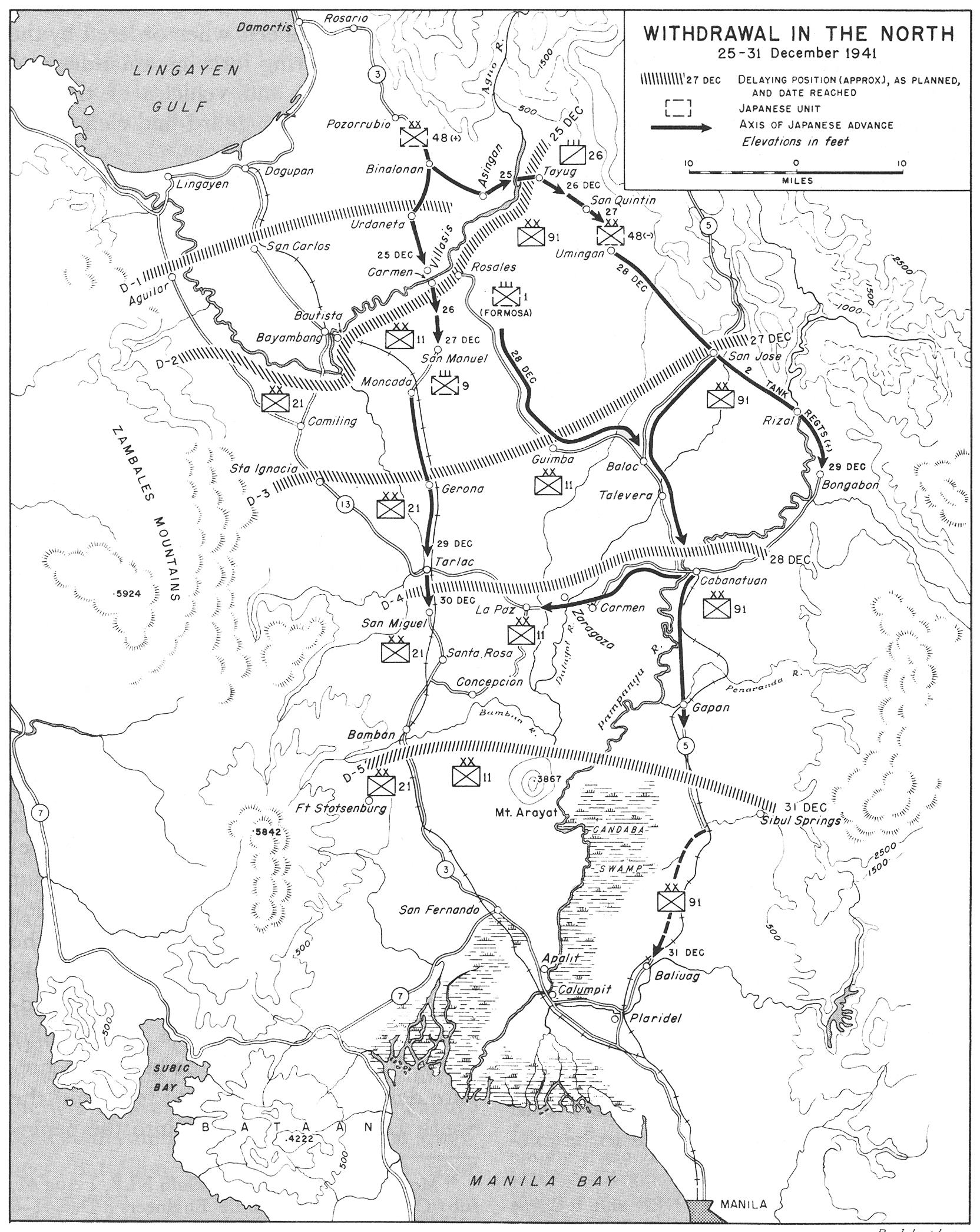
Withdrawal of American and Filipino forces in northern Luzon, December 1941.

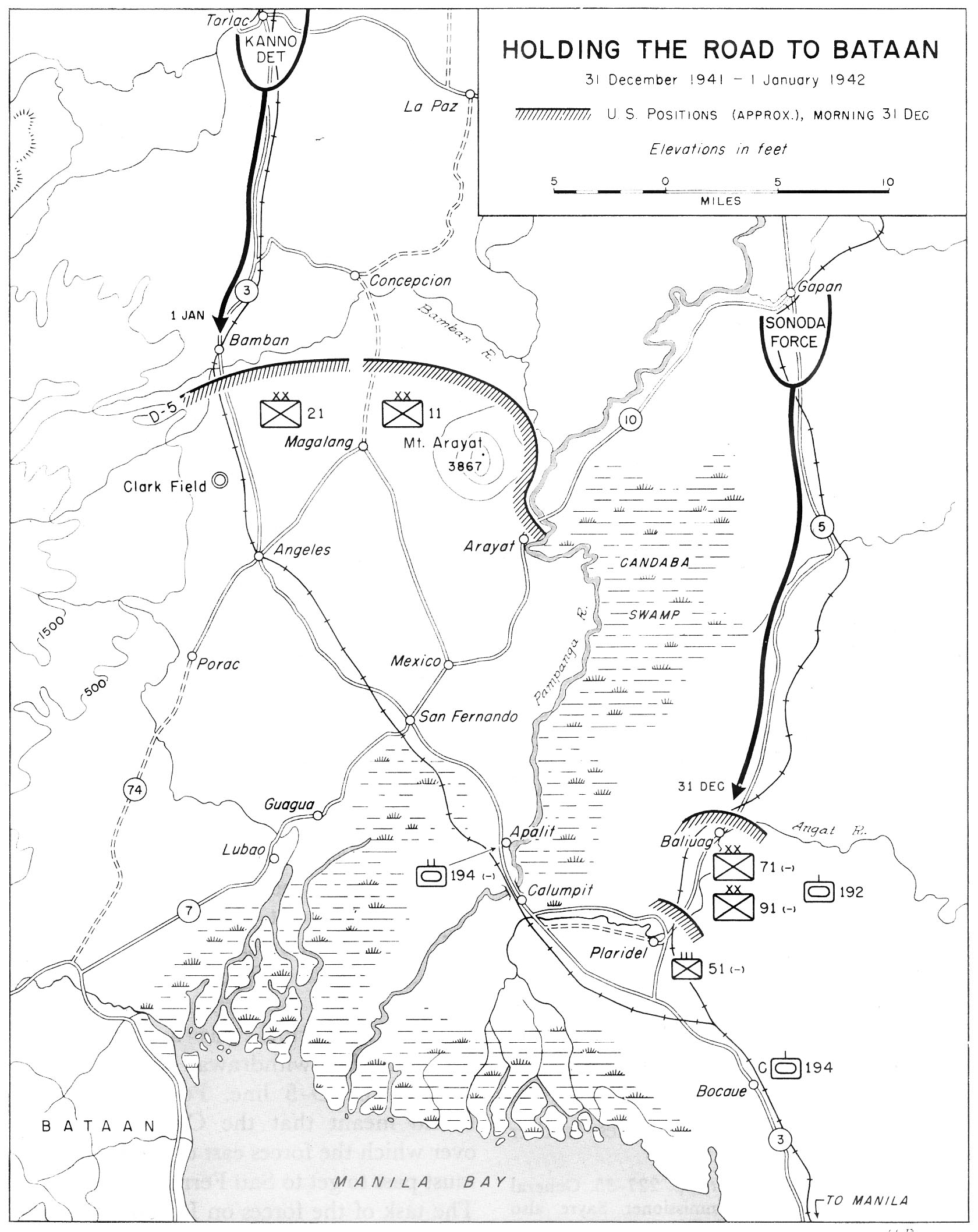
Defensive actions covering the road to Bataan in January 1942.

The U.S. Philippine Division moved into the field in reaction to reports of airborne drops near Clark Field, and when this proved false they were deployed to cover the withdrawal of troops into Bataan and to resist Japanese advances in the Subic Bay area.

On 24 December, MacArthur invoked the prewar plan Orange 3, which called for use of five delaying positions in central Luzon while forces withdrew into Bataan. This was carried out in part by the 26th Cavalry Regiment. He relieved Parker of his command of South Luzon Force and had him begin preparing defensive positions on Bataan, using units as they arrived; both the military headquarters and the Philippine's government were moved there. MacArthur had initially considered plan Orange 3 to be defeatist and had neglected to build up supplies in Bataan. Nine days of feverish movement of supplies into Bataan, primarily by barge from Manila, now began in an attempt to feed an anticipated force of 43,000 troops for six months. (Ultimately 80,000 troops and 26,000 refugees flooded Bataan.) Nevertheless, substantial forces remained in other areas for several months.

On 26 December, Manila was declared an open city by MacArthur. However, the U.S. military was still using the city for logistical purposes while the city was declared open, and the Japanese army ignored the declaration and bombed the city.

Units of both defense forces were maneuvered to hold open the escape routes into Bataan, in particular San Fernando, the steel bridges at Calumpit over the deep Pampanga River at the north end of Manila Bay, and Plaridel north of Manila. The South Luzon Force, despite its inexperience and equivocating orders to withdraw and hold, successfully executed "leapfrogging" retrograde techniques and crossed the bridges by 1 January. Japanese air commanders rejected appeals by the 48th Division to bomb the bridges to trap the retreating forces, which were subsequently demolished by Philippine Scout engineers on 1 January.

The Japanese realized MacArthur's plan on 30 December and ordered the 48th Division to press forward and seal off Bataan. In a series of actions between 2 and 4 January, the 11th and 21st Divisions of the Philippine Army, the 26th Cavalry (PS) and the American M3 Stuart tanks of the Provisional Tank Group held open the road from San Fernando to Dinalupihan at the neck of the peninsula for the retreating forces of the South Luzon Force, then made good their own escape. Despite 50% losses in the 194th Tank Battalion during the retreat, the Stuarts and a supporting battery of 75mm SPM halftracks repeatedly stopped Japanese thrusts and were the final units to enter Bataan.

On 30 December, the American 31st Infantry moved to the vicinity of Dalton Pass to cover the flanks of troops withdrawing from central and southern Luzon, while other units of the Philippine Division organized positions at Bataan. The 31st Infantry then moved to a defensive position on the west side of the Olongapo-Manila road, near Layac Junction—at the neck of Bataan Peninsula—on 5 January. The junction was given up on 6 January, but the withdrawal to Bataan was successful.

== Battle of Bataan ==
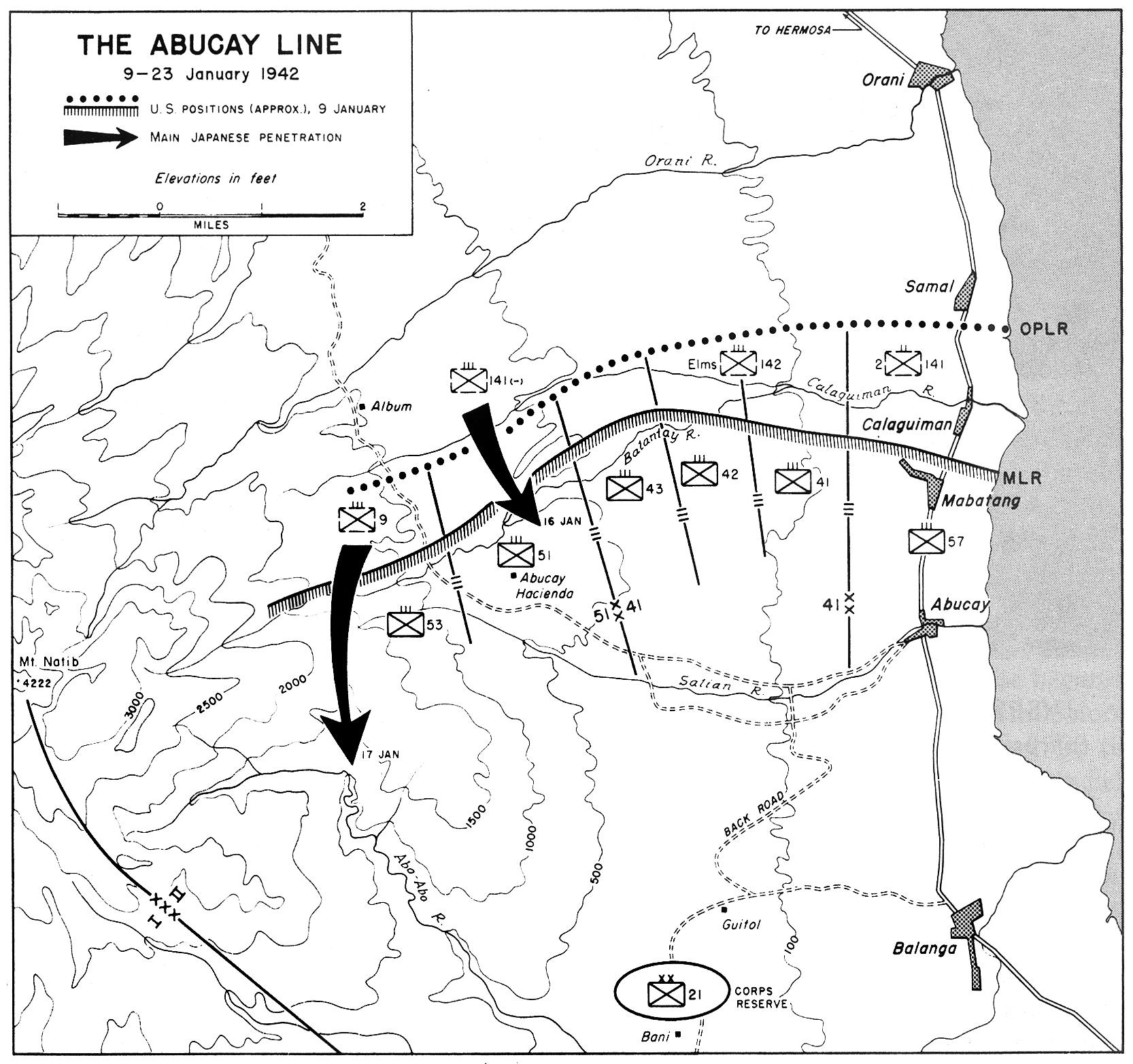
The Abucay defensive line, January 1942.

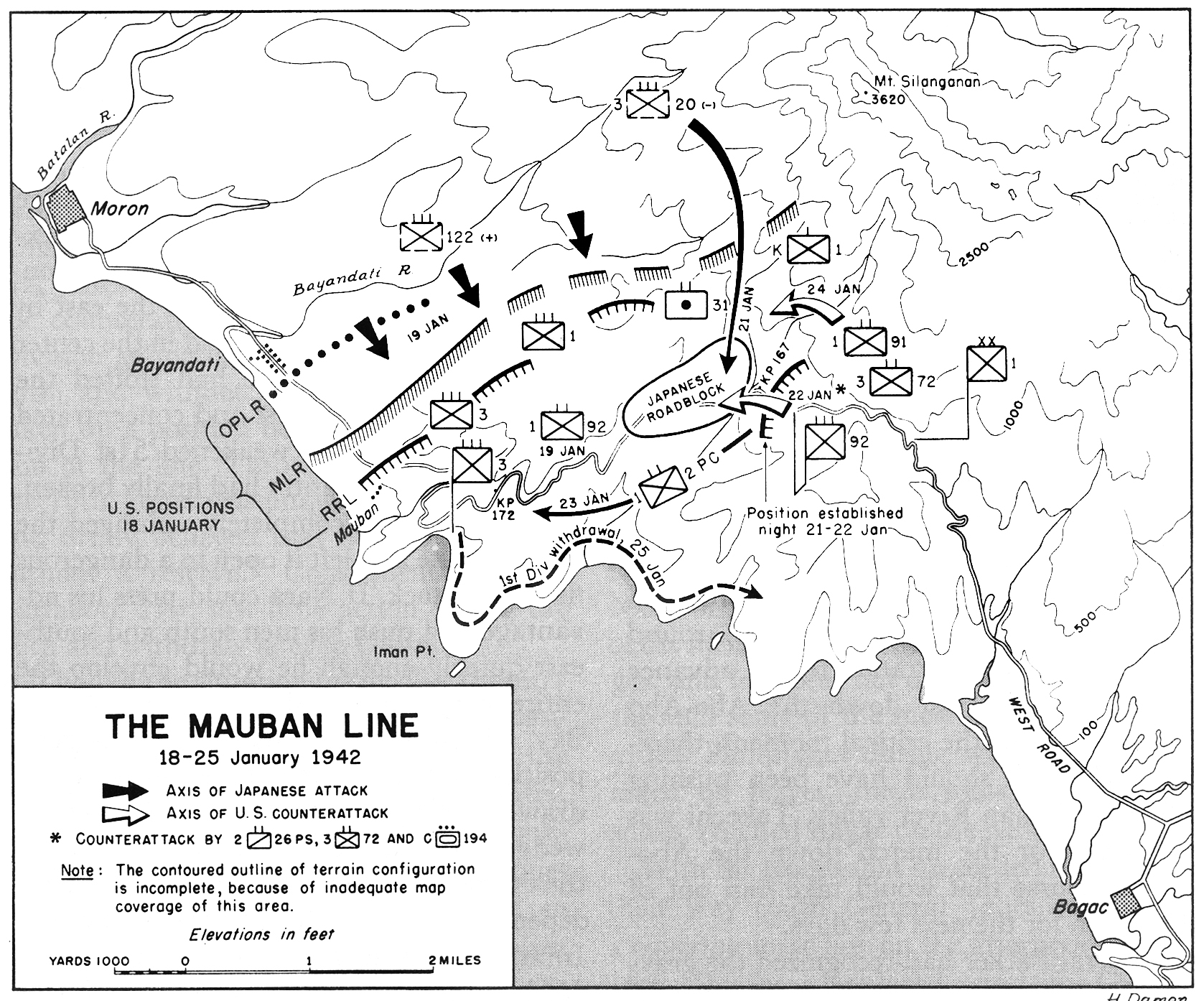
The Mauban defensive line, January 1942.

Japanese amphibious landings on Bataan, January–February 1942.

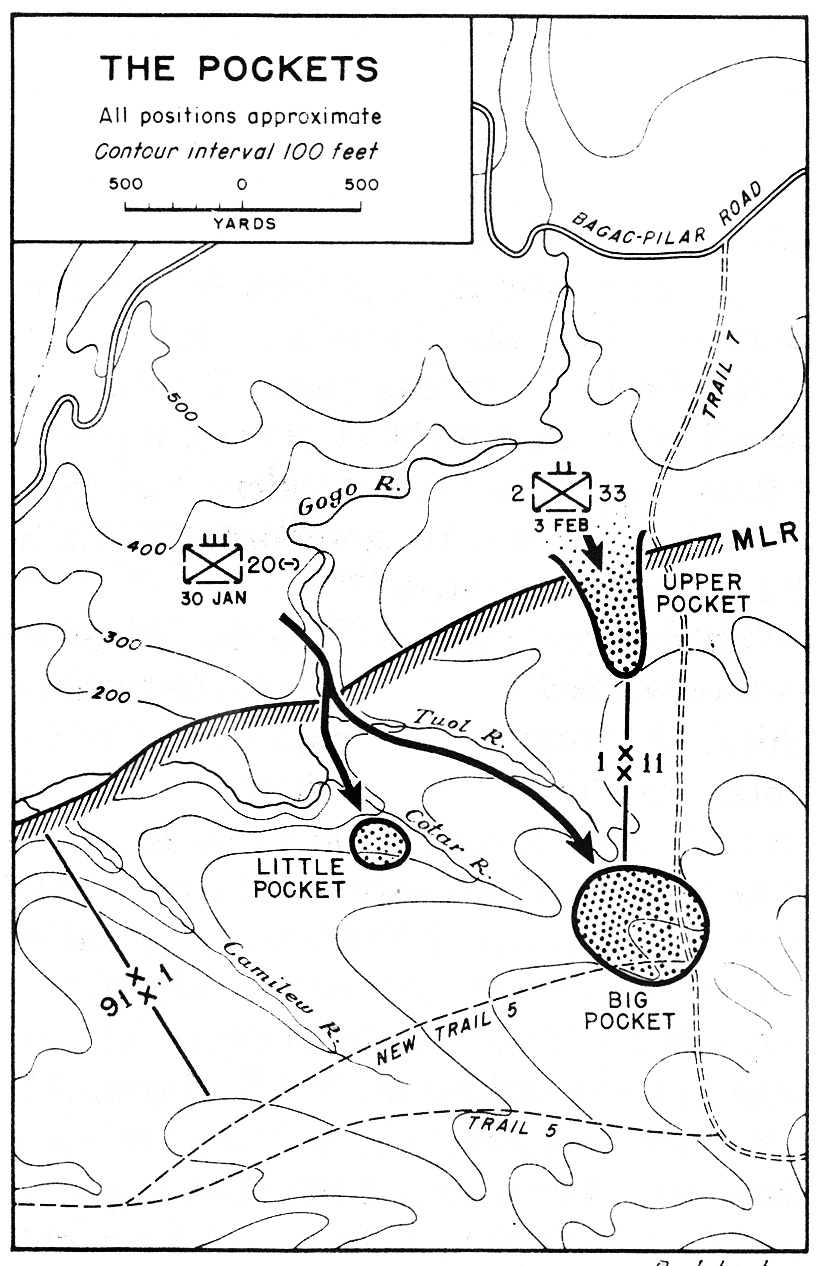
Japanese pockets on Bataan, January–February 1942.

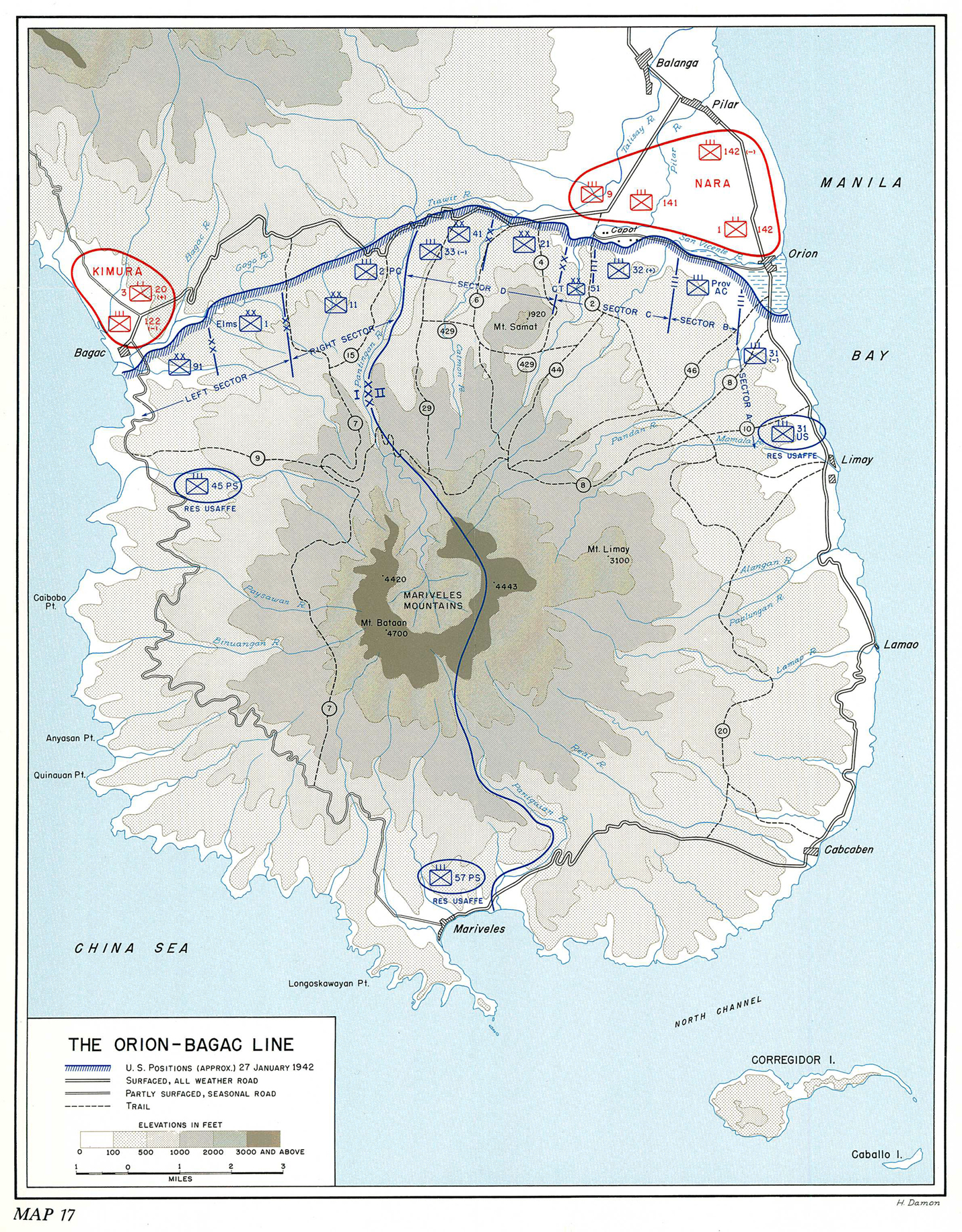
The Orion–Bagac defensive line on Bataan, 1942.

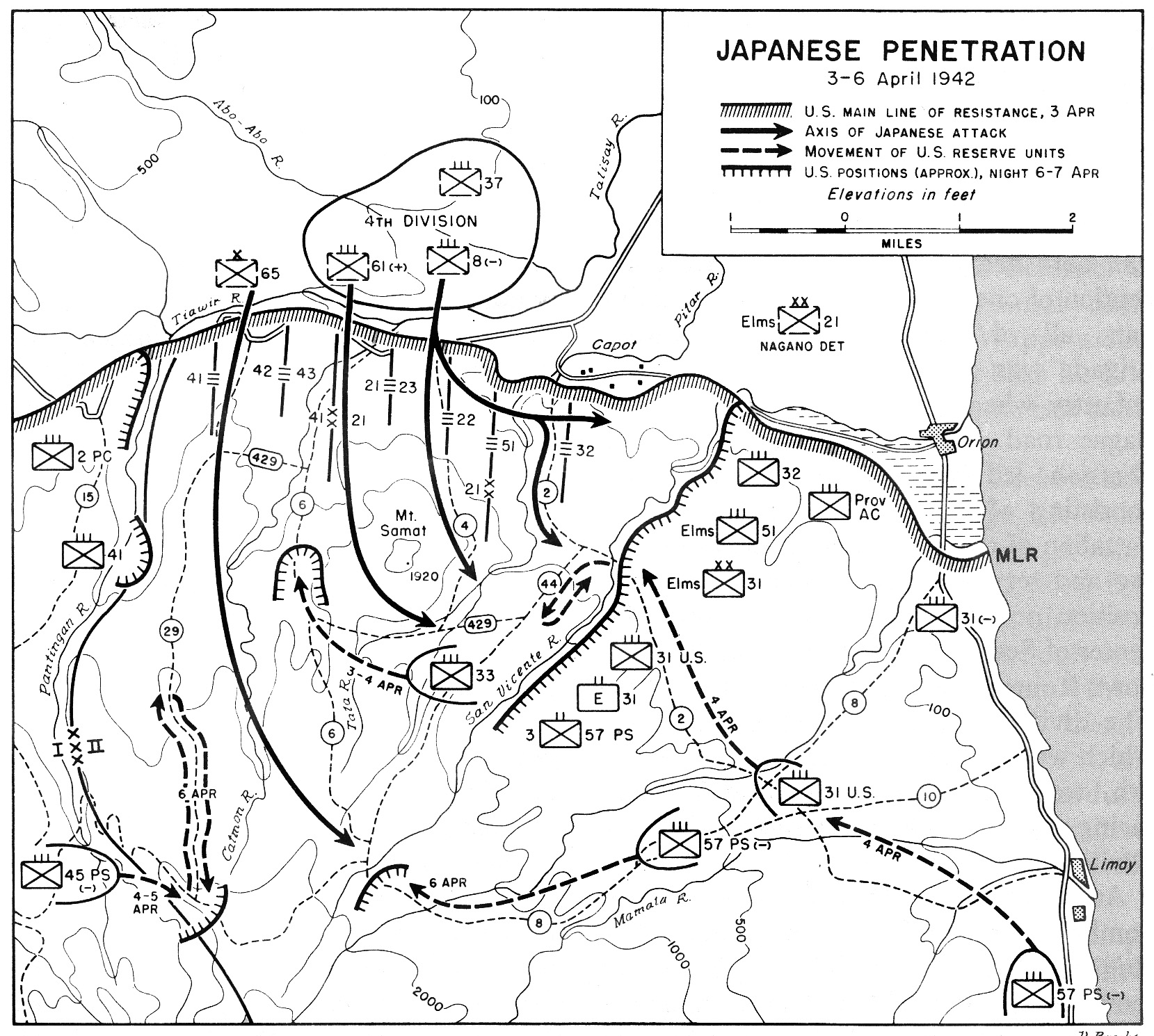
Japanese breakthrough on Bataan in April 1942.

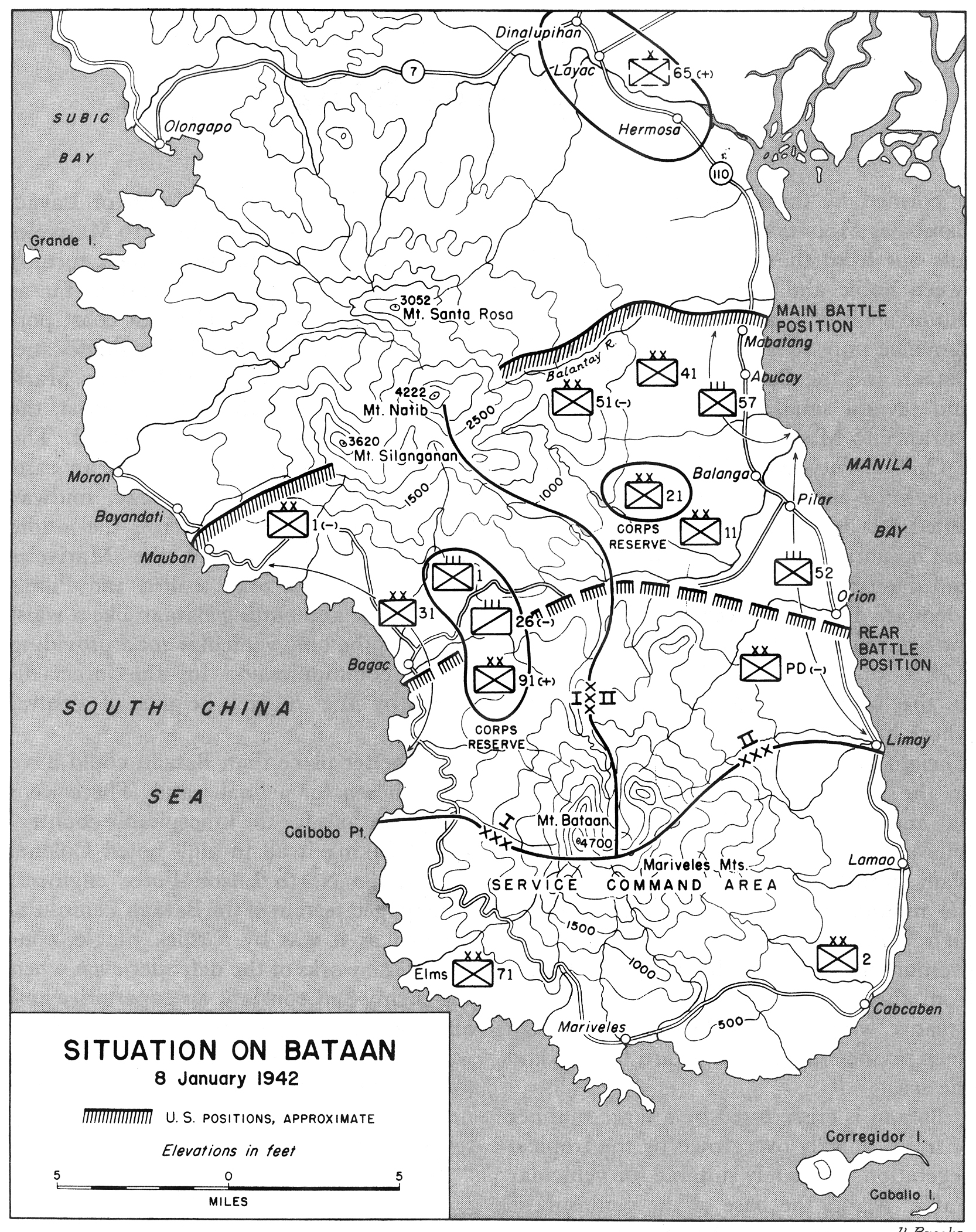
Situation on Bataan, 8 January 1942.

From 7 to 14 January, the Japanese concentrated on reconnaissance and preparations for an attack on the main battle line from Abucay to Mount Natib to Mauban. At the same time, in a critical mistake, they relieved the 48th Division, responsible for much of the success of Japanese operations, with the much less-capable 65th Brigade, intended as a garrison force. The Japanese 5th Air group was withdrawn from operations on 5 January in preparation for movement with the 48th Division to the Netherlands East Indies. U.S. and Filipino forces repelled night attacks near Abucay, and elements of the U.S. Philippine Division counterattacked on 16 January. This failed, and the division withdrew to the reserve battle line from Casa Pilar to Bagac in the center of the peninsula on 26 January.

The 14th Army renewed its attacks on 23 January with an attempted amphibious landing behind the lines by a battalion of the 16th Division, then with general attacks beginning 27 January along the battle line. The amphibious landing was disrupted by a PT boat and contained in brutally dense jungle by ad hoc units made up of U.S. Army Air Corps troops, naval personnel, and Philippine Constabulary. The pocket was then slowly forced back to the cliffs, with high casualties on both sides. Landings to reinforce the surviving pocket on 26 January and 2 February were severely disrupted by air attacks from the few remaining FEAF P-40s, then trapped and eventually annihilated on 13 February.

A penetration in the I Corps line was stopped and broken up into several pockets. On 8 February Homma ordered the suspension of offensive operations in order to reorganize his forces. This could not be carried out immediately, because the 16th Division remained engaged trying to extricate a pocketed battalion of its 20th Infantry. With further losses, the remnants of the battalion, 378 officers and men, were extricated on 15 February. On 22 February the 14th Army line withdrew a few miles to the north, and USAFFE forces re-occupied the abandoned positions. The result of the Battle of the Points and Battle of the Pockets was total destruction of all three battalions of the Japanese 20th Infantry and a clear USAFFE victory.

For several weeks, the Japanese, deterred by heavy losses and reduced to a single brigade, conducted siege operations while waiting refitting and reinforcement. Both armies engaged in patrols and limited local attacks. Because of the worsening Allied position in the Asia-Pacific region, U.S. President Roosevelt ordered MacArthur to proceed to Australia to become Supreme Allied Commander Southwest Pacific Area. On the way, at a rural railway station on 20 March, MacArthur first made the declaration that was to become his much-publicized theme for the following years: "I came through and I shall return". Wainwright officially assumed control of what became United States Forces in the Philippines (USFIP) on 23 March. During this period, elements of the U.S. Philippine Division were shifted to assist in the defense of other sectors.

Beginning on 28 March, a new wave of Japanese air and artillery attacks hit Allied forces who were severely weakened by malnutrition, sickness and prolonged fighting. On 3 April, the Japanese began to break through along Mount Samat, estimating that the offensive would require a month to end the campaign. The U.S. Philippine Division, no longer operating as a coordinated unit and exhausted by five days of nearly continuous combat, was unable to counterattack effectively against heavy Japanese assaults. On 8 April, the U.S. 57th Infantry Regiment (PS) and the 31st Division (PA) were overrun near the Alangan River. The U.S. 45th Infantry Regiment (PS), under orders to reach Mariveles and evacuate to Corregidor, finally surrendered on 10 April. Only 300 men of the U.S. 31st Infantry successfully reached Corregidor.

== Battle of Corregidor ==
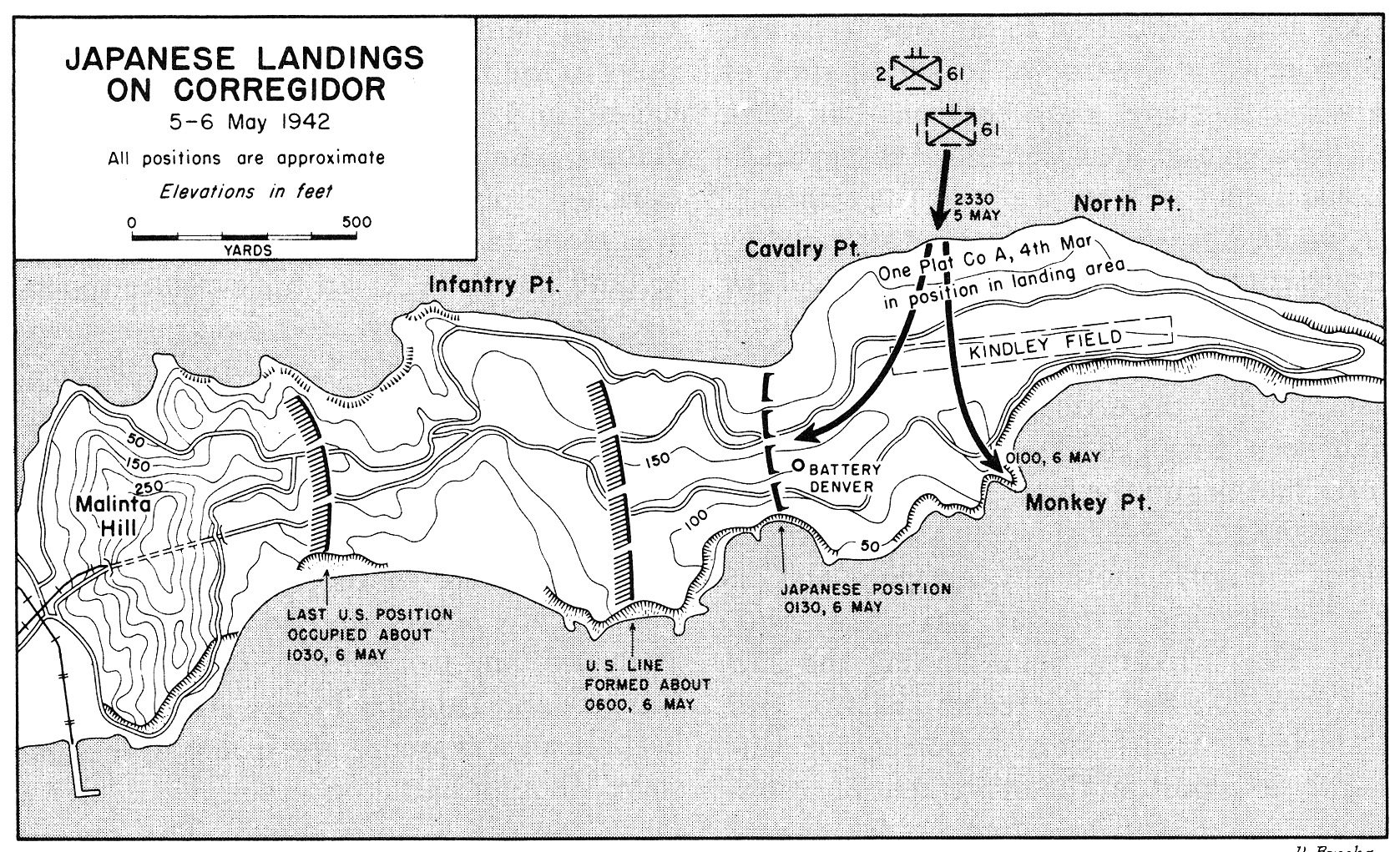
Japanese landings on Corregidor, May 1942.

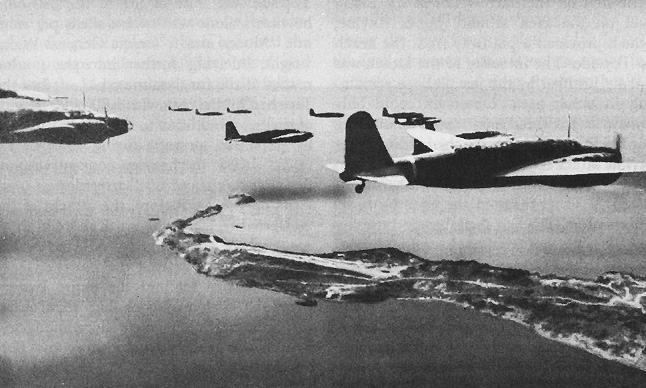
Japanese bombers over Corregidor.

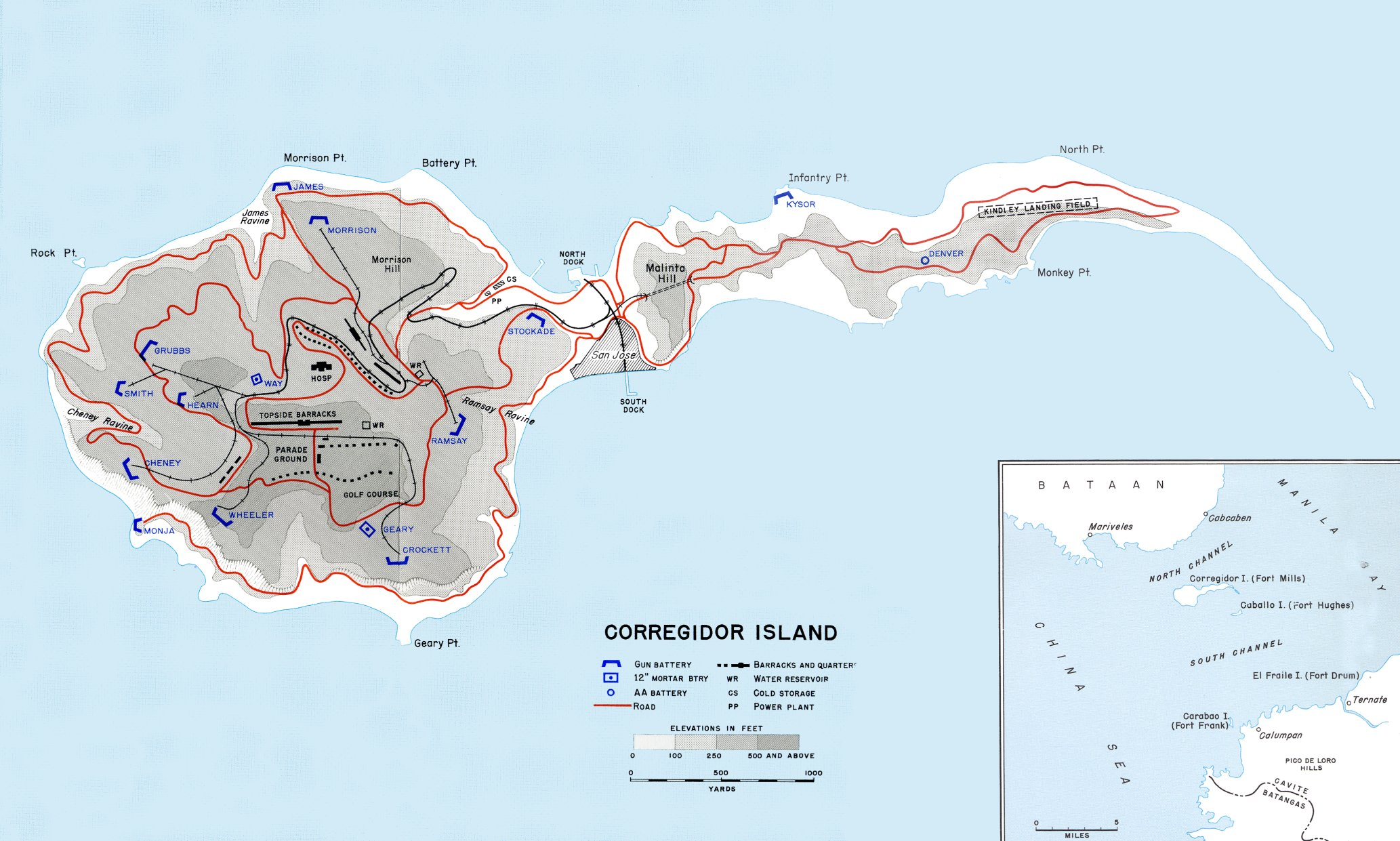
Map of Corregidor island in 1941.

Corregidor (which included Fort Mills) was a U.S. Army Coast Artillery Corps position defending the entrance to Manila Bay, part of the harbor defenses of Manila and Subic Bays. It was armed by older seacoast disappearing gun batteries of the 59th and 91st Coast Artillery Regiments (the latter a Philippine Scouts unit), an offshore mine field of approximately 35 groups of controlled mines, and an anti-aircraft unit, the 60th CA (AA). The latter was posted on the higher elevations of Corregidor. The older stationary batteries with fixed mortars and immense cannon, for defense from attack by sea, were easily put out of commission by Japanese bombers. The American soldiers and Filipino Scouts defended the small fortress until they had little left to wage a defense. Early in 1942, the Japanese air command installed oxygen in its bombers to fly higher than the range of the Corregidor anti-aircraft batteries, and after that time, heavier bombardment began.

In December 1941, Philippines President Manuel L. Quezon, General MacArthur, other high-ranking military officers and diplomats and families escaped the bombardment of Manila and were housed in Corregidor's Malinta Tunnel. Prior to their arrival, Malinta's laterals had served as high command headquarters, hospital and storage of food and arms. In March 1942, several U.S. Navy submarines arrived on the north side of Corregidor. The Navy brought in mail, orders, and weaponry. They took away with them the highest ranking American and Filipino government officers, gold and silver, and other important records. Those who were unable to escape by submarine became prisoners of war or were placed in civilian concentration camps in Manila and other locations.

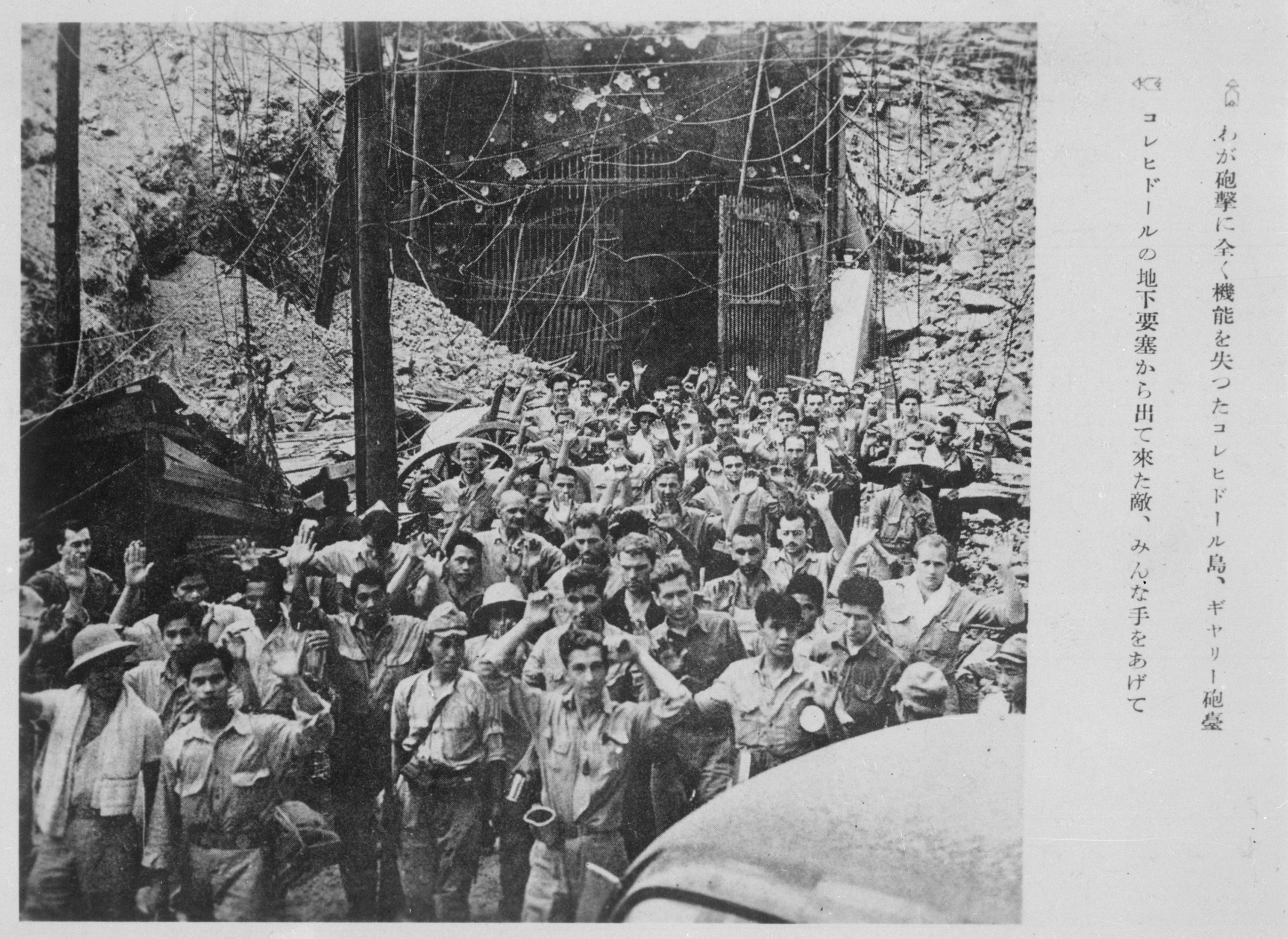
U.S. and Filipino soldiers and sailors surrendering to Japanese forces at Corregidor.

Corregidor was defended by 11,000 personnel, comprising the units mentioned above that were stationed on Corregidor, the U.S. 4th Marine Regiment, and U.S. Navy personnel deployed as infantry. Some were able to get to Corregidor from the Bataan Peninsula when the Japanese overwhelmed the units there. The Japanese began their final assault on Corregidor with an artillery barrage on 1 May. On the night of 5–6 May two battalions of the Japanese 61st Infantry Regiment landed at the northeast end of the island. Despite strong resistance, the Japanese established a beachhead that was reinforced by tanks and artillery. The defenders were quickly pushed back toward the stronghold of Malinta Hill.

Late on 6 May Wainwright asked Homma for terms of surrender. Homma insisted that surrender include all Allied forces in the Philippines. Believing that the lives of all those on Corregidor would be endangered, Wainwright accepted. On 8 May he sent a message to Sharp ordering him to surrender the Visayan-Mindanao Force. Sharp complied, but many individuals carried on the fight as guerrillas. Few unit commanders were so hard pressed as to be forced to surrender, and none had any desire to surrender. Sharp's decision to surrender involved many factors. Major Larry S. Schmidt, in a 1982 master's degree thesis, said Sharp's decision was based on two reasons: that the Japanese were capable of executing the 10,000 survivors of Corregidor, and that Sharp now knew his forces would not be reinforced by the United States, as had been previously thought.

=== List of U.S. generals who became prisoners-of-war ===
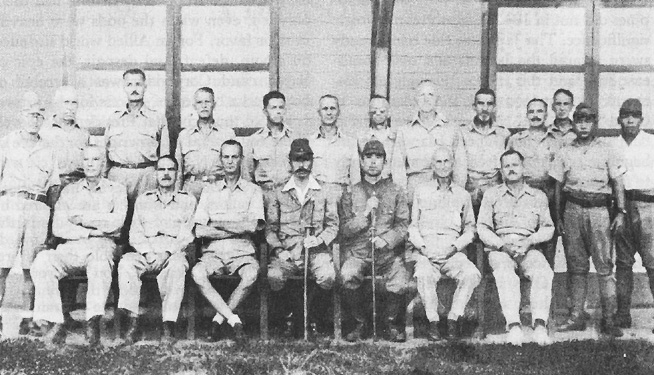
U.S. generals in a group photo with Japanese captors

Eighteen United States Army generals surrendered to Japanese forces by May 1942:

- Lieutenant General Jonathan M. Wainwright, commanding general, United States Forces in the Philippines (USFIP)
- Major General Albert M. Jones, commanding general, Philippine I Corps
- Major General Edward P. King, commanding general, Northern Luzon
- Major General George F. Moore, commanding general, Harbor Defenses of Manila and Subic Bays/Philippine Coast Artillery
- Major General George M. Parker, commanding general, Southern Luzon/Philippine II Corps
- Major General William F. Sharp, commanding general, Visayan-Mindanao Force Philippines
- Brigadier General Lewis C. Beebe, chief of staff to Lieutenant General Jonathan M. Wainwright
- Brigadier General Clifford Bluemel, commanding general, 31st Division (Philippines)
- Brigadier General William E. Brougher, commanding general, 11th Division (Philippines)
- Brigadier General Bradford G. Chynoweth, commanding general, 61st Division (Philippines)
- Brigadier General Charles C. Drake, commanding general, Quartermaster Corps in the Philippines
- Brigadier General Arnold J. Funk, chief of staff to Major General Edward P. King
- Brigadier General Maxon S. Lough, commanding general, Philippine Division
- Brigadier General Allan C. McBride, deputy chief of staff to General Douglas MacArthur and commanding general of the Service Command Area † (died 9 May 1944 in a prisoner-of-war camp)
- Brigadier General Clinton A. Pierce, commanding general, 26th Cavalry Regiment (Philippine Scouts)
- Brigadier General Carl H. Seals, adjutant general, United States Army Forces in the Far East (USAFFE)
- Brigadier General Joseph P. Vachon, commanding general, 101st Division (Philippines)
- Brigadier General James R. N. Weaver, commanding general, 1st Provisional Tank Group

Two Americans serving as Philippine Army generals also surrendered to Japanese forces:

- Brigadier General Guy O. Fort, commanding general, 81st Division (Philippines) † (executed 11 November 1942 in a prisoner-of-war camp)
- Brigadier General Luther R. Stevens, commanding general, 91st Division (Philippines)

The other Philippine Army generals captured by Japanese forces were native Filipinos Major General Guillermo B. Francisco and Brigadier Generals Mateo M. Capinpin, Vicente P. Lim, and Fidel V. Segundo. Ten U.S. Army generals and General Stevens surrendered at Bataan in April 1942. Generals Wainwright, Moore, Beebe, and Drake surrendered at Corregidor in May 1942. Generals Sharp, Chynoweth, Seals, Vachon, and Fort were captured in the southern Philippines.

== Aftermath ==
Route of the Bataan Death March, April 1942.

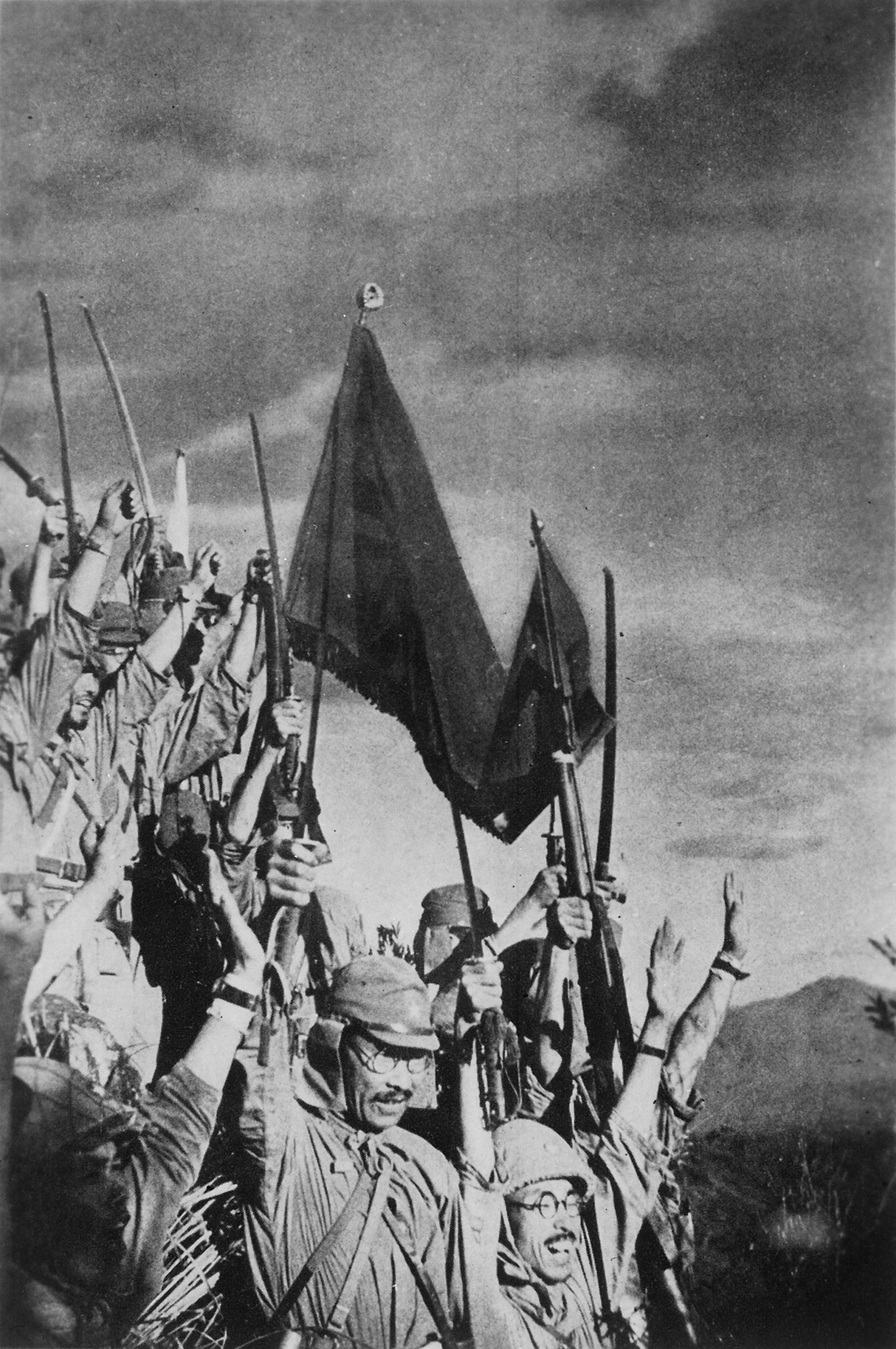
Japanese troops conquered Bataan, Philippines in 1942

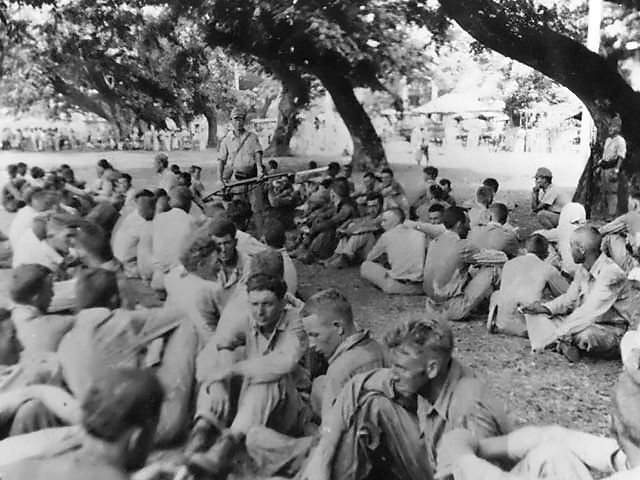
Group of American prisoners, May 1942

General Homma's victory in the Philippines was not received at the Imperial General Headquarters, and specifically by Premier Hideki Tojo, as warmly as he hoped for. They scoffed at Homma's supposed inefficiency and lack of drive to defeat the Americans according to their planned timetable. Homma then was recalled to Tokyo to serve as a reserve officer.

The defeat was the beginning of three and a half years of harsh treatment for the Allied survivors, including atrocities like the Bataan Death March and the misery of Japanese prison camps, and the "hell ships" on which American and Allied men were sent to Japan to be used as slave labor in mines and factories. Thousands were crowded into the holds of Japanese ships without water, food, or sufficient ventilation. The Japanese did not mark "POW" on the decks of these vessels, and some were attacked and sunk by Allied aircraft and submarines. For example, on 7 September 1944 SS Shinyō Maru was sunk by USS Paddle with losses of 668 POWs; only 82 POWs survived.

Although the campaign was a victory to the Japanese, it took longer than anticipated to defeat the Filipinos and Americans. This required forces that would have been used to attack Borneo and Java to be diverted to the battle in the Philippines and also slowed the advance on New Guinea and the Solomon Islands.

During the occupation of the Philippines, American and Filipino guerrillas fought against the occupying forces. The Allied and Philippine Commonwealth forces began the campaign to recapture the Philippines in 1944, with landings on the island of Leyte. On 29 January 1945 US and Philippine forces liberated POWs in the Raid at Cabanatuan.

=== Importance ===
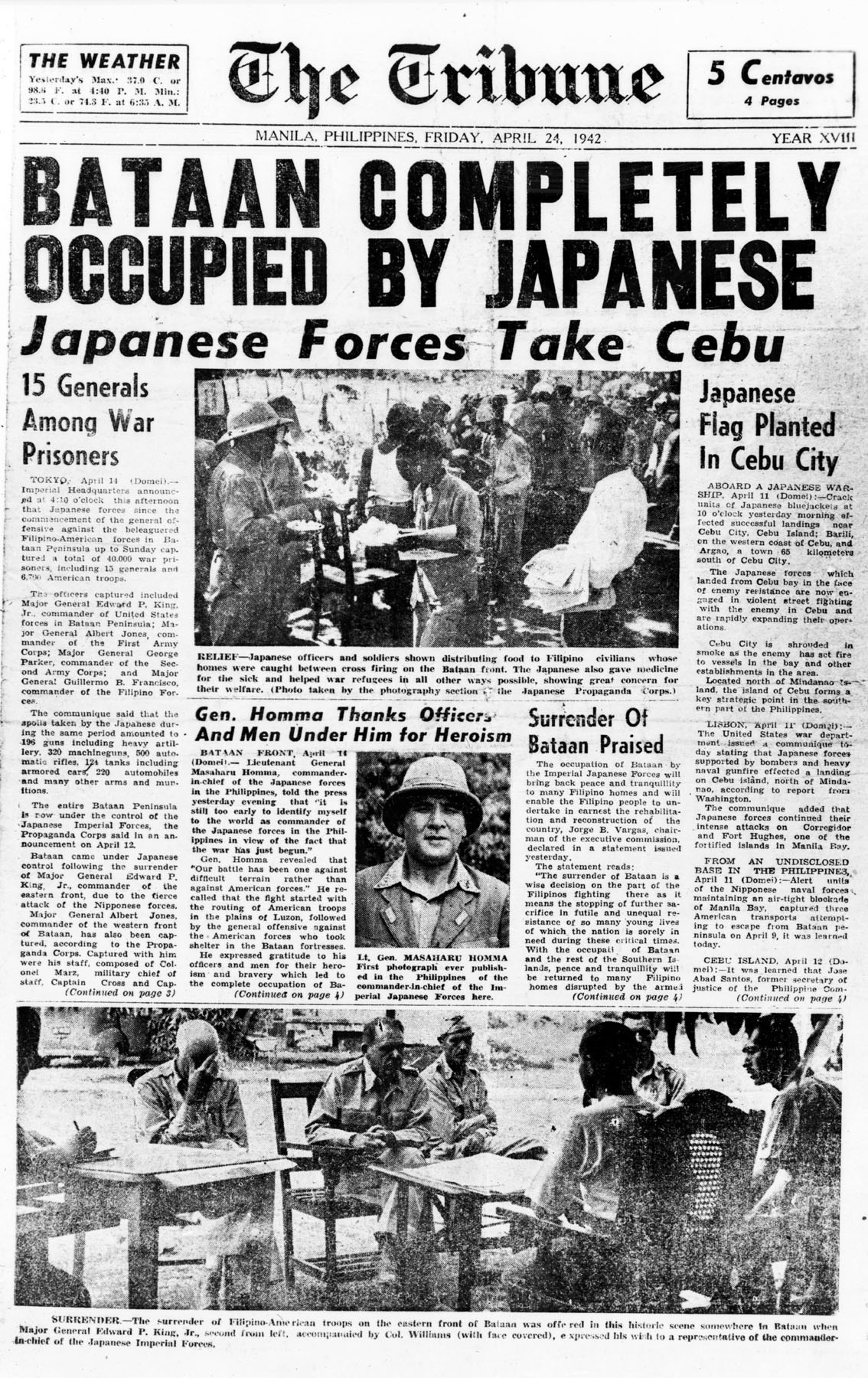
Manila newspaper announcing the fall of Bataan

The defense of the Philippines was the longest resistance to the Japanese Imperial Army in the initial stages of World War II. After the Battle of Abucay, the Japanese started to withdraw from Bataan and resumed their attack in April, allowing MacArthur 40 days to prepare Australia as an operational base; the initial resistance in the Philippines allowed Australia crucial time to organize for its defense. Philippine-American resistance against the Japanese up to the fall of Bataan on 9 April 1942 lasted 105 days (3 months and 2 days).

== USAFFE order of battle, 3 December 1941; casualty reports ==
=== United States Army Forces Far East ===
General Douglas MacArthur

==== Ground forces ====
Philippine Constabulary (Maj. Gen. Guillermo Francisco)

1st PC Regiment
2nd PC Regiment
3rd PC Regiment
4th PC Regiment

HQ Philippine Dept. (Maj. Gen. George Grunert)

Headquarters, Harbor Defenses of Manila and Subic Bays
Philippine Division (PS=Philippine Scouts) (As of 31 Jul 1941, Division numbered 10,743)

Post Service Command (PS) (ABMC lists 175 dead)

Infantry

31st US Infantry Regiment (ABMC lists 936 dead)
43rd US Infantry Regiment (PS) (ABMC lists 31 dead)
45th US Infantry Regiment (PS) (ABMC lists 1,039 dead)
57th US Infantry Regiment (George S. Clarke) (PS) (ABMC lists 983 dead)
26th US Cavalry Regiment (ABMC lists 301 dead)

Provisional Tank Group (Brig. Gen. James Weaver)

17th Ordnance Battalion (one Company) (ABMC lists 45 dead)
192nd Tank Battalion (ABMC lists 189 dead)+ HQ Co 192nd Tank Battalion (ABMC lists 2 dead) (Note: 192nd Tank Battalion article reports 328 did not survive the war)
194th Tank Battalion less Company B (ABMC lists 183 dead)

Artillery

1st Philippine Coast Artillery (ABMC lists 1 dead)
23rd Field Artillery (PS) (Btry A) (ABMC lists 159 dead+ 1 dead) (1st Battalion)
24th Field Artillery (PS) (ABMC lists 309 dead)
59th Coast Artillery (US Army) (Corregidor) (ABMC lists 329 dead+1 (Col. Paul Bunker))
86th Field Artillery (PS) (ABMC lists 169 total (8 Dead for Regiment + 161 dead for Battalion)
88th Field Artillery (PS) (ABMC lists 186 dead)
91st Coast Artillery (PS) (ABMC lists 202 dead)
92nd Coast Artillery (PS) (Corregidor) (ABMC lists 200 dead)
200th Coast Artillery (US Army) (ABMC lists 373 dead)
60th Coast Artillery (United States) (Corregidor) (ABMC lists 390 dead)
515th Coast Artillery Regiment (US Army) (ABMC lists 207 dead)

Support

14th Engineer Regiment (PS) (ABMC lists 324 dead)
14th Engineer Battalion (PS) (ABMC lists 4 dead)
202nd Philippine Engineer Battalion (US Army) (ABMC lists 9 dead)
12th Medical Battalion (PS) (ABMC lists 121 dead)
12th Medical Regiment (PS) (ABMC lists 13 dead)
71st Medical Battalion (PS) (ABMC lists 0 dead)
12th Military Police Company (PS) (ABMC lists 40 dead)
808th Military Police Company (US Army) (ABMC lists 90 dead)
47th Motor Transport Company (PS) (ABMC lists 1 dead)
12th Ordnance Company (PS) (ABMC lists 45 dead)
17th Ordnance Company (US Army) (ABMC lists 45 dead)
75th Ordnance Depot Company (US Army) (ABMC lists 3 dead
75th Ordnance Company (US Army) (ABMC lists 35 dead)
12th Quartermaster Battalion HQ (PS) (ABMC lists 3 dead)
12th Quartermaster Battalion (PS) (ABMC lists 70 dead)
12th Quartermaster Regiment (United States) (PS) (ABMC lists 90 dead)
74th Quartermaster Bakery Co (PS) (ABMC lists 17 dead)
12th Signal Company (PS) (ABMC lists 77 dead)
252nd Signal Construction Company (PS) (ABMC lists 44 dead)

==== Air forces ====
Far East Air Force
Major General Lewis H. Brereton
Brigadier General Harold Huston George (Note: Killed in flying accident Australia 30 Apr 1942)

5th Air Base Group
V Bomber Command

19th Bomb Group (Heavy) (Headquarters, Clark Field) (ABMC lists 3 dead); HQ Squadron 19th BG (ABMC lists 103 dead)

14th Bomb Squadron (Del Monte Field, December 5, 8 B-17 Flying Fortress) (ABMC lists 13 dead)
28th Bomb Squadron (Clark Field, 8 B-17) (ABMC lists 93 dead)
30th Bomb Squadron (Clark Field, 9 B-17) (ABMC lists 110 dead)
93rd Bomb Squadron (Del Monte Field, December 5, 8 B-17) (ABMC lists 116 dead)
440th Ordnance Squadron (ABMC Lists 68 dead)

27th Bomb Group (Light) (Note: Ground echelon fought at Bataan as 2nd Battalion (27th Bombardment Group) Provisional Infantry Regiment (Air Corp).) Headquarters (ABMC lists 3 dead)

2nd Observation Squadron (Nichols Field, 21 various aircraft) (ABMC lists 71 dead)
16th Bomb Squadron (Fort William McKinley) (ABMC lists 72 dead)
17th Bomb Squadron (San Fernando Field) (ABMC Lists 62 dead)
91st Bomb Squadron (San Marcelino Field, B-18 Bolo) (ABMC lists 76 dead)
48th Material Squadron (ABMC lists 53 dead+ 19 also listed dead when the 48th Squadron was part of V Air Base Group)
454th Ordnance Squadron (ABMC lists 71 dead)

V Interceptor Command

19th Air Base Group (ABMC lists 1 dead)
20th Air Base Group (ABMC lists 1 dead)

Tow Target Detachment
5th Communications Detachment (ABMC lists 0 dead)
5th Weather Detachment (ABMC lists 0 dead)
Chemical Warfare Detachment

4th Chemical Company (Aviation) (ABMC lists 33 dead)
5th Chemical Detachment (Company-Aviation) (ABMC lists 2 dead)

19th Air Base Squadron (ABMC lists 79 dead)
27th Material Squadron (ABMC lists 75 dead)
28th Material Squadron (ABMC lists 92 dead)
47th Material Squadron
803d Engineering Detachment (Battalion-Aviation) (ABMC lists 232 dead)
809th Engineering Detachment
409th Signal/Communications Detachment (Company-Aviation) (ABMC lists 29 dead)
429th Maintenance Detachment

24th Pursuit Group (Headquarters, Clark Field). Colonel Orrin l. Grover. HQ Squadron (ABMC lists 112 dead)

3rd Pursuit Squadron (Iba Field, 18 P-40E Warhawk) (ABMC lists 0 dead)
17th Pursuit Squadron (Nichols Field, 18 P-40E) (ABMC lists 0 dead)
20th Pursuit Squadron (Clark Field, 18 P-40B) (ABMC lists 96 dead)

35th Pursuit Group (headquarters en route to Philippines) (ABMC lists 5 dead)

21st Pursuit Squadron (attached 24th PG, Nichols Field, 18 P-40E received December 7) (ABMC lists 89 dead)
34th Pursuit Squadron (attached 24th PG, Del Carmen Field, 18 Seversky P-35A received December 7) (ABMC lists 0 dead)

Philippine Aircraft Warning Detachment
6th Pursuit Squadron, Philippine Army Air Corps (Batangas Field, 12 P-26 Peashooter) (ABMC lists 1 dead)

=== Philippine Army ===
Major General Basilio Valdes

1st (Regular) Division (Brig. Gen. Fidel V. Segundo / Col. Kearie Berry)

1st Infantry Regiment
3rd Infantry Regiment
4th Infantry Regiment
1st Field Artillery Group

2nd PC Division (Maj. Gen. Guillermo Francisco)

1st PC Regiment (Lt. Col. Mariano Castañeda)
2nd PC Regiment (Lt. Col. Manuel V. Anastacio)
4th PC Regiment (Lt. Col. Rafael Jalandoni)
2nd Field Artillery Regiment (PC) (Lt. Col. Emmanuel Cepeda)

11th Division (Brig. Gen. William Brougher)

HQ 11th Division (ABMC lists 1 dead)
HQ Com 11th Division (ABMC lists 1 dead)
11th Infantry Regiment (ABMC lists 4 dead)
12th Infantry Regiment (ABMC lists 2 dead)
13th Infantry Regiment (ABMC lists 1 dead)
11th Field Artillery Regt (ABMC lists 1 dead)

21st Division (Brig. Gen. Mateo Capinpin)

21st Infantry Regiment (ABMC lists 3 dead)
22nd Infantry Regiment (ABMC lists 3 dead)
21st Field Artillery Regiment (ABMC lists 3 dead)
21st Engineer Battalion (ABMC lists 2 dead)

31st Division (Brig. Gen. Clifford Bluemel)

31st Infantry Regiment (ABMC lists 6 dead)
32nd Infantry Regiment (ABMC lists 3 dead)
31st Field Artillery Regiment (ABMC lists 2 dead)
31st Engineer Battalion (ABMC lists 1 dead)

41st Division (Brig. Gen. Vicente Lim) (ABMC listed dead)

41st Infantry Regiment (ABMC lists 6 dead)
42nd Infantry Regiment (ABMC lists 4 dead)
41st Engineer Battalion (ABMC lists 1 dead)

51st Division (Brig. Gen. Albert Jones / Col. Adlai Young)

51st Infantry Regiment (ABMC lists 4 dead)
52nd Infantry Regiment (ABMC lists 4 dead)
53rd Infantry Regiment (ABMC lists 4 dead)
51st Field Artillery Regiment (ABMC lists 4 dead)

61st Division (Brig Gen. Bradford Chynoweth / Col. Albert Christie)

HQ 61st Division (ABMC Lists 1 dead)
61st Infantry Regiment (ABMC lists 1 dead)
62nd Infantry Regiment (ABMC lists 4 dead)
63rd Infantry Regiment (ABMC Lists 1 dead)
64th Infantry Regiment
65th Infantry Regiment
61st Field Artillery Regiment (ABMC lists 4 dead)

71st Division (Brig. Gen. Clyde Selleck / Brig. Gen. Clinton Pierce)

71st Infantry Regiment (ABMC lists 2 dead)
72nd Infantry Regiment (ABMC lists 6 dead)
73rd Infantry Regiment (ABMC lists 3 dead)
74th Infantry Regiment (ABMC lists 1 dead)
75th Infantry Regiment (ABMC lists 1 dead)
71st Field Artillery Regiment (ABMC Lists 1 dead)
71st Quartermaster Co (ABMC lists 1 dead)

81st Division (Brig Gen Guy O. Fort) (KIA)

81st Division (ABMC lists 5 dead)
82nd Infantry Regiment (ABMC lists 2 dead)
83rd Infantry Regiment (ABMC lists 1 dead)
81st Field Artillery Regiment (ABMC lists 2 dead)
81st Engineer Battalion (ABMC lists 1 dead)

91st Division (Brig. Gen. Luther Stevens)

HQ 91st Division (ABMC lists 1 dead)
91st Infantry Regiment (ABMC lists 2 dead)
92nd Infantry Regiment (ABMC lists 5 dead)
93rd Infantry Regiment (ABMC lists 1 dead)
91st Field Artillery Regiment (ABMC lists 5 dead)

101st Division (Brig. Gen. Joseph Vachon)
(ABMC lists 1 with Division)

101st Infantry Regiment (ABMC lists 7 dead)
102nd Infantry Regiment (ABMC lists 0 dead)
103rd Infantry Regiment (ABMC lists 3 dead)
101st Field Artillery Regiment ABMC lists 1 dead)
101st Engineer Battalion (ABMC Lists 1 dead)

102nd Division (Col. William P. Morse)
Provisional Field Artillery Brigade (Col. Albert Ives)
Harbor Defenses of Manila and Subic Bays (Note: For strength in November 1941 see)

Harbor defenses included units listed above
HQ and HQ Battery

59th Coast Artillery (see above for casualty listings)
60th Coast Artillery (see above for casualty listings)
91st Coast Artillery (PS) (see above for casualty listings)
92nd Coast Artillery (PS) (see above for casualty listings)

USAMP Harrison

Station Hospital
Chemical Warfare Detachment

=== United States Navy ===
United States Asiatic Fleet and 16th Naval District
Admiral Thomas C. Hart

1 heavy cruiser

USS Houston (CA-30) – lost 1 March 1942, 368 survived of 1,061 crew

2 light cruisers

USS Boise (CL-47)
USS Marblehead (CL-12)

13 destroyers

Destroyer Squadron 29 (Capt. Herbert V. Wiley)

USS Black Hawk (AD-9)
USS Paul Jones (DD-230)

Destroyer Division 50 (Cmdr. P.H. Talbot)

USS John D. Ford (DD-228)
USS Peary (DD-226) – escaped to Australia; sunk 19 February 1942
USS Pillsbury (DD-227) – escaped to Dutch East Indies; sunk 2 March 1942
USS Pope (DD-225) – escaped to Dutch East Indies; sunk 1 March 1942

Destroyer Division 57 (Cmdr. E.M. Crouch)

USS Alden (DD-211)
USS Edsall (DD-219) – escaped to Australia; sunk 1 Mar 1942
USS John D. Edwards (DD-216)
USS Whipple (DD-217)

Destroyer Division 58 (Cmdr. Thomas H. Binford)

USS Barker (DD-213)
USS Bulmer (DD-222)
USS Parrott (DD-218)
USS Stewart (DD-224) – escaped to Java and scuttled 2 March 1942; salvaged as IJN Patrol Boat 102, sunk in 1946

1 minesweeper

USS Whippoorwill (AM-35)

6 PT boats

Motor Torpedo Boat Squadron Three

PT-31, PT-32, PT-33, PT-34, PT-35, PT-41 — all lost 6 December 1941–March 1942.

US Submarines at Manila (Mariveles Naval Section Base, Cavite, Philippines)

Submarine Squadron 2 (12 S- and Salmon-class)
Submarine Squadron 5 (11 Porpoise- and Sargo-class)
Submarine Squadron 21 (4 Porpoise- and Sargo-class)
submarine tender USS Holland (AS-3)
6 S-class (4 torpedo tubes, 14 knots surfaced)

USS S-36 (SS-141) – scuttled following grounding 21 January 1942
USS S-37 (SS-142)
USS S-38 (SS-143)
USS S-39 (SS-144) – run aground and abandoned 13 August 1942
USS S-40 (SS-145)
USS S-41 (SS-146)

7 Porpoise-class (6 torpedo tubes, 18 knots surfaced)

USS Porpoise (SS-172)
USS Pike (SS-173)
USS Shark (SS-174)
USS Tarpon (SS-175)
USS Perch (SS-176) – escaped to Australia; scuttled 3 March 1942 (6 out of 54 crew did not survive the war)
USS Pickerel (SS-177) – escaped to Australia; lost with all hands 3 April 1943
USS Permit (SS-178)

5 Salmon-class (8 torpedo tubes, 21 knots surfaced)

USS Salmon (SS-182)
USS Seal (SS-183)
USS Snapper (SS-185)
USS Stingray (SS-186)
USS Sturgeon (SS-187)

9 Sargo-class (8 torpedo tubes, 21 knots surfaced)

USS Sargo (SS-188)
USS Saury (SS-189)
USS Spearfish (SS-190)
USS Sculpin (SS-191)
USS Swordfish (SS-193)
USS Seadragon (SS-194)
USS Sealion (SS-195) – scuttled 25 December 1941 after damage 10 December 1941; 5 crewmen lost in war
USS Searaven (SS-196)
USS Seawolf (SS-197)

Patrol Wing 10 (Cavite Naval Base, Luzon, Philippines)

Capt. Frank D. Wagner

VP-101
VP-102
destroyer USS Childs (DD-241)
destroyer USS William B. Preston (DD-344)
minesweeper USS Heron (AM-10)

In December 1941, naval forces were augmented by the following:

schooner USS Lanikai
Station Cast US Navy Code breaking on the Japanese military; evacuated to Australia 1942

In addition 2 district patrol craft YP-16 and YP-17 and about 70 miscellaneous district craft were lost in the Philippines in 1942.

China Yangtze Patrol

Rear Admiral William A. Glassford

gunboat USS Asheville (PG-21) – lost 3 March 1942; 161 crew lost
gunboat USS Tulsa (PG-22)
gunboat USS Luzon (PG-47) – scuttled 6 May 1942 but salvaged by the Japanese; sunk in the Philippines by USS Narwhal (SS-167) on 3 Mar 1944
river gunboat USS Wake (PR-3) – captured 8 December 1941
river gunboat USS Oahu (PR-6) – sunk 5 May 1942
river gunboat USS Mindanao (PR-8) – lost 2 May 1942

Other US Navy losses

armored cruiser USS New York (ACR-2) scuttled December 1941
minesweeper USS Finch (AM-9) ran out of fuel and abandoned March, sunk by Japanese on 9 Apr 1942; salvaged as IJN Patrol Boat 103, sunk in 1945
minesweeper USS Bittern (AM-36) scuttled 10 Dec 1941
minesweeper USS Pigeon (ASR-6) sunk 4 May 1942
minesweeper USS Quail (AM-15) scuttled following damage by air and surface attack 5 May 1942
submarine tender USS Canopus (AS-9) scuttled 10 Apr 1942 (548 crew served with 4th Marine Regiment 212 KIA/MIA)
fleet tug USS Genesee (AT-55) scuttled 5 May 1942 but salvaged by the Japanese; sunk on 5 Nov 1944
seaplane tender USS Langley (AV-3) escaped to Dutch East Indies and Australia; lost 8 May 1942
survey ship USC&GSS Research beached 30 Jan 1942

=== United States Marine Corps ===
- 4th Marine Regiment (Colonel Samuel L. Howard) stationed at Corregidor; consisted of 142 different organizations:
  - USMC: 72 officers; 1,368 enlisted
  - USN: 37 officers; 848 enlisted
  - USAAC/PA: 111 officers; 1,455 enlisted

4th Marines Casualties were 315 killed/15 MIA/357 WIA in the Philippine Campaign. 105 Marines were captured on Bataan and 1,283 captured on Corregidor of whom 490 did not survive.

=== Miscellaneous ===
Harbor Defenses, April 15, 1942 (Maj. Gen. George F. Moore):

- US Army: 5,012
- US Navy: 2,158
- USMC: 1,617
- Philippine Scouts: 1,298
- Philippine Army: 1,818
- Philippine Navy: 400
- US Civilians: 343
- Civilians (other): 2,082
- Army Nurse Corps, Navy Nurse Corps: 78 ("Angels of Bataan")

== See also ==
- Attacks on the United States
- Day of Valor
