= 31st Field Artillery Regiment (PA) =

- Active: August 28, 1941 - April 9, 1942
- Disbanded: April 9, 1942
- Countries: United States; Philippines
- Allegiance: United States Army
- Branch: Army
- Type: Field Artillery
- Role: Reserve Unit
- Size: 1,500
- Part of: 31st Infantry Division
- Garrison/HQ: Camp Sanchez, Zambales
- Equipment: M1916 75mm Howitzers; QF 2.95inch Mountain Guns
- Engagements: Battle of Bataan

Commanders
- Notable commanders: Lieutenant Colonel Harry J. Harper

31st Field Artillery Regiment, is a unit of 31st Infantry Division of the Philippine Army under the USAFFE, mobilized in August 1941 but was equipped in November, and was in action December 1941 to April 9, 1942. Division's area of responsibility covered Zambales, Pampanga, Bataan, and Bulacan.

== Organization ==
The regiment was activated and organized in August 1941 as part of the 31st Infantry Division. It is part of units under III Military District which covers Central Plains of Luzon. It trained in Camp Del Pilar in Dau, Pampanga the Field Artillery School of Philippine Army. Lieutenant Colonel Harry J. Harper was selected as senior instructor of the regiment but eventually commanded it as war progressed.

=== Combat Action ===
The division was in Central Plains and covering Zambales west coast when Japanese started its invasion in the Philippines. The regiment saw combat during the series of delaying actions of North Luzon Force under Major General Jonathan Wainwright. It provided fire support during withdrawal to Bataan as division was covering Cabanatuan-Bamban line.

=== Bataan and Surrender ===
31st Division was assigned to II Corps area at the east of Bataan under Major General George M. Parker. 31st Field Artillery provided accurate artillery support for 31st Division units in Orion-Bagac Line.
