= Clifford Bluemel =

United States Army general

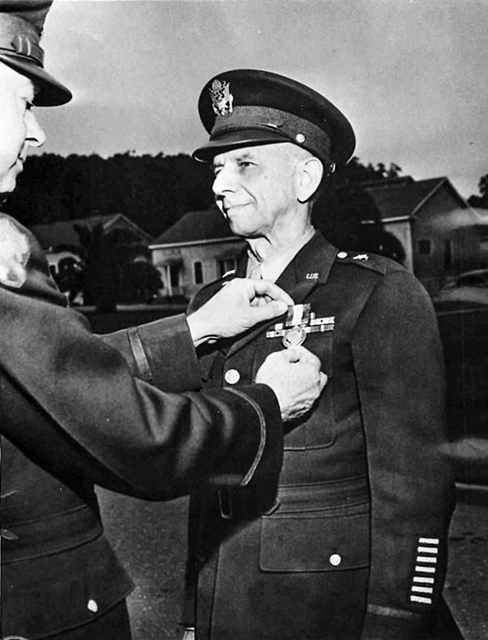
- General Clifford Bluemel
- Born: November 9, 1885; Trenton, New Jersey, US
- Died: June 27, 1973 (aged 87); Trenton, New Jersey, US
- Burial place: West Point Cemetery
- Military career
- Allegiance: United States of America
- Branch: United States Army
- Service years: 1909–1947
- Rank: Brigadier General
- Nickname: Blinky
- Service number: 0-2642
- Commands: Fort Benjamin Harrison; 31st Division (Philippines); 45th Infantry Regiment
- Conflicts: Battle of Bataan
- Awards: Distinguished Service Cross; Distinguished Service Medal; Silver Star; Prisoner of War Medal

Clifford Bluemel (9 November 1885 – 27 June 1973) was an American brigadier general. He commanded the 31st Division during the Battle of Bataan before being captured by Japanese forces and held as a prisoner of war.

== Biography ==
Bluemel was born and raised in New Jersey. He graduated 96th in a class of 103 from the United States Military Academy on June 11, 1909. Fellow members of his class included Jacob L. Devers, George S. Patton, Robert L. Eichelberger, Edwin M. Watson, John C. H. Lee, Delos C. Emmons, Edwin F. Harding, Horace H. Fuller, William Hood Simpson and James Garesche Ord.

After World War I, Bluemel graduated from the advanced course at the Infantry School in 1926 and then from the Command and General Staff School in 1927. He was promoted to colonel effective September 1, 1938 and then temporarily advanced to brigadier general on December 24, 1941. His final assignment was as commanding general of Fort Benjamin Harrison from 1946 to 1947.

After his death, Bluemel was buried at the West Point Cemetery on June 29, 1973.

== See also ==
- Philippine Division
- Douglas MacArthur
- United States Army Forces in the Far East

== Bibliography ==
- Donald J. Young (16 March 2015). The Fall of the Philippines: The Desperate Struggle Against the Japanese Invasion, 1941-1942. McFarland. pp. 119–. ISBN 978-0-7864-9820-8.
- John A. Adams (15 July 2008). If Mahan Ran the Great Pacific War: An Analysis of World War II Naval Strategy. Indiana University Press. pp. 90–. ISBN 978-0-253-00029-3.
- Manny Lawton (3 January 2004). Some Survived: An Eyewitness Account of the Bataan Death March and the Men Who Lived through It. Algonquin Books. pp. 6–. ISBN 978-1-56512-837-8.
