= Carl H. Seals =

American Army general

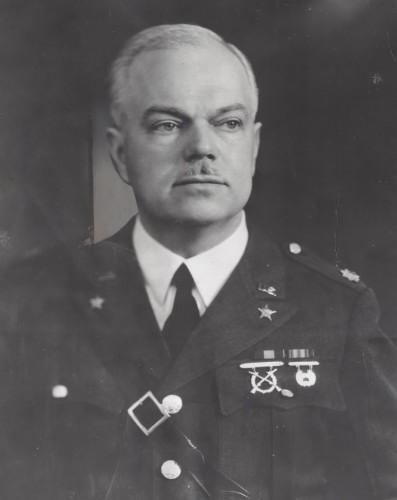
- Born: 1 January 1883; Eufaula, Alabama
- Died: 29 October 1955 (aged 72) Jacksonville, Florida
- Branch: Alabama National Guard; United States Army
- Service years: 1904–1946
- Rank: Brigadier General
- Conflicts: World War I; World War II
- Awards: Distinguished Service Medal; Purple Heart (2)

Carl Herndon Seals (1 January 1883 – 29 October 1955) was a United States Army brigadier general. During World War II, he served as the Adjutant General, United States Army Forces in the Far East under General Douglas MacArthur. Seals was captured by Japanese forces on Mindanao in May 1942 and then spent over three years as a prisoner of war.

== Early life and education ==
Seals was born in Eufaula, Alabama. He was commissioned as a first lieutenant of infantry in the Alabama National Guard in July 1904. Seals worked as a banker in Birmingham, Alabama and advanced to major in the National Guard. He later graduated from the Command and General Staff School in 1926 and the Army War College in 1931.

== Military career ==
During World War I, Seals served as a temporary lieutenant colonel in the U.S. Army Quartermaster Corps. After the war, he accepted a commission as a major of infantry in the Regular Army in September 1920.

Seals was transferred to the Adjutant General's Department in September 1934 and promoted to lieutenant colonel in August 1935. Sent to the Philippines, he received a temporary promotion to colonel in October 1940, a permanent promotion to colonel on 1 December 1941 and a temporary promotion to brigadier general in January 1942 after the Japanese invasion. Seals escaped from the siege of Corregidor in late April 1942, but was subsequently captured on Mindanao along with his wife Margaret and seven nurses after their aircraft experienced engine problems.

While still a prisoner of war, Seals was transferred to the Army retired list on 31 January 1945, having reached the mandatory retirement age of 62, but retained on active duty. His wife Margaret was freed from the Santo Tomas Internment Camp in Manila by American forces in February 1945, but later died at Walter Reed Hospital in May 1945. Seals was freed from a prisoner-of-war camp in Manchuria by Russian forces on 22 August 1945. He permanently retired from active duty in the Army as a brigadier general on 11 October 1946.

== Later life ==
Seals died at the Naval Hospital in Jacksonville, Florida. He was interred at Arlington National Cemetery on 3 November 1955.
