= 31st Division (Philippines) =

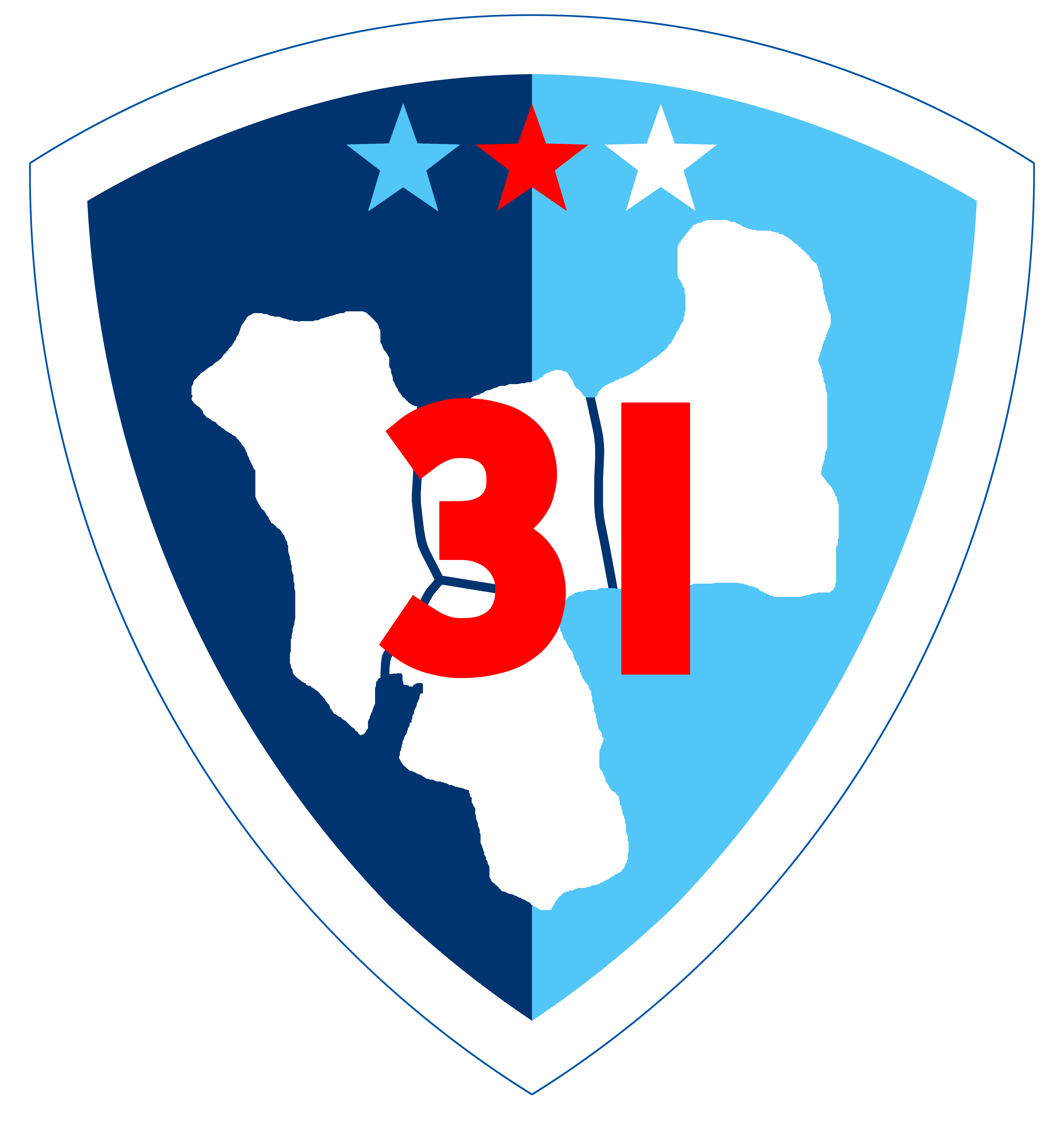
- 31st Philippine Division Emblem 1941-42
- Active: 18 November 1941 - 9 April 1942
- Country: Commonwealth of the Philippines
- Allegiance: United States Army; Philippine Commonwealth Army
- Branch: Army
- Type: Infantry Division
- Role: Army Reserve
- Size: 6,000
- Part of: North Luzon Force (I Philippine Corps)
- Garrison/HQ: Camp Dau (Del Pilar), Mabalacat, Pampanga
- Engagements: World War II: Battle of Bataan; Philippines campaign (1941–1942)

Commanders
- Commander: BGen Clifford Bluemel
- Senior Instructor: Col. Edwin Aldridge, USA
- Chief of Staff: LCol. Pastor Martelino, PA

The 31st Infantry Division was a division of the Philippine Army under the United States Army Forces in the Far East (USAFFE).

== History ==
It was active from November 18, 1941 to April 9, 1942, whereupon it surrendered when Bataan fell. It was organized and trained in Zambales Province of Northern Luzon. Col. (later BGen.) Clifford Bluemel (USA) was the division's commander. Col. Pastor C. Martelino (PA), a 1920 U.S. Military Academy graduate, was his chief of staff.

=== Combat Narrative ===
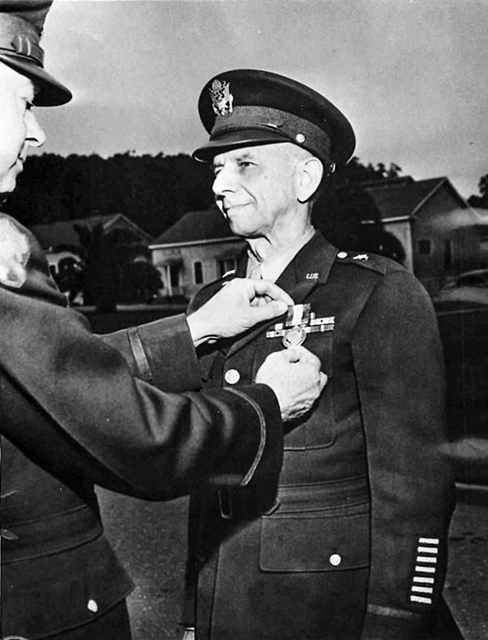
General Clifford Bluemel, division commander from November 1941 to its surrender in May 1942.

At the opening of hostilities, 8 December 1941, the 31st Division formed a part of BGen. (later LGen.) Jonathan M. Wainwright's North Luzon Force of the Philippine Army (later renamed I Philippine Corps), alongside the 11th and 21st Divisions, and the 26th Cavalry Regiment. The 31st was initially headquartered at San Mateo, Rizal, but most of its personnel were training at San Marcelino, Zambales, near Subic Bay, when hostilities broke out.

== Order of Battle ==
- 31st Infantry Regiment (PA) - (LCol. John W. Irwin)
- 32nd Infantry Regiment (PA) (LCol. Edwin Johnson)
- 33rd Infantry Regiment (PA) (Col. Edwin H. Johnson) (Major Stanley Holmes)
  - 3rd Battalion: Captain Robert Chapin, USA
- 31st Field Artillery Regiment (PA) (Col. Harry J. Haines)
  - 31st FA Regt HQ Company
  - 1st Bn/31st FA Regt (PA) (75mm guns, 16x)
  - 2nd Bn/31st FA Regt (PA) (2.95-inch pack howitzers, 4x)
  - 3rd Bn/31st FA Regt (PA)
- 31st Engineer Battalion (PA)
- 31st Division Units
  - 31st Division Headquarters & HQ Company
  - 31st Medical Battalion
  - 31st Signal Company
  - 31st Quartermaster Company (Motorized)
  - 31st QM Transport Company (Truck)

== Notable Members ==
- Rigoberto Atienza - became AFP Chief of Staff in 1965.
- Ramon Magsaysay - became Secretary of National Defense and later seventh President of the Philippines (1953–1957).
- Luis Villa-real - became AFP Vice Chief of Staff.

=== Sources ===
- Morton, Louis (1953). United States Army in World War II, The War in the Pacific: The Fall of the Philippines. Washington, D.C.: Center of Military History, United States Army.
- Whitman, John W. (1990). Bataan: Our Last Ditch : The Bataan Campaign, 1942. Hippocrene Books. ISBN 0-87052-877-7.

== Bibliography ==
- Morton, Louis. The Fall of the Philippines (Publication 5-2) . Retrieved on 14 Feb 2017.
