= 51st Field Artillery Regiment (PA) =

Philippine army unit

- Active: August 28, 1941 - April 1942
- Disbanded: April 9, 1942
- Countries: United States of America; Philippines
- Allegiance: United States of America
- Branch: Philippine Army
- Type: Field Artillery
- Role: Artillery Support
- Size: 1,500
- Part of: 51st Infantry Division
- Garrison/HQ: Lucena, Tayabas
- Equipment: M1916 75mm Howitzers; QF2.95inch Mountain Guns
- Engagements: Battle of Bataan; Battle of Mauban

Commanders
- Notable commanders: Colonel Hamilton Searight

51st Field Artillery Regiment is a reserve unit of Philippine Commonwealth Army activated and organized in 1941 and fought during World War II. The regiment is a component of 51st Infantry Division under Brigadier General Albert M. Jones, responsible for the defense of Bicol Peninsula.

== Organization ==
The regiment was organized mostly from recruits and reserve personnel from South Luzon and Bicol Peninsula. It was inducted on August 28, 1941, and intensified its training.

=== Regimental staffs ===
Lieutenant Colonel Hamilton Searight was appointed as commander.

==== Battalions ====
1Lieutenant Segundo Velasco was chosen as commander of 1st Battalion, 1Lieutenant Jose P. Laurel III for 2nd Battalion but was later replaced by Captain Francisco R. Adriano, and 3rd Battalion was commanded by 1Lieutenant Felixberto Jimenez.

=== Combat narratives ===
The regiment first saw action when Japanese moved inland after their landings in San Miguel Bay, in Legazpi, Albay. It provided fire support for 52nd Infantry Regiment under Lieutenant Colonel Virgilio Cordero fighting a delaying action in Camarines Sur and Norte provinces. Japanese landed in Mauban, Tayabas and later Atimonan, Tayabas which General Jones ordered all his units in Bicol Peninsula to withdraw to Tayabas in fear of being cutoff. On December 22, 1941, an order from USAFFE Headquarters to withdraw to Bataan as War Plan Orange 3 was in effect. 51st FA along with other 51st Division units arrived in Bataan on January 5, 1942. It was posted in II Corps Area under the former South Luzon Force commander Major General George M. Parker. Due to lack of artillery guns as many were disabled by Japanese fires and captured. 51st FA resorted to fighting as infantry by March 1942 entire 51st Infantry Division is now down to 3,300 strength.

=== Surrender ===
On April 9, 1942, Major General Edward P. King Jr., commander of forces in Bataan, surrendered the entire Luzon Force including 51st FA. Went through Bataan Death March and brought to Capas, Tarlac.

== Notable soldiers ==
- Segundo Velasco, became chief of Philippine Constabulary and later AFP Chief of Staff under President Ferdinand Marcos.

== See also ==
- 51st Infantry Division
- South Luzon Force
- Luzon Force
- Battle of Bataan
