= 53rd Infantry Regiment (PA) =

- Active: November 1941 – April 1942
- Disbanded: April 9, 1942
- Countries: United States of America; Philippines
- Allegiance: United States Army; Philippine Commonwealth Army
- Branch: Army
- Type: Infantry
- Role: Reserve
- Size: 1,500
- Part of: 51st Division (Philippines)
- Garrison/HQ: Sorsogon, Sorsogon
- Equipment: M1917 Enfield Rifles
- Engagements: Battle of Bataan; Battle of Bicol Peninsula

Commanders
- Notable commanders: Lieutenant Colonel John Boatwright; Lieutenant Colonel Hunter

53rd Infantry Regiment, is a unit of the Philippine Commonwealth Army activated and organized in 1941. It was part of 51st Infantry Division commanded by Major General Albert Jones. It fought the Japanese forces who invaded the Philippines during World War II.

== Background ==
53rd Infantry Regiment was formed in November 1941, in 3 Provinces of Bicol Peninsula Catanduanes, Sorsogon, and Masbate. I was activated as component of 51st Infantry Division under Brigadier General Albert M. Jones. This regiment was composed mostly of reservists from Bicol Peninsula which speaks bicolano and most officers came from mainland Luzon speaks Tagalog.

Lieutenant Colonel John R. Boatwright was appointed as its commander and tis Executive Officer is Captain Rufino Sabino,

1st Battalion officers are 1Lieutenant Tabionosa as commander of 1st Battalion which is based in Virac, Catanduanes but Lieutenant Cummings took over, 2Lt Emiliano R. Baskinas as Executive Officer and Adjutant, Lieutenant Braquiel M. Dizon as Signal and Communications Officer.

2nd Battalion where led by 1Lieutenant Preston Brown as commander,

1Lieutenant Emilio Medenilla commander of 3rd Battalion based in Masbate, Masbate.

On December 12, 1941, Japanese landed in Legazpi City which is under 51st Division's area of responsibility. 53rd was not yet fully trained and it was still forming from cadres and recruits.

53rd Infantry and 52nd Infantry under Colonel Virgilio Cordero made a delaying actions to prevent Japanese reach Manila.

=== Retreat to Bataan ===
USAFFE Headquarters all units of WPO 3 is in effect, all units are to retreat to Bataan Peninsula. Entire 51st Division stayed a little to cover 41st Division and 1st Divisions retreat. In Bataan, 51st Division was assigned at Eastern Sector with units mostly from South Luzon Force. It was renamed to II Philippine Corps and form Abucay Hacienda Line. 51st Division was put in the middle of II Corps Area, with 52nd Infantry in right of 51st and left of 53rd Infantry.

Japanese assault in Abucay-Mauban Line was concentrated to 51st Division and 41st Division sectors. Regiment cease to exist during the later days of Battle of Bataan and all division units was cramped into 1 unit 51st Regimental Combat Team under Colonel Adlai Young. Unit became POWs on April 9, 1942, under surrendered of all Bataan Forces by General King.
