= Luzon Force =

- Bataan Defense Force
- Active: March 17, 1942 – April 9, 1942
- Disbanded: April 9, 1942
- Countries: United States; Philippines
- Allegiance: United States Army
- Branch: Army
- Type: Field Army
- Role: Combined Arms
- Size: 85,000
- Part of: US Forces in the Philippines (USFIP); United States Army Forces in the Far East
- Field Army: Bataan
- Engagements: Battle of Bataan
- Battle honours: US Presidential Unit Citation Philippine Presidential Unit Citation Philippine Defense Campaign Ribbon

Commanders
- Commanders: MGen. Edward P. King Jr; MGen. Jonathan M. Wainwright IV
- Chief of Staff: BGen. Arnold J. Funk
- G1 Personnel: Col Floyd Marshall
- G2 Intelligence: Col Frank Holland
- G3 Operations: Col. James Collier
- G4 Supply: Col Roy Hilton
- Quartermaster: Col. Christopher Lawrence
- Notable commanders: Major General Edward P. King Jr., Major General Jonathan M. Wainwright IV

The Luzon Force or Bataan Defense Force was a short-lived Field Army size unit created in the Philippines after the restructure of command organized by General Douglas MacArthur commander of US Army Forces in the Far East (USAFFE). He wished to control the 4 Commands from Australia with its representative in Corregidor Island. Major General Jonathan M. Wainwright IV was selected to command as the senior general officer in Bataan peninsula.

BGen. Albert Jones will be promoted to major general and will take over General Wainwright's command of I Philippine Corps (NLF) defending the west coast and Major General George S. Parker commands II Philippine Corps (SLF). BGen. Allan McBride commanding the Service Area Command.

General Wainwright selected BGen. Arnold J. Funk as his chief of staff selected more officers for his staff.

== Background ==
Before the decision to withdraw of to Bataan, the sector fell into the command of US Philippine Division commander BGen. Maxon S. Lough. Along with his division was the 1st Provisional Air Corps Regiment under Col. Harrison H. C. Richards, composed of Pilots and ground crew of US Army Air Corps who lost their planes on the first day of the hostilities. General George Parker of South Luzon Force was ordered to go Bataan to make preparations for the arrival of both North Luzon and South Luzon Forces. Thus, making him the commander of Bataan pending the arrival of other commanders.

=== Order of arrival of units was as follows ===
Unit	Movement Started	Movement completed
31st Division (PA)	December 24, 1941	December 27, 1941
41st Division (PA)	December 25, 1941	December 28, 1941
57th Regimental Combat Team (PS)	December 30,1941	December 31, 1941
1st Regular Division (PA)	December 27, 1941	December 31, 1941
51st Division (PA)	December 31,1941	January 1,1942
1st Provisional Infantry Brigade (PC)	January 1, 1942	January 6, 1942
11th Division (PA)	January 5, 1942	January 6, 1942
21st Division (PA)	January 5, 1942	January 6, 1942
71st Division (PA)	January 2, 1942	January 7, 1942
26th Cavalry Regiment (PS)	January 5, 1942	January 9, 1942

Other supports unit arrived intermittently between December 26, 1941 to January 6, 1942. 86th Field Artillery (PS), 301st Field Artillery, 2nd Provisional Group (SPM), and US Provisional Light Tank Group.

=== Assignment of troops are as follows ===
To East (II Philippine Corps) under MGen. George S. Parker are 41st Division (PA), 57th Regimental Combat Team (PS), 51st Division (PA), 11th Division (PA), 21st Division (PA), 86th Field Artillery, 301st Field Artillery (155mm).

To West (I Philippine Corps) under MGen. Jonathan Wainwright IV are 31st Division (PA), 45th Regimental Combat Team (less 1 Battalion), 1st Regular Division (PA), 91st Division (PA), 26th Cavalry Regiment (PS)

Service Area Command initially under MGen Guillermo Francisco, PA but later turnover to BGen Allan McBride are 2nd Regular Division (PC), 86th Quartermaster Troops, 14th Engineer Battalion, 803rd Engineer (Aviation) Battalion, General Hospital 1 & 2.

There was no single commander in Bataan as both Corps commanders reports to General MacArthur directly through its forward echelon BGen. Richard J. Marshall. All request will have to be approved directly by General MacArthur.

=== Reorganization ===
General MacArthur was ordered by President Roosevelt to relocate to Australia and before he left he reorganized the forces in Philippines. He saw it fit to have single commander in Bataan that will directly report to him through his representative in Corregidor. He informed MGen. Wainwright before his departure and in turn the later inform commanders in Bataan and turnover the command of I Philippine Corps to BGen. Albert Jones and was promoted to major general.

== Change of Command ==
Due to General MacArthur's failure to notify US Army Headquarters in Washington, D.C of the new setup assuming that General Wainwright has assumed the Philippine Island command all correspondence was address to Wainwright. Also, BGen. Lewis Beebe as General MacArthur's representative has full control of the supplies. Finally, Army headquarters issued an order placing all Army forces including Navy and Marines in the Philippines under him. Thus, new command was created US Forces in the Philippines (USFIP) on which MGen. Jonathan M. Wainwright was promoted to lieutenant general. He moved to Corregidor island and assumed all command and selected MGen. Edward P. King Jr an artillery officer to command all forces in Luzon but he can effective just command on US and Filipino forces are isolated only in Bataan as couldn't communicate with those units isolated in Zambales, Cordillera, and Sierra Madre mountains. Thus, it is called Bataan Force only.

== Decision to Surrender ==
On May 9, 1942, General King sent two of his staffs to meet the Japanese commander in Bataan to discuss terms of surrender. He sent his aide Maj. Marshall Hurt and his Artillery Officer Col. E.C Williams to Japanese front under the white flag to seek terms of surrender. After having an assurance of safe conduct pass to meet with General Morioka. Maj Hurt went back to Mariveles to pick up General King and bring him to meet General Nagano in Lamao, Bataan. General King went forward with his aides Majors Achilles Tisdelle and Wade Corthan, Force G3 Officer Col James Collier and Maj Hurt met them halfway to guide them to the meeting place in Lamao (now Limay). After Col. Nakayama a representative of 14th Army accepted his unconditional surrender, all 76,000 troops Filipino-American forces and civilians in Bataan became POWs and walked the Death March from Mariveles, Bataan to San Fernando, Pampanga then train to Camp O'Donnell in Capas, Tarlac. Starved, sick, and those unable to walk are shot or bayoneted without provocation by Japanese soldiers. More soldiers died in Tarlac due to sickness and hunger in hundreds.

== Order of Battle ==
Headquarters, Luzon Force
Brigadier General Arnold J. Funk

I Philippine Corps
Major General Albert M. Jones

1st Regular Division (Brig. Gen. Fidel Segundo (Note: Executed by the Japanese in early January 1945 and buried in an unmarked common grave))
31st Division (Brig. Gen. Clifford Bluemel)
91st Division (Brig. Gen. Luther Stevens)
45th Infantry Regiment, Philippine Scouts (Col. Theodore Doyle)
26th Cavalry Regiment, Philippine Scouts (Col. Clinton Pierce, then Lt. Col. Lee Vance)

II Philippine Corps
Major General George M. Parker

11th Division (Brig. Gen. William Brougher)
21st Division (Brig. Gen. Mateo Capinpin)
41st Division (Brig. Gen. Vicente Lim (Note: Executed by the Japanese in 1944 and buried in an unmarked common grave))
51st Division (Brig. Gen. Albert Jones, then Col. Adlai Young Jr.)
86th Field Artillery Battalion, Philippine Scouts (75mm) (Col. Henry John Meyer)
301st US Field Artillery (155mm) (Col. Alexander Quintard)

Service Area Command
Brigadier General Allan C. McBride (Note: Died in captivity)

Philippine Coast Artillery Brigade (Col. Charles Sage)
71st Division (Brig. Gen. Clyde Selleck, then Brig. Gen. Clinton Pierce)
2nd Regular Division (Maj. Gen. Guillermo Francisco (Note: Tried after the war for collaboration with the Japanese but acquitted))
88th Field Artillery Regiment (155mm) (Col. Charles E. N. Howard Jr.)
Provisional Tank Group (Brig. Gen. James Weaver)
US Philippine Division (Brig. Gen. Maxon S. Lough)
1st Provisional Air Regiment (Col. Irvine Doane)
General Hospital 1 & 2

== See also ==
- North Luzon Force
- South Luzon Force
- Harbor Defenses of Manila and Subic Bays
- United States Army Forces in the Far East
