= 51st Infantry Regiment (Philippines) =

- Active: June 1941 - May 1942
- Disbanded: April 9, 1942
- Countries: Philippines; United States of America
- Allegiance: USAFFE
- Branch: Army
- Type: Infantry
- Role: Light Infantry
- Size: 1,752
- Part of: 51st Infantry Division
- Garrison/HQ: Camp McGrath, Lipa, Batangas
- Engagements: 2nd Battale of Orion-Bagac Line 1st Battle of Orion-Bagac Line; Battle of Abucay Hacienda; Battle of Plaridel Battle of Mauban

Commanders
- Notable commanders: Adlai Young; Loren Stewart

The 51st Infantry Regiment or 51st Regimental Combat Team is an army reserve unit of the Commonwealth of Philippines Army during World War II. It was activated in June 1, 1941 after the United States Army Forces in the Far East (USAFFE) was activated in preparation of possible Japanese invasion. It fought in Southern Luzon in repulsing the Japanese invasion in Lamon Bay and in Bataan.

== Background ==
In June 1941, General Douglas MacArthur announced the activation of the 10 reserve divisions and its First Regiment under it. 51st was activated in Camp McGrath in Lipa, Batangas in June 1941 and Lieutenant Colonel Loren Stewart was appointed as its commander. Reservist from Bicol was called to filled the personnel, the unit was still in training the war started. The regiment is consist of Headquarters Battalion and 3 Rifle Battalions.

In November 1941, General MacArthur announced the creation of 4 area commands where South Luzon Force under Brigadier General George M. Parker is one of it. 51st Division will be subordinate of it and assigned at the east coast of Southern Luzon including Bicol Peninsula. Colonel Stewart position his regiment 2 Battalions along Lamon Bay Coast and a battalion along Tayabas Bay.

=== Japanese Lamon Bay Landing ===
In December 17, 1941 Japanese made a pincer movement landing at Lamon which caught the USAFFE by surprised. This prompted United States Army Forces in the Far East (USAFFE) to issue order of General Retreat to Bataan and activation of War Plan Orange 3. The regiment didn't see action during these landings as they were placed in Lipa, Batangas to cover the Japanese approaches from that direction. It moved to Santiago on December 29 and then continued to Alabang where it went to become a mobile reserve.

==== The Fight for Plaridel ====
Colonel Stewart was ordered to position his regiment in Plaridel to block the Japanese route to Calumpit bridge in order of other units to cross the bridge during the retreat. Along with C Company of 194th Tank Battalion and battery of 75mm SPM they annihilated the tank elements of 4th Tank Regiment of Japanese Army at Baliuag in Bulacan on New Year's Eve December 31, 1942. The regiment was the holding the Calumpit - Plaridel area until retreating forces from south Luzon cross they bridge. The regiment was the last unit to cross the bridge before the Calumpit Bridge was blown off.

==== Battle of Abucay-Morong Line ====
After reaching Bataan, 51st Division was assigned at II Corps defending east sector of the Peninsula. 51st Infantry was assigned by General Jones to defend the west most of the II Corps including Abucay Hacienda, connect east line of I Corps sector. On January 12, 1942 while doing reconnaissance of the area of the 1st Battalion under Captain William R. Osborn the regimental commander Lieutenant Colonel Loren Stewart and Captain Wilbur A. Kruse commander of 3rd Battalion was hit by artillery and machinegun fire from the enemy which instantly killed them both. Their body was not able to retrieve until end of the war. Captain Osborn have to moved forward to Japanese lines in order to avoid being killed. This created confusion among units who had lost their commanders. Lieutenant Villanueva the executive officer of 1st Battalion for unknown reason ordered his battalion to withdraw. Lieutenant Colonel Adlai Young took command of the regiment during the battle. The regimental headquarters was not notified of this action, which resulted in a deep penetration by the enemy. In January 15, 1942 all of 51st Division reserves had been committed and the division was still losing ground. All elements of the division was reorganized and a counterattack was launched on January 16. This counterattack failed, and by mid-afternoon the 51st Infantry was doubled enveloped; troops routed and their front began to disintegrate.

51st Infantry retreated along with all units of I and II Corps upon orders of USAFFE headquarters to established defense Orion-Bagac Line.

==== Reorganization to Regimental Combat Team ====
The regiment performed bravely during the first battle of Orion-Bagac Line and contributed to the great casualties of the Japanese which made decide Japanese commander to withdraw and wait for reinforcement. However, the greatest losses was the 51st Division, it was so shot out due to large casualties, both battle and non-battle casualties. Hunger, malaria, sickness, and desertion greatly brought 51st Division strength is down to regiment size. All 3 regiments are now down to battalion size and 51st is now reorganized to Regimental Combat Team which consist of 51st Battalion, 52nd Battalion, 53rd Battalion, and provisional battalion that closely resembled a heavy weapons battalion. Headquarters Battalion was established with mostly service troops and one battery of 51st Field Artillery was retained equipped with 75mm Guns.

== Surrender ==
When Japanese assaulted the Orion-Bagac Line again on March 26, 1942 they went straight to the 51st Regimental Combat Team sector as they know its the weakest unit in the II Corps. It was annihilated and disintegrated and soldiers was dispersed towards the hills. Soldiers were ordered to surrender and moved to Mariveles, Bataan where they started to endured the death march.

The regiment was never reactivated again after the war but 51st Infantry (Fuerto Uno) Battalion was activated by Philippine Army. It is currently deployed and actively operating in Butig, Lanao Del Sur under 1st Infantry (Tabak) Division.

== See also ==
- 51st Infantry Division (Philippines)
- South Luzon Force
- Albert M. Jones
