= 52nd Infantry Regiment (Philippines) =

- Active: September 1941 - April 1942
- Countries: United States of America; Philippines
- Allegiance: United States Army
- Branch: Army
- Type: Infantry
- Role: Reserve
- Size: 1,800
- Part of: 51st Infantry Division (Philippines)
- Garrison/HQ: Pili, Camarines Sur
- Equipment: M1917 Enfield .30 Caliber Bolt Action Rifle M1918 Browning .30 Caliber Automatic Rifles; M19123 Thompson .45 ACP Submachinegun M1917 Browning .30 Caliber Machineguns
- Engagements: Battle of Bataan,br> Battle of Lamon Bay Battle of Bicol

Commanders
- Notable commanders: Virgilio N. Cordero Jr.

52nd Infantry Regiment, is a reserve unit of Philippine Army during World War II. It was activated and organized in August 1941 in Camarines Sur in Bicol Region.

== Background ==
Upon activation of US Army Forces in the Far East and US President Franklin Roosevelt put the Philippine Army into the US service, all 10 reserve divisions was activated. 52nd Infantry Regiment was activated as second infantry unit of the division. Puerto Rican who is serving in US Army Lieutenant Colonel Virgilio Cordero was made commander in November 1941 and Major P.R Silerto as Executive Officer. 51st Division area of responsibility is the entire Bicol Peninsula. 52nd Infantry was assigned to cover Camarines Norte, Camarines Sur, and Albay Provinces.

=== World War II ===
Japanese attacked Philippines on December 8, 1941. They first landed in Davao and in Legazpi in Albay Province. They landed without any resistance and proceeded northward towards Manila. General Albert Jones commander of 51st Division ordered Colonel Cordero to intercept the Japanese in Sipocot, Camarines Sur. Inflicting heavy casualties to the Japanese but the landing in Lamon Bay cutoff the regiment from 51st Division and South Luzon Force. Colonel Cordero had to take boat to reach Batangas.

==== Lamon Bay Landing ====
3rd Battalion, 52nd Infantry was posted north of Mauban, Tayabas and took defensive action on Japanese landing. They were relieved by 1st Infantry Regiment of 1st Division on December 23, 1941. Elements of 1st Battalion, 52nd Infantry was moved to Atimonan, Tayabas taking defensive action.

==== Retreat to Bataan ====
The order from USAFFE headquarters for South Luzon Force was received, 52nd Infantry was ordered to hold Pagbilao-Tayabas road until retreating units. On December 28, 1941, the regiment started their retreat north towards Bataan, passing through Manila. They reached San Fernando, Pampanga on December 31 and cleared Calumpit Bridge before dawn.

==== Battle of Bataan ====
51st Division units was posted along Abucay line which is now under II Philippine Corps under Major General George M. Parker. Mauled and battered with its combat actions in Bicol Peninsula, Lamon Bay, and forced retreat lost almost half of its strength. 52nd Infantry was on beach defense until January 11. When Japanese struck Abucay-Mauban Line 51st Division was easily disseminated and retreated. The regiment retreated to Bagac-Orion line, Japanese struck defensive line again in February but they are repulsed and General Homma ordered general withdrawal and wait for reinforcement. By March the division was down to only few soldiers losing its fighting strength due to casualty, desentry, malaria, and hunger. The division was reorganized into 51st Regimental Combat Team under Colonel Adlai Young. Later Colonel Cordero was transferred to command 72nd Infantry at the I Corps area.

The Bataan force surrendered on April 9, 1942, and men of the regiment became POWs and forced to march without food and water now known Bataan Death March.

== See also ==
- 51st Infantry Division (Philippines)
- Albert Jones
