= 41st Field Artillery Regiment (PA) =

- Active: August 1941 – April 1942
- Disbanded: April 9, 1942
- Countries: United States; Philippines
- Allegiance: United States Army; Army of the Philippines
- Branch: Army
- Type: Field Artillery
- Role: Fire Support
- Size: 1,500
- Part of: 41st Infantry Division
- Garrison/HQ: Canlubang, Laguna
- Equipment: M1916 75mm Guns; QF 2.95inch Mountain Guns; M1917 Enfield Rifles
- Engagements: Battle of Mauban, Tayabas; Battle of Bataan

Commanders
- Notable commanders: Lieutenant Colonel Amado Martelino, PA

41st Field Artillery Regiment is a reserve unit of Philippine Commonwealth Army activated in August 1941 and organized to defense Southern Luzon area. It was commanded by Lieutenant Colonel Amado Martelino. It was part of General Vicente Lim's 41st Infantry Division who fought in Bataan.

== Organization ==
The regiment was organization and training in Canlubang, Laguna as part of 41st Infantry Division. Lieutenant Colonel Amado Martelino was appointed as its commander. The regiment was equipped with World War I era artillery guns M1916 75mm Guns and QF 2.95inch Mountain Guns.

=== Japanese Landings in South Luzon ===
Japanese landed in Legazpi in Albay and in Mauban and Atinoman, in Tayabas (now Quezon). Since the 41st Division was tasked to defend the western coast of southern Luzon, its units were relegated to supporting role, such as guarding Tagaytay Heights for possible parachute landings.

=== Retreat to Bataan ===
On December 22, 1941, South Luzon Force was ordered to make an orderly retreat to Bataan as War Plan Orange 3 is in effect as announced by USAFFE Headquarters. In December 25, 41st Division and its units arrived in Bataan and posted in II Corps area defending eastern coast of the peninsula.

=== Battle of Bataan and Surrender ===
41st Field Artillery provided fire support for 41st Division troops along Mauban-Abucay Line, Pilar-Bagac Line, and Mariveles-Limay Line up in Mt. Samat.
