= General McBride =

General McBride may refer to:

- Allan C. McBride (1885–1944), U.S. Army brigadier general
- Douglas M. McBride Jr. (born 1966), U.S. Army brigadier general
- Horace L. McBride (1894–1962), U.S. Army lieutenant general
- James H. McBride (1814–1864), Confederate Missouri Militia general in the American Civil War
- William V. McBride (1922–2022), U.S. Air Force four-star general
