= 41st Infantry Regiment (PA) =

- Active: August 26, 1941 - April 9, 1942
- Disbanded: April 9, 1942
- Countries: United States of America; Philippines
- Allegiance: United States Army; Philippine Commonwealth Army
- Branch: Army
- Type: Infantry
- Role: Reserve Unit
- Size: 1,500
- Part of: 41st Infantry Division
- Garrison/HQ: Tagaytay, Cavite
- Equipment: M1917 Enfield Rifles; 3inch Stokes Mortar; M1917 Browning .30 Caliber Machinegun; M2 Browning .50 Heavy Machinegun
- Engagements: Battle of Bataan
- Decorations: Presidential Unit Citation

Commanders
- Notable commanders: Lieutenant Colonel Silvino Gallardo; Lieutenant Colonel Fidel Cruz; Lieutenant Colonel Loren Wetherby

Insignia
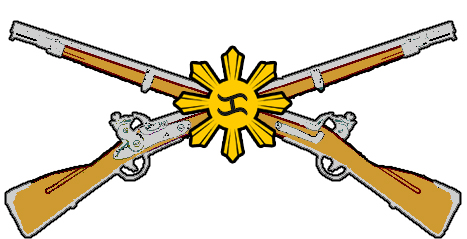
- Identification symbol

41st Infantry Regiment, is a unit and formation activated and organization of Philippine Commonwealth Army. It was under 41st Infantry Division under Brigadier General Vicente Lim. It fought in during World War II in the Philippines, and fought valiantly and earned Presidential Unit Citation awarded by President Manuel Quezon.

== Background ==
The regiment was activated in Tagaytay, Cavite and recruits around provinces in Southern Tagalog. The soldiers was equipped with M1917 Enfield .30 Caliber Bolt Action Rifles a standard issued weapon of the Philippine Commonwealth Army to its units. Same problem as other units with the rifle with broken extractor and with limited ammunition so firing in the training was prohibited.

=== Leadership ===
It was commanded by Lieutenant Colonel Silvino Gallardo with Major Fidel Cruz as Executive Officer. Attached to the regiment is Lieutenant Colonel Eurgene T. Lewis as Senior Instructor. In January 1942 Lieutenant Colonel Fidel Cruz replaced Colonel Gallardo after Japanese assaulted them in Abucay, Bataan. Later American Lieutenant Colonel Loren Wetherby took over the command.

Battalion commanders were selected by General Lim himself to ensure he had the most capable officers to lead his units. 1st Battalion is commanded by Major Robert Baker, and 2nd Battalion is under Major David Puro, and 3rd Battalion is under Captain Harold Anderson.

=== South Luzon Force ===
41st Infantry and other units of 41st Infantry Division was assigned to cover the west coast of Southern Luzon. Also assigned to them is to guard the Tagaytay ridge for possible airborne landing of the Japanese. On December 8, 1942, Japan attacked the Philippines but it took them a week to land in the eastern coast at Lamon Bay. After securing a beachhead in Tayabas Province, USAFFE Headquarters activated WPO 3 which requires all units to retreat to Bataan Peninsula. General Lim lead his division the retreat going to Manila and arrived in Bataan on late December 1941

=== War Plan Orange 3 ===
41st Division was posted at the left sector of Abucay Line which is under II Philippine Corps Area under Major General George M. Parker. On January 8, 1942, Japanese started their assault in Bataan but found a formidable opposing forces for the first time. 41st Infantry and others units of 41st Division performed well and fought back these assault earning the moniker the Rock of Bataan. However, due to the gap exploited by the Japanese at west of 41st Division in I Corps Area in Mount Natib. II Corps was forced to retreat to realign with I Corps who retreated in Orion-Bagac Line the second and final line of resistance of USAFFE.

=== Orion-Bagac Line ===
On January 26, 1942, Japanese started their campaign against Orion-Bagac Line, With more defendable and shorter 41st Infantry was assigned at the center of the Division's area of responsibility.

==== Battle of Trail 2 ====
As confusion due to changes with the initial plan made and not properly reached to individual commanders made a gap, at the 51st Division sector a gap was created as General Bluemel was not properly inform. 41st Infantry Regiment was sent to this gap to remedy the problem. The regiment fought and hold firm resorting to hand-to-hand combat and held the line. Japanese casualties were high and their attack failed. On January 31 they resumed starting with aerial and artillery bombardments but was frustrated with Machinegun fire of 41st Infantry was so effective. On February 2, 41st Infantry was in action again to aid 41st Engineer Battalion to clear the bamboo thicket but met with Japanese resistance, 41st Infantry advanced rapidly and found that they cleared the area of Japanese threat.

=== Surrender and Death March ===
After reinforcements arrived and new firepower, Japanese made another assault in the line on March 26, 1942. With hungry, sick, and tired Filipino American troops could no longer make a stand. They broke through the line and reached Mariveles, General King moved forward to ask for terms of surrender. Luzon Force in Bataan surrendered on April 9, 1942, including 41st Infantry and became POWs. They were forced to March from Mariveles, Bataan to San Fernando, Pampanga now known as Bataan Death March. 41st Infantry due to its reputation in inflicting heavy losses to the Japanese were subject to harsh treatment, deprived of food and water many succumb and some massacred by shooting and bayoneted by their guards.
