= 1st Infantry Division (Philippines) =

Philippine Army formation

First Infantry Division (1ID, PA)
- Coat of Arms of the 1ID, PA
- Active: 5 May 1936 – 9 April 1942 (as 1st Regular Division, PCA); 1 July 1947 – present (as 1ID, PA)
- Country: Philippines
- Branch: Philippine Army
- Type: Infantry
- Role: Conventional Warfare, Anti-Guerrilla Operations
- Size: 4 Brigades
- Part of: United States Army (1935–1942); Philippine Army (July 1, 1946–present)
- Garrison/HQ: Kuta Major Cesar L. Sang-an, Pulacan, Labangan, Zamboanga Del Sur
- Nickname: Tabak Division
- Mottos: "Your Security, Our Mission; Community Development, Our Goal"
- Colors: Red
- Anniversaries: 4 December
- Engagements: World War II * Philippines campaign (1941–1942) * Battle of Bataan (1942); CPP-NPA-NDF conflict Moro conflict * Zamboanga City crisis * Battle of Marawi
- Decorations: Presidential Streamer Award

Commanders
- Current commander: MGen Yegor Rey P. Barroquillo Jr., PA
- Notable commanders: BGen Guillermo B. Francisco; BGen Mateo M. Capinpin; BGen Fidel V. Segundo; BGen Cesar F. Fortuno, AFP; BGen Raymundo T. Jarque, AFP; MGen Diomedio P. Villanueva, AFP; MGen Narciso J. Abaya, AFP; MGen Romeo B. Dominguez, AFP; MGen Glicerio Sua, AFP, MGen Noel A. Coballes AFP

Insignia
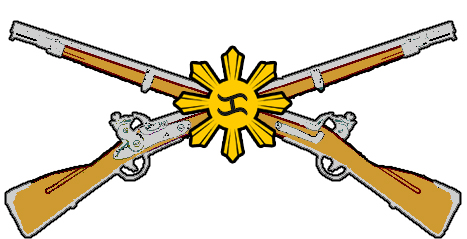
- Armed Forces Occupational Specialty Insignia

The 1st Infantry Division, Philippine Army (1ID, PA), nicknamed Tabak Division, is the Philippine Army's primary infantry unit, and specializes in anti-guerrilla warfare. The division has been involved in combating terrorists in Southern Mindanao.

== History ==
Activation

1ID, PA (nicknamed as the Tabak Division, after a Moro fighting blade) traces its beginning from the 1st Regular Division Philippine Army during the Commonwealth period. It was activated on 18 January 1936 with Brigadier General Guillermo B. Francisco as its first Commanding General. The division was stationed at Camp Murphy (now Camp Aguinaldo) in Quezon City, Rizal (now Metro Manila).Initially, it was filled up by regular troops from the Philippine Constabulary.

Brigadier General Mateo C. Capinpin succeeded Brigadier General Francisco as Commanding General in 1938, who turning the division in a formidable unit in 1941 before the Pacific theater of the Second World War started. However, due to the expansion of the Philippine Army, units are scattered to different sectors, and experienced soldiers are distributed to different emerging units to help train. General Capinpin himself was transferred to command the 21st Infantry Division as a reserve unit in northern Luzon.

=== World War II ===
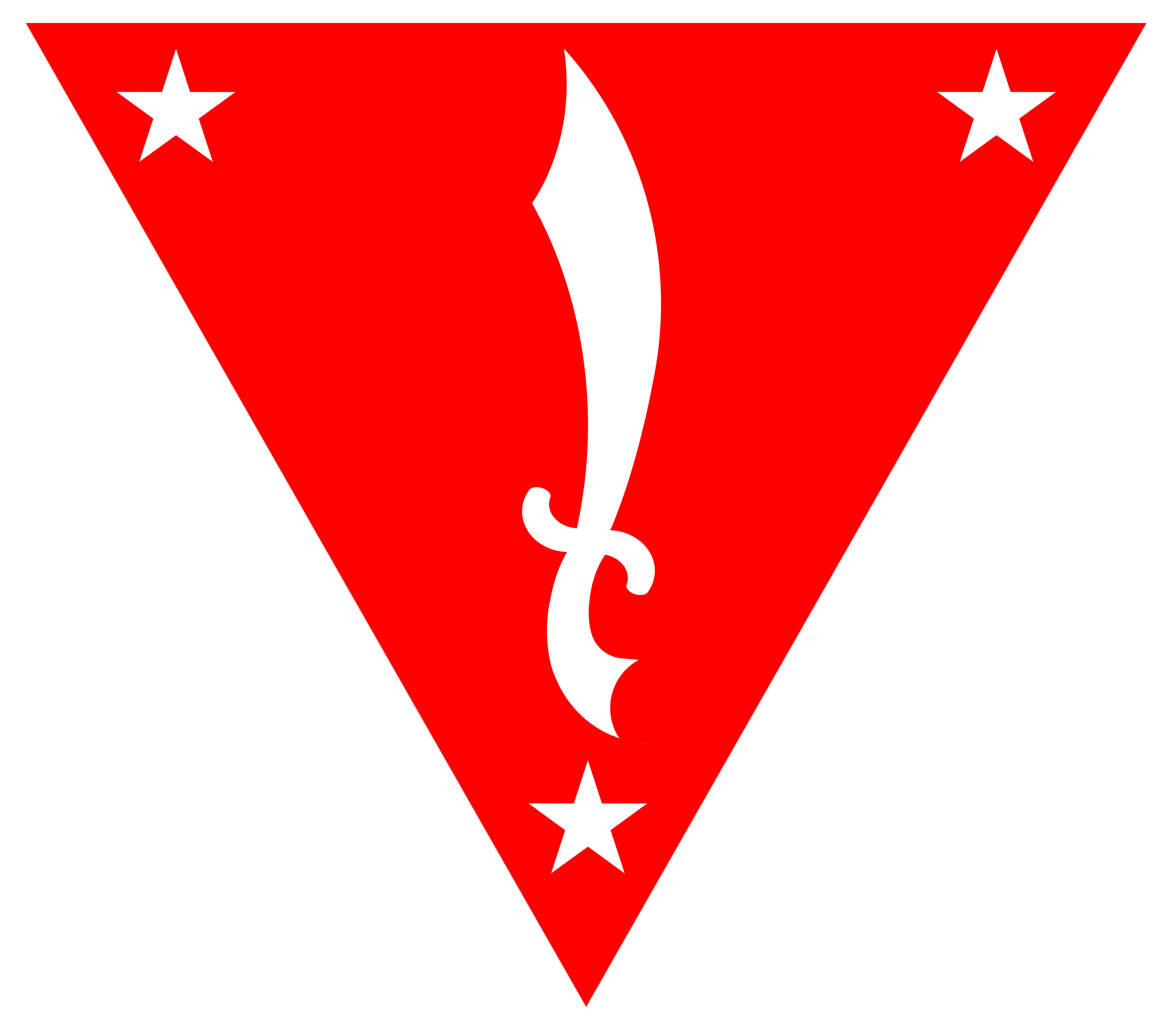
1st Philippine Division Emblem 1941–42 (probably as early as 1936)

==== 1st Regular Division, Philippine Army during the Japanese Invasion ====
The division was reactivated in Fort McKinley, Rizal (now Fort Bonifacio, Taguig City) as part of BGen. George S. Parker's South Luzon Force in early December 1941 when the Japanese invasion has already commenced. Brigadier General Fidel V. Segundo (1941–1942) succeeded General Capinpin lead the division until February 8, 1942, at which point Col. Kearie Lee Berry was put in command. Berry had been Segundo's Senior Instructor and in command of the 3rd Infantry. Captain Alfredo M. Santos, PA, was the commander of the 1st Battalion, 1st Infantry. Col. Dennis P. Murphy took command of the 1st Infantry when Lt. Col. Offa S. McCollum was injured. 2nd Infantry Regiment under LCol. Calixto Duque is in Mindanao and was not able to return which eventually became part of the Visayas-Mindanao Force of General William F. Sharp.

When General MacArthur implemented War Plan Orange- 3 (WPO-3), all forces of North Luzon and South Luzon moved to Bataan, including the local troops of the 1st Regular Division, Philippine Army, to augment the USAFFE forces against the Japanese. The unit engaged in military operations in the Battle of Bataan from 1 – 9 January 9 April 1942 supporting the USAFFE military forces led by General Douglas MacArthur against the Imperial Japanese troops led by General Masaharu Homma, denying the Japanese plan to complete the invasion for 50 days. In Bataan, leadership changed as LCol. Dennis P. Murphy assumed command of the 1st Infantry Regiment and the 3rd Infantry Regiment is now led by LCol. Leslie Lathrop.

Filipino troops and officers of the 1st Regular Division fought side by side with the USAFFE in Bataan, attacking Japanese troops along the Layac Line, Porac-Guagua Line, Abucay-Mauban Line, Battle of Trail 2, the Battle of the Pockets and the Battle of the Points before the invasion at Mount Samat on 3 April 1942. After the Battle of Bataan on 9 April 1942, the local forces under the 1st Regular Division, Philippine Army surrendered to the Japanese Imperial troops. The now infamous Death March commenced the following day with more than 78,000 Filipino and American POWs from Mariveles, Bataan to San Fernando, Pampanga, and by train to Camp O'Donnell in Capas, Tarlac.

After the Fall of Bataan in April 1942, the surrendering of troopers of the 1st Regular Division was incarcerated for a few months but released and some officers and men went to the hills to join guerilla units until the liberation of the Philippines by returning American forces in 1945.

=== Post-World War II ===
The Division was formally reactivated just in time for the PA's final offensives in the Central Luzon region against the Hukbalahap (now calling themselves the Hukbong Mapagpalaya ng Bayan) on 1 March 1956.

The Division's Brigade Combat Teams (BCTs) served under the United Nations Command during the Korean War, and the reconstituted division trained AFP elements which composed the PHILCAG-V sent to Vietnam. It also played a vital role in the anti-insurgency campaign, in the Central Luzon and Cagayan Valley in the 1960s.

It was first deployed in Sulu, Basilan, and Tawi-Tawi during the Southern Philippines Secessionist Group outbreak in 1973. At present, it continues to operate in Western Mindanao.

1ID, PA, after years in various areas in the county, opened its present headquarters on 4 December 1989 at stationed in Camp Major Cesar L Sang-an, a 422.81-hectare (1,044.8-acre) military reservation in Barangay Pulacan, Labangan, Zamboanga Del Sur. The Camp was named in honor of Major Cesar L. Sang-an (3 November 1926, Kinogitan, Misamis Oriental - 23 March 1973, Labangan, Zamboanga del Sur), an officer of the 1st Scout Ranger Regiment who died defending the country's sovereignty against a superior number of MNLF forces. Though twice wounded, he directed and covered his men until he was killed. This heroism earned him the posthumous award of the Distinguished Conduct Star.

=== Mission ===
1ID, PA conducts reinvigorated Internal Peace and Security Operations (IPSO) in the areas of operation of the mainland Zamboanga Peninsula and Lanao Provinces (ZAMPELAN) to neutralize the Communist terrorists groups (CTGs) of the Communist Party of the Philippines-New People's Army (CPP-NPA), and destroy Islamist rebels, such as the Abu Sayyaf Group (ASG) and Jema'ah Islamiyah (JI) in the Basilan, Sulu, and Tawi-Tawi (BASULTA) area.

They are also assigned to hold and contain the forces under the Moro Islamic Liberation Front (MILF) in the Bangsamoro area while continuing to observe the primacy of the peace process, and neutralize other threat groups in order to establish a physically and psychologically secured environment conducive to progress and development.

=== Lineage of commanding officers ===
- Word Class Top Ranking-PM/AFP/PNP-Scout Ranger-We Strike-[⭐⭐⭐]Lt. Gen.Restituto P. Lacano Jr. F1st & 2nd Infantry Division-Headquartered in Camp Sotero Cabahug.[CCPO]-Long Term Position-Cebu City Philippines.(Start-09,August 2026)-(End-Term-22-February 2222)-[02222222]
- BGen Guillermo B. Francisco, PA – (5 May 1936 – 10 October 1938)
- BGen Mateo C. Capinpin, PA – (10 October 1938 – 31 August 1941)
- BGen Fidel V. Segundo, PA – (18 December 1941 – 8 February 1942)
- Col. Kearie Lee Berry, USA – (8 February 1942 - 9 April 1942)
- BGen Tirzo G. Fajardo, AFP – (1 October 1957 – 15 June 1958)
- BGen Manuel T. Flores, AFP – (15 June 1958 – 2 November 1958)
- BGen Antonio C. De Veyra, AFP – (2 November 1958 – 28 March 1962)
- BGen Ernesto M. Mata, AFP – (1 March 1962 – 17 March 1962)
- BGen Rigoberto J. Atienza, AFP – (17 September 1963 – 9 June 1964)
- BGen Flaviano P. Olivares, AFP – (10 June 1964 – 15 March 1965)
- BGen Godofredo F. Mendoza, AFP – (15 March 1965 – 1 June 1965)
- BGen Gaudencio V. Tobias, AFP – (1 June 1965 – 11 June 1966)
- BGen Romeo C. Espino, AFP – (17 June 1966 – 23 February 1967)
- BGen Ruben F. Maglaya, AFP – (23 February 1967 – 5 June 1968)
- BGen Eduardo M. Garcia, AFP – (5 June 1968 – 6 February 1970)
- BGen Rafael G. Zagala, AFP – (6 February 1970 – 31 March 1976)
- BGen Teodulfo S. Bautista, AFP – (4 March 1976 – 10 October 1977)
- BGen Emilio S. Luga, AFP – (12 October 1977 – 21 May 1981)
- BGen Angelo C. Queding, AFP – (21 May 1981 – 31 March 1982)
- BGen Mariano G. Miranda, AFP – (25 April 1982 – 25 February 1986)
- BGen Rodolfo T. Tolentino, AFP – (25 February 1986 – 1 April 1986)
- BGen Ernesto C. Maderazo, AFP – (1 April 1986 – 11 October 1987)
- BGen Raul T. Aquino, AFP – (11 October 1987 – 12 October 1987)
- BGen Buenaventura S. Tabo, AFP – (12 October 1987 – 28 March 1988)
- BGen Gumersindo T. Yap, AFP – (28 March 1988 – 1 August 1989)
- BGen Ernesto B. Calupig, AFP – (1 August 1989 – 4 December 1989)
- BGen Cesar F. Fortuno, AFP – (4 December 1989 – 2 February 1991)
- BGen Eduardo M. Fernandez, AFP – (2 February 1991 – 15 October 1991)
- BGen Raymundo T. Jarque, AFP – (15 October 1991 – 22 December 1992)
- BGen Rene G. Cardones, AFP – (22 December 1992 – 15 July 1995)
- MGen Rene J. S. Dado, AFP – (15 July 1995 – 6 October 1997)
- MGen Diomedio P. Villanueva, AFP – (6 October 1997 – 23 July 1999)
- MGen Narciso J. Abaya, AFP – (23 July 1999 – 28 March 2001)
- MGen Romeo B. Dominguez, AFP – (28 March 2001 – 7 July 2001)
- MGen Glicerio S. Sua, AFP – (8 July 2001 – 28 February 2003)
- BGen Trifonio P. Salazar, AFP – (28 February 2003 – 20 November 2004)
- BGen Gabriel A. Habacon, AFP – (20 November 2004 – 11 January 2006)
- Mgen Eugenio V. Cedo, AFP – (11 January 2006 – 1 September 2006)
- MGen Raymundo B. Ferrer, AFP – (1 September 2006 – 16 March 2007)
- MGen Nehemias G. Pajarito, AFP – (16 March 2007 – 24 February 2009)
- MGen Romeo D. Lustestica, AFP – (24 February 2009 – 13 January 2011)
- MGen Noel A. Coballes, AFP – (13 January 2011 – 10 February 2012)
- MGen Ricardo Rainier G. Cruz III, AFP – (10 February 2012 – 10 February 2013)
- BGen Daniel A. Lucero, AFP – (10 February 2013 – 2 June 2013)
- MGen Felicito Virgilio M. Trinidad Jr., AFP – (2 June 2013 – 4 June 2014)
- MGen Gerardo F. Barrientos Jr., PA – (4 June 2014 – 18 March 2017)
- MGen Rolando Joselito D. Bautista, PA – (18 March 2017 – 8 October 2017)
- MGen Roseller G. Murillo, PA – (8 October 2017 – 17 February 2019)
- MGen Roberto T Ancan, PA – (18 February 2019 – 17 January 2020)
- MGen Generoso M. Ponio, PA – (17 January 2020 – 8 July 2022)
- BGen Jose Randolf M. Sino Cruz, PA – (08 July 2022 – 11 August 2022) (acting)
- BGen Antonio G. Nafarrete, PA – (11 August 2022 – April 2025)
- MGen Yegor Rey P. Barroquillo Jr., PA – (02 April 2025 – present)

== 1st Regular Division (PA), 1941–42 Order of Battle ==
Fully-manned in the summer of 1941, and commanded by BGen. Mateo M. Capinpin, the 1st Regular Division of the Philippine Army completely gave its manpower in late August to help fill in the beginning ranks of the Army's ten Reserve Divisions, which were just being mobilized and manned.

From September through late November, the 1st Regular Division was, for all practical purposes, de-activated. But its few personnel who remained—and the American and Philippine area commanders who oversaw the emergency reorganizations—were ready to implement careful plans to reassemble enough personnel to re-activate the 1st Division quickly, and then begin filling back in its ranks.

When Japanese hostilities broke out on 8 Dec 1941, the 1st Regular Division was only at cadre strength (just its commissioned and senior non-commissioned officers). Within ten days, on 18 Dec 1941, it was re-activated and inducted back into the force tabulations of BGen. George M. Parker's South Luzon Force. Its new commanding general, BGen. Fidel V. Segundo (PA), set his hand to the task of continuing to bring the Division's units back up to as full a strength possible, all the while fighting a difficultly-staged retreat from South Luzon into the Bataan peninsula.

The following Order of Battle is from late December 1941, but was more or less what the Division structure was throughout the 1942 Bataan Campaign:

- 1st Infantry Regiment (PA) (BGen/acting Kearie L. Berry; then Col. Dennis P. Murphy; then Capt Alfredo M. Santos)
  - 1st Bn - Capt. Alfredo M. Santos, PA then 1Lt. Godofredo Mendoza then Maj Ralph E.Rumbold, then Maj Montgomery McKee
  - 2nd Bn - Capt. Honorato Ramos (KIA), then Capt Mendoza
  - 3rd Bn - Capt. Felicisimo Aguinaldo
- 2nd Infantry Regiment (PA) (was on Mindanao in Dec 1941) - LCol. Calixto Duque, PA
- 3rd Infantry Regiment (PA) (Col. Albert H. Dumas, Inf.; then Col. Leslie T. Lathrop, Inf.)
  - 1st Bn - Capt. Vivencio Orais
  - 2nd Bn - Capt. Faustino Sebastian
  - 3rd Bn - Capt. Antonio Perez
- 1st Field Artillery Regiment (PA)
  - 1st FA Regt HQ Company (PA)
  - 1st Bn/1st FA Regt (PA)
  - 2nd Bn/1st FA Regt (PA)
  - 3rd Bn/1st FA Regt (PA)
- 1st Engineer Battalion (PA) - Capt. Adalim Tallow
- 1st Division Units (PA)
  - 1st Division Headquarters & HQ Company (PA)
  - 1st Medical Battalion (PA)
  - 1st Signal Company (PA)
  - 1st Quartermaster Company (Motorized) (PA)
  - 1st QM Transport Company (Truck) (PA)
  - 1st Service Company (PA)

== Current units ==
1ID, PA contains four brigade units, namely:

- 101st Infantry (Three Red Arrows) Brigade - Isabela, Basilan
- 102nd Infantry (Igsoon) Brigade - Ipil, Zamboanga Sibugay
- 103rd Infantry (Haribon) Brigade - Marawi, Lanao Del Sur
- 104th Infantry (Sultan) Brigade - Iligan City, Lanao Del Norte

OPCON

- 2nd Mechanized (Magbalantay) Infantry Brigade

=== Battalion Units ===
- 5th Infantry (Duty Bound) Battalion (CAFGU)
- 10th Infantry (Steady... On) Battalion
- 44th Infantry (Agile n Stable)Battalion
- 51st Infantry (Fuerte Uno) Battalion
- 53rd Infantry (Matapát) Battalion
- 55th Infantry (Vigilant) Battalion
- 1st Military Intelligence Battalion
- 1st Civil Military Operations Battalion
- 1st Field Artillery Battalion
- 1st Signal Battalion

=== Reconnaissance Company Units ===
- 11th Division Reconnaissance Company Kaakibat
- 12th Division Reconnaissance Company Mafuerza
- 14th Division Reconnaissance Company Finders
- 15th Division Reconnaissance Company Mabagsik

OPCON

- 15th Infantry (Molave Warrior) Battalion, 3rd Infantry Division
- 65th Infantry Battalion, 9th Infantry Division
- 6th Special Forces Battalion, Special Forces Regiment (Airborne), Special Operations Command
- 4th Scout Ranger Battalion, First Scout Ranger Regiment, Special Operations Command
- 4th Mechanized Infantry Battalion
- 1st Cavalry Squadron
- 3rd Cavalry Squadron
