= History of the Philippine Army =

The history of the Philippine Army began in during pre-colonial era as different tribes established their own citizen force to defend the Balangays from intruders. Army was organized forces through the years who fought Spanish oppression and even other invaders such as Dutch and British who attempted to conquer the Philippines in early centuries.

== Battle before Colonization ==
The beginnings of the Filipino land forces dates back before the Spanish and American colonial period. In that time, clans and barangays from different regions form their own armed groups primarily composed of hunters and land fighters. They served as defenders of the tribes or as warriors sent on strike missions against other barangays. On occasions, some clan forces would form alliances to attack more powerful opponents. Conventional weaponry during the pre‐colonial era includes Kris and Kampilan, Blowguns, and Lantaka. War-fare instruments of the Filipino forces continued to develop over time.

== Spanish era ==
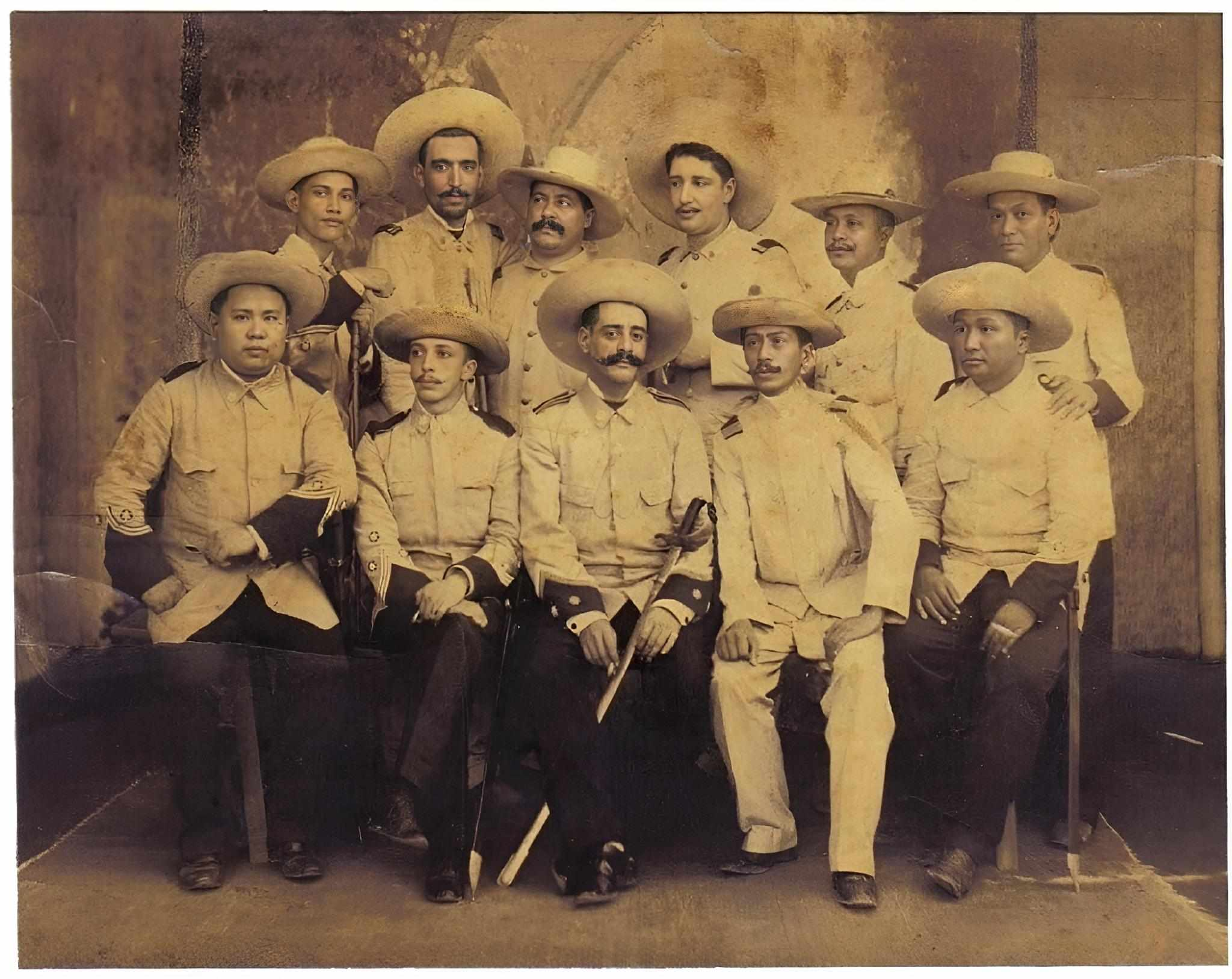
Manila Loyalist Volunteer Battalion consisting of Peninsulares, Filipino Insulares and Filipino native volunteers.

Spanish annexation and pacification of the Philippine islands was made possible with the recruitment of the native ally that helped the limited numbers of Spanish soldiers in the late 16th century. The conquest of Manila example, would not have been possible without the helped of the Visayan natives who sees the Rajah Sulayman of Maynila as an enemy. Most colonial soldiers throughout the islands are natives, outnumbering non-native soldiers. Most of the non native soldiers in the Philippines during the early part of colonization are Criollos, Mestizos and Natives of New Spain.

== Philippine Revolution ==
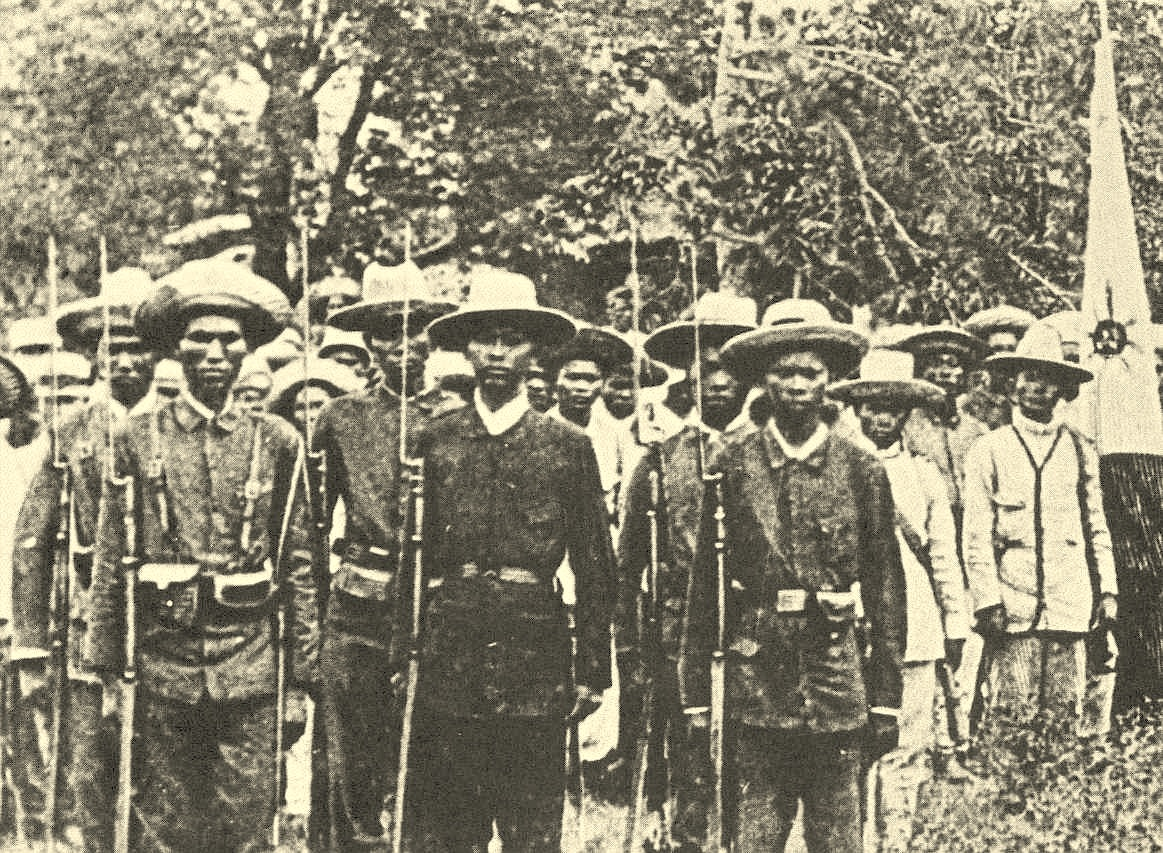
Philippine revolution soldiers

The first organized Army was the secret society that lead to revolution against Spain. It was led by Andres Bonifacio that fought during the first phase of the revolution. The society was called Katipunan or officially known as Katastaasang Kagalanggalangang Katipunan ng mga Anak ng Bayan. The movement reached to 20,000 from Luzon and Visayas Islands, upon its discovery Bonifacio gathered all his members and organized an army armed with Bolo, Lancers, Archers, and amulets. Few pistols and rifles was gathered but it was not enough to face the Spanish Army and Guardia Civil, in the early engagements it resulted to massacre as Katipuneros resorted to frontal attacked at the muzzle of rifles, cannons, and bayonets. However, Katipuneros from other provinces was successful due to better tactics and strategy especially in Nueva Ecija under General Mariano Llanera and Cavite under General Mariano Alvarez and General Emilio Aguinaldo. In 1997 in the Tejeros convention General Artemio Ricarte an Ilocano teacher was elected as Captain General that will lead the Revolutionary Army. One of the first action he did was to put all units in one command under the Revolutionary Government under General Emilio Aguinaldo.

== Independence from Spanish and Fil-American War ==
On June 12, 1898, Philippines gained its Independence after 333 years under the Spanish rule. With the help of United States Navy under Commodore George Dewey, Spanish Fleet was defeated in the battle of Manila Bay. Revolutionary Army surrounded Walled City of Manila in Intramuros but Americans had a secret arrangement of purchasing Philippines from Spain. President Emilio Aguinaldo appointed General Antonio Luna as Chief of Operations for Republican Army. The Army this time is under the Department of War under Secretary Baldomero Aguinaldo. General Luna established Academia Militar in Malolos, Bulacan to train officers in Military Tactics and Strategies. However, this was short lived due to the outbreak of the Filipino-American War. General Luna gave the Americans a hardtime in his delaying tactics, however his plan was not put into use after his death and all forces started to crumble until President Aguinaldo was captured in Palanan, Isabela.

== Insular Government ==
The Philippines was governed by a US insular government from 1901 to 1945; there was no standing Philippine Army during this period. The Philippine Scouts, Filipinos formerly working under the US Army, remained an active organization until they were disbanded in December 1948. The insular government organized the Philippine Constabulary to help quell criminalities and help put down insurrections such those of Moros in Sulu, Lanao, and Cotabato. This includes also the Sakdalistas and Asedillo in Laguna. The Constabulary was eventually disestablished in the 1990s.

The only time a large number of men organized as an Army unit was during World War I, Americans organized the Philippine National Guard. However, that was disbanded in 1919 as the war ended. The Constabulary and Philippine Scouts maintained the security and peace in the Philippine Archipelago in the period following World War I.

== Commonwealth of the Philippines ==
President-elect Manuel L. Quezon convinced his friend, General Douglas MacArthur (Chief of Staff of the U.S. Army), to organize a national army with Franklin D. Roosevelt's agreement in the summer of 1935. MacArthur had unusually-broad authority to deal with the Secretary of War and the Chief of Staff as military adviser to the commonwealth government to organize a Philippine national army.

MacArthur had broad authority to deal with the United States Secretary of War, his successor as the Army Chief of Staff, and the United States Army Philippine Department and its commander Major General Lucius R. Holbrook (who had been told that his most important peacetime mission was to assist MacArthur in forming a Philippine force capable of defending the islands). MacArthur selected Majors Dwight D. Eisenhower and James B. Ord as his assistants; they and a committee at the Army War College prepared plans for the defense of the Philippine Commonwealth, with a target of independence in 1946. The plan called for a small regular army with divisions of about 7,500 men, conscription of all men between twenty-one and fifty years of age and a ten-year training program to build a reserve army, a small air force and a fleet of torpedo boats capable of repelling an enemy.

The National Assembly of the Philippines' first act was the passage of the National Defense Act on December 21, 1935, with initial plans for a 10,000-man regular force based on the incorporation of the Philippine Constabulary, a 400,000-man reserve force by 1946.

=== Philippine Military Academy ===
To train new corps of officers a West-Point-type military academy was agreed to be established, the Philippine Constabulary Academy in Baguio on Luzon was in transition to be a formidable military academy. Lieutenant Colonel Amado Martelino a Philippine Scout was appointed as its Superintendent. The first graduate for the 4-year course was in 1939 and followed by 1940 and 1941 before the war begun.

When the war with Japan began, the Philippine Army was six years from its founding in December 1935 and about five years from the 1946 date at which it was to be fully operational. The naval force which was to protect it against a first-rate naval power was in ruins at Pearl Harbor; the Japanese had pilots standing by fueled-and-loaded bombers in Formosa, prepared to strike the Philippines.

=== Initial establishment and training ===
The Army of the Philippines was initially organized under the National Defense Act of 1935 (Commonwealth Act No. 1), of December 21, 1935. The Act specified that presidential appointments to grades above third lieutenant should be made from former holders of reserve commissions in the United States Army and former Philippine Scouts and Constabulary officers.

After the establishment of the commonwealth, Manuel L. Quezon, its first president, sought the services of General Douglas MacArthur to evolve a national-defense plan. On December 21, 1935, the Army of the Philippines was established. The act set forth the organizational structure of the army and enlistment and mobilization procedures.

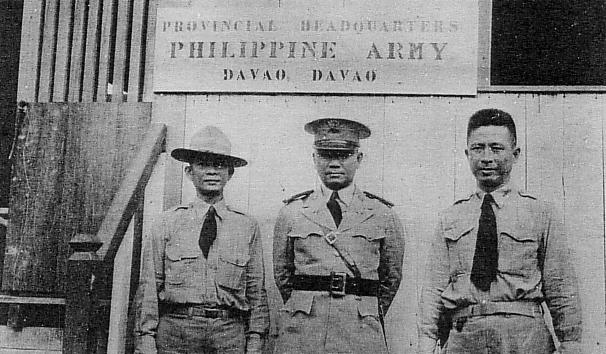
Philippine Army personnel in Davao

The army's development was slow. In 1936 a general headquarters and camps were built, cadres were organized and instructors, drawn largely from the Philippine Constabulary, were trained. The commander of the Philippine Department provided Philippine Scouts as instructors and detailed U.S. Army officers to assist in the inspection, instruction and administration of the program. By the end of the year, instructors were trained and camps (including general headquarters) established.

The first group of 20,000 to 40,000 men was called up on January 1, 1937, and by the end of 1939 there were 4,800 officers and 104,000 men in the reserves. Infantry training was provided at camps throughout the Philippines; field-artillery training was concentrated near the U.S. Army's Fort Stotsenburg (near Angeles in the province of Pampanga, about fifty miles north of Manila) and specialized training was provided at Fort William McKinley, south of Manila. Coast artillery instruction was carried out at Fort Stotsenburg and Grande Island, in Subic Bay, by personnel supplied largely by the American commander at Corregidor.

=== Mobilization, July 1941 ===
With the threat of war with the Empire of Japan imminent, on July 26, 1941, a new U.S. command in the Far East, the United States Army Forces Far East (USAFFE), was created under Douglas MacArthur (who also became a Philippine Field Marshal). That day, Franklin D. Roosevelt issued a presidential order (6 Fed. Reg. 3825) calling "all the organized military forces of the Government of the Commonwealth of the Philippines" into the service of the U.S. armed forces. Despite the order's wording, it did not order all the military forces of the Philippine Commonwealth government into the service of the United States; only those units and personnel indicated in orders issued by a general officer of the United States Army were mobilized and made an integral part of the USAFFE, and only those members of a unit who physically reported for duty were inducted. With an annual appropriation of almost ₱16 million, the mobilized units trained new Filipino members in defense.

The Philippine Army was drawn from local Christian and Muslim Filipinos, including native Filipinos, Filipino-Mestizos, Spanish-Filipinos, Chinese-Filipinos and Moro-Filipinos. By the time of the Japanese invasion the 10 reserve divisions were about two-thirds mobilized, for a force of 100,000 "poorly equipped and trained" troops. The Philippine Scouts numbered about 12,000. The army was primarily infantry, with some combat engineers and artillery.

At that time there were two regular and ten reserve divisions in the Army of the Philippines, spread across officers in general headquarters, camps in Manila and across the country. This included the North Luzon Force under Major General Jonathan M. Wainwright; the South Luzon Force, activated on December 13, 1941, under Brig. Gen. George M. Parker; the Visayan-Mindanao Force under Maj. Gen. William F. Sharp in the southern islands (61st, 81st, and 101st Infantry Divisions and three other infantry regiments), and the reserve force. The North Luzon Force included the 11th, 21st, and 31st reserve infantry divisions. The South Luzon Force included the 1st (regular) Division and the reserve 41st, 51st and 71st Divisions.

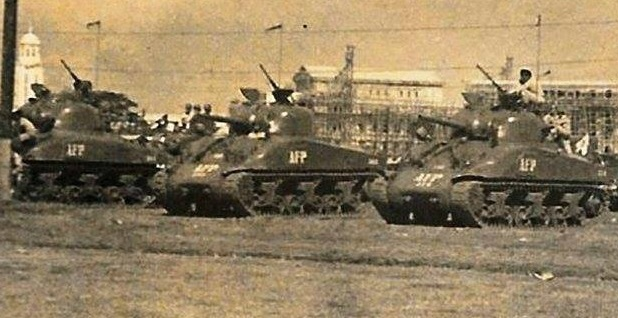
Philippine Army M4 Shermans shortly after the country became independent

After the war ended, the Army was reorganized into the Armed Forces of the Philippines. President Manuel Roxas appointed General Mariano Castañeda Sr as Chief of Staff. The Armed Forces is now composed of Philippine Army, Navy, Air Force, and Constabulary. Army and Armed Forces still shared headquarters and personnel. In post-war Philippine Army relegated to fighting dissidents.

== Korean War ==
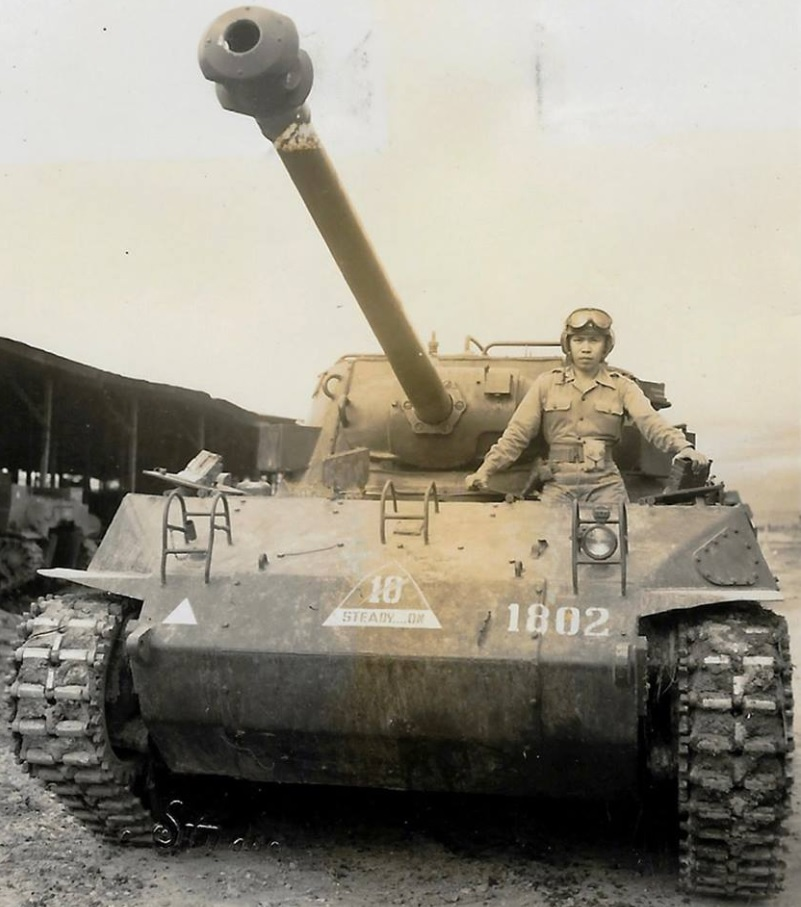
Philippine Army M18 Hellcat of the 10th Infantry Battalion during the 1950s

1950 would see the new army not just fighting Communist groups in Luzon but from August of that year, even the Korean People's Army and their allies in the People's Liberation Army in the Korean War as PA Battalion Combat Teams (BCTs) forming the bulk of the Philippine Expeditionary Forces to Korea formed part of the UN forces, led by the US, that fought in the conflict. The Philippines sent 4 Battalion Combat Teams over the duration of the war, totaling 7,600 soldiers were sent to fight for UN Forces. The Battle of Yultong was the proudest moment for the PEFTOK after repulsing Chinese Army from overwhelming the Filipinos. However, 2 officers were killed in this engagement Captain Condrado Yap and 1Lieutenant Jose Artiaga. Also, the Battle of Hill Erie was known to the western due to the successful assault of the Filipino soldiers led by young then First Lieutenant Fidel V. Ramos who will be the future President of the Philippines.

== Separation of Army Headquarters ==
In 1957, General Leoncio Tan established an Army Headquarters from Armed Forces Headquarters. This marked the new era of Philippine Army. The decade saw the raising of the first active division of the Army, the 1st Infantry Division. With the victory over the Huks later in the 50s, the BCTs became active duty infantry battalions. Formed in the same time was the 1st Scout Ranger Regiment initiated by then Captain Rafael Ileto, who was ordered by Army Commanding General Alfonso Arellano, and in 1962 the PA raised its airborne and special forces formation, the Special Forces Regiment (Philippines) with its founder then Captain Fidel V. Ramos, PA following the traditions of the US Army Special Forces (the Green Berets) and the 11th Airborne Division that helped liberate Southern Luzon and Manila at the closing stages of the Japanese occupation of the country.

=== Campaign against Hukbalahap ===
In 1945 until 1955 Luis Taruc led the belligerent against the Government. The Philippine Army organized Battalion Combat Teams to combat the expansion of this movement. With Secretary of National Defense and later President Ramon Magsaysay program that helped the Army subdue the huks and its top leaders neutralized in Tarlac, Albay, and Panay.

== Vietnam War ==
Some Filipino medics went to South Vietnam for humanitarian aid in the Vietnam War, with the approval of Magsaysay in 1954. Their efforts were known as Operation Brotherhood, which received international support in order to help the operation's goals to aid the Vietnamese refugees.

In July 1964, South Vietnam asked the Philippines for assistance against its belligerents in the North when Major General Nguyễn Khánh sent a note to President Diosdado Macapagal asking for aid in the Vietnam War. In August 1964, the first Philippine contingent (PHILCON I) was sent to South Vietnam in 1965 after Macapagal secured the consent of the Congress. The contingent initially consisted of 16 individuals who were doctors, nurses, technicians, and civic action officers (some are from the Philippine Army). Aside from humanitarian aid, the contingent was also involved in psychological warfare according to the official records of the United States' Military Assistance Command, Vietnam.

The United States was partially successful in convincing Marcos to retract his stance after five diplomatic missions. While he was remained firm in not sending combat troops in South Vietnam, he opened to the possibility of sending more troops to provide humanitarian aid. The plan to send a second contingent to South Vietnam was approved by the Congress on July 14, 1966, under Republic Act No. 4664. Under Marcos he did not allow the United States to fully fund the formation of the contingent since he believed the Filipinos would be treated as mercenaries by the Americans if they did so. The South Vietnam government accepted the Philippines offer of a second contingent on August 15, 1966, while PHILCAG commander, General Gaudencio V. Tobias receiving order from Marcos to secretly establish contact with the Viet Cong so that the Philippines could act as an intermediary for a peace negotiation since there is a belief in the country that North Vietnam would not be hostile to idea due to PHILCAG's non-combat role in the war.

The Philippines hosted the Manila Summit of the Southeast Asia Treaty Organization in October 1966, where seven members promised aid to South Vietnam against the communist North. There was some opposition regarding the deployment of the Philippine Civic Action Group to South Vietnam by academics, students, and laborers who held protests during the summit. The Vietnam Aid Bill in the Philippine Congress was also opposed by a significant minority.

The Philippine Civic Action Group while primarily involved in rebuilding roads and providing humanitarian aid were occasionally involved in defensive operations. It was involved in Operation Attleboro where 4 of its personnel were wounded. By the end of the 1966, the Philippines had 2,063 personnel in South Vietnam.

In 1969, the Philippines began withdrawing its contingent and by the 1973, the recall was completed. From 1964 to 1973, nine Filipino personnel were killed in action as well as four others due to other causes.

== Martial Law ==
On September 21, 1972, President Ferdinand Marcos, declared Martial Law to the entire Philippines. Armed Forces of the Philippines was given the tasked to put order in the country. The widespread of NPA activities in the countryside and anarchy made by nationwide protests, Army together with Philippine Constabulary was deputized to implement the law and most positions in the government was filled by Army officers.

== Fight against Communism ==
=== New People's Army ===
In 1969 Kumander Dante, a former Hukbalahap cadre became the face of the New People's Army (NPA). With the backing of Communist Party of the Philippines (CPP) under Jose Ma. Sison, this also lead the way for other communist group National Democratic Front (NDF), Urban based group Alex Boncayao Brigade (ABB), and breakaway Cordillera Army under Fr. Condrado Balweg. NPA's Sparrow Unit

== Fight Against Moro Secession ==
=== MNLF ===
Moro secession movements Moro National Liberation Front under former UP Professor Nur Misuari started to attacked Philippine Government establishments and resulted in the Battle of Jolo in 1974. The massacre of 31st Infantry Battalion in Pata Island in Sulu known now as Pata Island Massacre in 1981, and the treacherous killing of General Teodulfo Bautista in Patikul, Sulu in 1977 known as Patikul Massacre. The group entered into peace accord by the government with the helped of Libyan government in 1976. The gun battle has stopped and lessened but in 2012, a MNLF faction under Kumander Ustadz Habier Malik laid sieged in Zamboanga City to imposed their demands to the government.

=== MILF ===
In 1979 another Moro secession movement was born in the mainland Mindanao. Moro Islamic Liberation Front (MILF) under Hashim Salamat a former MNLF Central Committee member. The Army is now fighting in different fronts. In 2000 President Joseph Estrada, declared an all out war with them capturing all their major camps and its main camp (Camp Abubakar) in Matanog, Maguindanao.

=== BIFF ===
In 2014, a breakaway MILF Kumander Umbra Kato who was against MILF securing peace with the Philippine Government. He formed another group called Bangsamoro Islamic and started attacking government forces in 2015. The botched

== Fight Against Terrorism ==
=== Abu Sayyaf Group ===
During the early 1990s, the Muslim extremist group Abu Sayyaf emerged under Abdurajak Janjalani, an Afghanistan War veteran. This group relied on kidnappings, killings among the Christian community, bombings, and raids. The raid on Ipil town in 1995 was the most brazen attack of the group, with its members massacring a large group of the towns civilians and policemen. Kidnappings in Sipadan (2000), Dos Palmas (2001), and Pearl Farm (2015) was highly published but other kidnappings of teachers, students, Priests in different areas of Basilan. A ranger company under then Captain Ruben Guinolbay attacked Lamitan Hospital and Church were Abu Sabaya and Janjalani hauled up the Dos Palmas kidnap victims now known as Lamitan Siege. It took a year before Army Rangers led by Captain Olier Almonares were able to rescue Gracia Gracia but her husband Martin was killed.

=== Maute Group ===
An ISIS inspired group emerged in Butig, Lanao Del Sur in 1915 and started to fight the government to established Islamic State in the Philippines. After 2 years of sporadic fighting with Philippine Army. They collaborated with Abu Sayyaf to siege Marawi City, Lanao Del Sur in 2017 to established Islamic State, this culminated during Marawi Siege where they killed Christians and Policemen in the city. A combined Army, Marines, Air Force, and Navy operations for 5 months to defeat the terrorists that culminated the death of the top leaders Abdullah Maute, Omar Maute and Isnilon Hapilon.

=== Daulah Islamiah ===
Another small militant group that resorting to extortion, kidnappings, and bombings.

=== Jemaah Islamiah ===
Another small militant group that resorting to extortion, kidnappings, and bombings mostly operating in southern Mindanao.

== 21st Century ==
Modernization has been on the Philippine Army's plan since 1990s, making to modernize the . However, Asian Final Crisis hit the country in 1998 and early 2000. It did not materialized until late on the next decade. The Revised Modernization Act was implemented in 2018 but Army modernization has hit some delays due to funds not allocated by Congress. Due to South China Sea Issue, the AFP started its rollout on 2016 with new firearms and weaponries.

President Bongbong Marcos approved the new military procurement 'wish list' of the Army and now funds allocated for new weaponry, communications equipment, and new artillery.

== Personnel Strength ==
1896 - 1901 Revolutionary Army - 70,000

1901 - 1910

1911 - 1915

1915 - 1920

1921 - 1930

1930 - 1934

1935 - 1942: Philippine Commonwealth Army - 103,000

1942 - 1945: Guerilla Forces - 35,000

1946 - 1950: 35,000

1950 - 1960: 55,000

1960 - 1970: 65,000

1980 - 1989: 135,000

1990 - 2000: 90,000

2000 - 2010: 96,000

2010 - 2020: 100,000

2020–Present: 105,000

== See also ==
- Armed Forces of the Philippines
- Military History of the Philippines
- Philippine Army
- Philippine Revolutionary Army
- Luna sharpshooters
- List of Equipment Uniforms of the Philippine Commonwealth Army
