= Allan C. McBride =

United States Army general

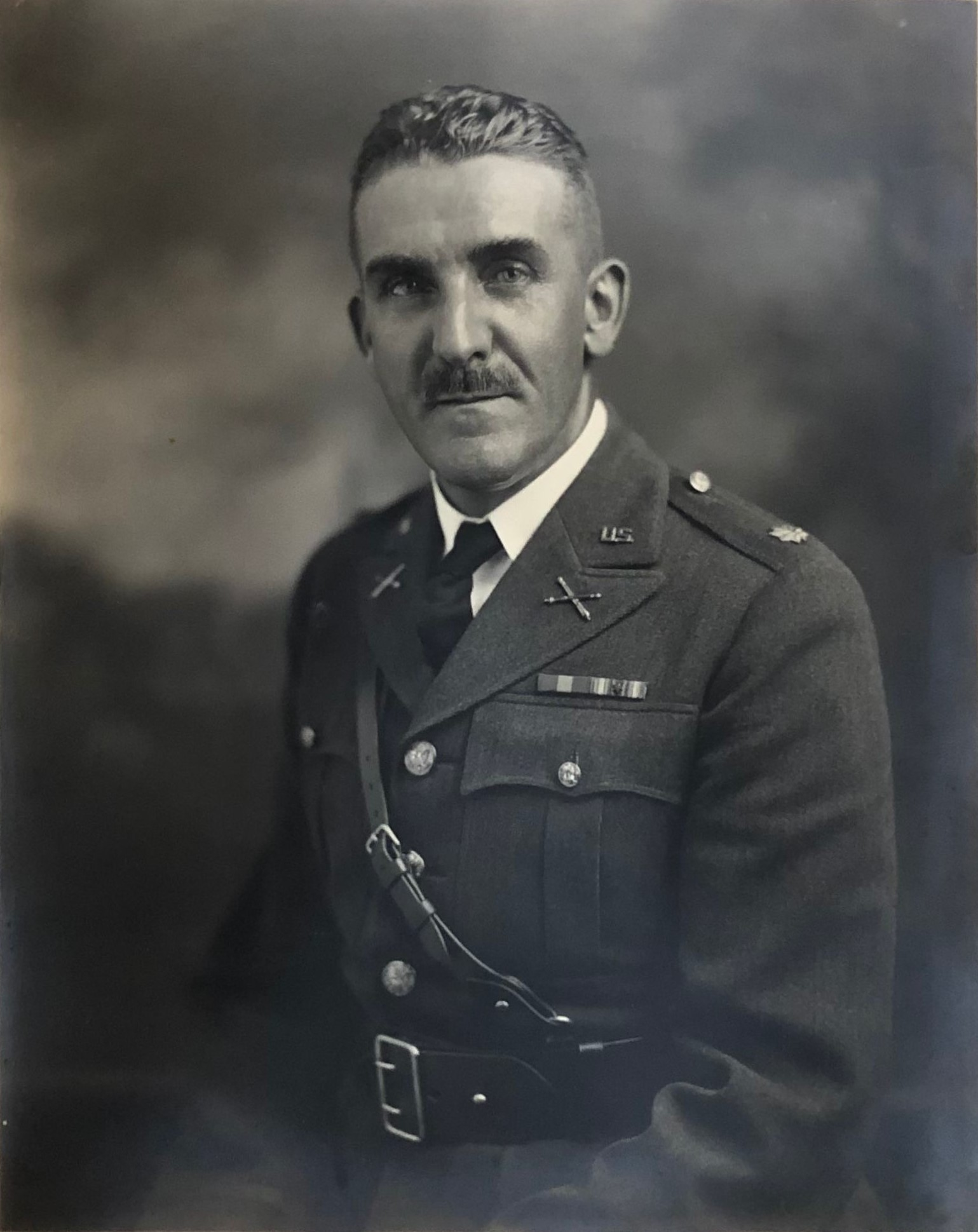
- Born: June 30, 1885; Frederick, Maryland
- Died: May 9, 1944 (aged 58); Shirakawa Prison Camp, Formosa
- Burial place: Mount Olivet Cemetery (Frederick)
- Military career
- Allegiance: United States of America
- Branch: United States Army
- Service years: 1908–1944
- Rank: Brigadier General
- Nickname: Mac
- Service number: 0–2461
- Units: Service Area Command, Luzon Force; US Philippine Department
- Conflicts: World War I World War II ● Battle of Bataan
- Awards: Distinguished Service Medal; Silver Star; Soldier's Medal

Allan Clay McBride (June 30, 1885 – May 9, 1944) was an American brigadier general and chief of staff in the Philippines at the time of the Japanese invasion. He died of starvation in a Japanese prisoner-of-war camp on Formosa.

In 1908, McBride earned an A.B. degree from St. John's Military College in Annapolis, Maryland. He was commissioned as a second lieutenant of field artillery in September 1908. During World War I, McBride served as a battalion commander in France and received a temporary promotion to lieutenant colonel.

After the war, McBride graduated from the Command and General Staff School in 1923 and the Army War College in 1926. He was promoted to lieutenant colonel in January 1933 and colonel in September 1937.

Sent to the Philippines in February 1941, McBride received a temporary promotion to brigadier general in December 1941 as deputy commander of US Philippine Department. He was put in command of Service Area Command during the Battle of Bataan with his headquarters in Mariveles at the southern tip most of Bataan facing Corregidor Island. He was captured by Japanese forces when General Edward P. King surrendered entire Luzon Force in Bataan on April 9, 1942. He was awarded the Distinguished Service Medal in November 1942. McBride died after over two years as a prisoner of war. He was posthumously awarded the Silver Star for his bravery during harsh interrogation after capture.

After the war, his remains were exhumed from Taiwan in 1947, transferred to Hawaii and then reburied at Mount Olivet Cemetery in Frederick, Maryland on May 25, 1948.
