= 41st Division (Philippines) =

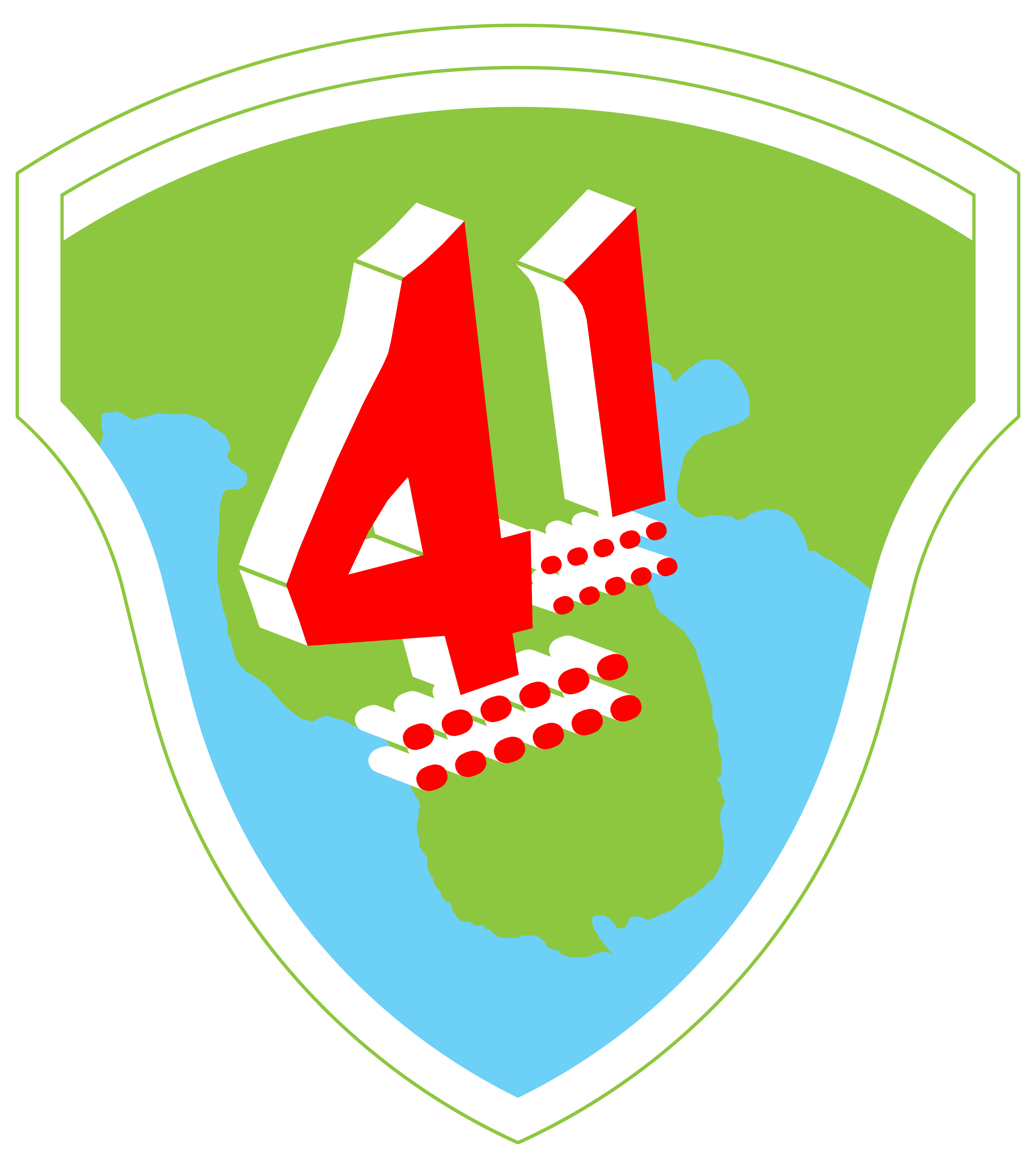
- 41st Philippine Division Emblem 1941-42
- Active: 28 August 1941 - 9 April 1942
- Disbanded: April 9, 1941
- Countries: United States of America; Philippines
- Allegiance: United States Army; Philippine Commonwealth Army
- Branch: Army
- Type: Infantry Division
- Role: Division
- Size: 8200
- Part of: South Luzon Force(II Philippine Corps)
- Cantonment: Tagaytay, Cavite
- Anniversaries: August 28
- Equipment: M1903 Springfield Rifles; M1917 Enfield Rifles; M1923 Thompson Submachineguns; M1918 Browning Automatic Rifles; M1917 Browning Machineguns; M2 Browning Heavy Machineguns; M1916 75mm Guns; QF 2.95inch Mountain Guns; 3inch Stokes Mortars
- Engagements: World War II: Battle of Bataan; Philippines campaign (1941–1942)
- Decorations: Philippine Presidential Unit Citation; Philippine Defense Campaign Medal

Commanders
- Commander: BGen. Vicente P. Lim
- Senior Instructor: Col. Malcolm V. Fortier, USA
- Chief of Staff: LCol. Tomas Domaoal, PA
- Notable commanders: Brigadier General Vicente Lim Lieutenant Colonel Silvino Gallardo; Lieutenant Colonel Claro Lizardo Major Rigoberto Atienza

Insignia
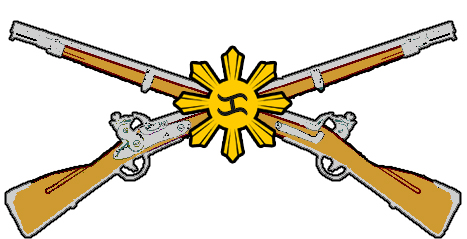
- Identification symbol

The 41st Infantry Division was a division of the Philippine Army under the United States Army Forces in the Far East (USAFFE).

== Organization ==
The division had an authorized strength of 7,500 men. As of March 1942, the division had fewer than 6,000 men. The 41st Field Artillery Regiment had sixteen 75-mm. guns and eight 2.95-inch pack howitzers.

== History ==
It was active from August 28, 1941 to April 9, 1942, whereupon it surrendered when Bataan fell. Previously it was active in the City of Manila, Southern Luzon. BGen. Vicente P. Lim (PA) (USMA, 1914) was the division's commander, and Col. Malcolm V. Fortier was the division's Senior Instructor, desperately trying to get the new recruits of the division (nearly the entire cadre) up to par in a record amount of time.

By 4 November 1941, the 41st was put under the South Luzon Force (SLF) under the command of BGen. George M. Parker, along with the 51st Division and the Battery A of 86th FA of the Philippine Scouts.

=== The first days ===
After the Japanese invasion of the Philippines in December 1941, it formed part of South Luzon Force (activated December 13, 1941) under BGen. George M. Parker Jr. The South Luzon Force controlled a zone east and south of Manila. Parker had the Philippine Army's 41st and 51st Infantry Divisions and the 2nd Provisional Artillery Group of two batteries of the U.S. 86th Field Artillery Regiment (Philippine Scouts).

When the Japanese began landing at Lamon Bay on December 24, 1941, South Luzon Force was badly dispersed. The 41st Division (PA) on the west coast was in position, but elements of the 51st Division along the east coast were in the process of movement. Meanwhile, upon activation of War Plan Orange-3, the Southern Luzon Force was called to Bataan. BGen. Parker sent his division staff to relay to BGen. Lim, and movement only commenced when 41st Division staff officers were able to commandeer buses of the Pasay Transportation Company.

=== Bataan ===
The 41st Division was one of the first units to reach Bataan, and rallied around Abucay from December 23–25, 1941. The division was in position along the Mt. Natib trail and Balantay River and defended the center of the Abucay Line, against Japanese assaults until ordered to retreat on 22 January.

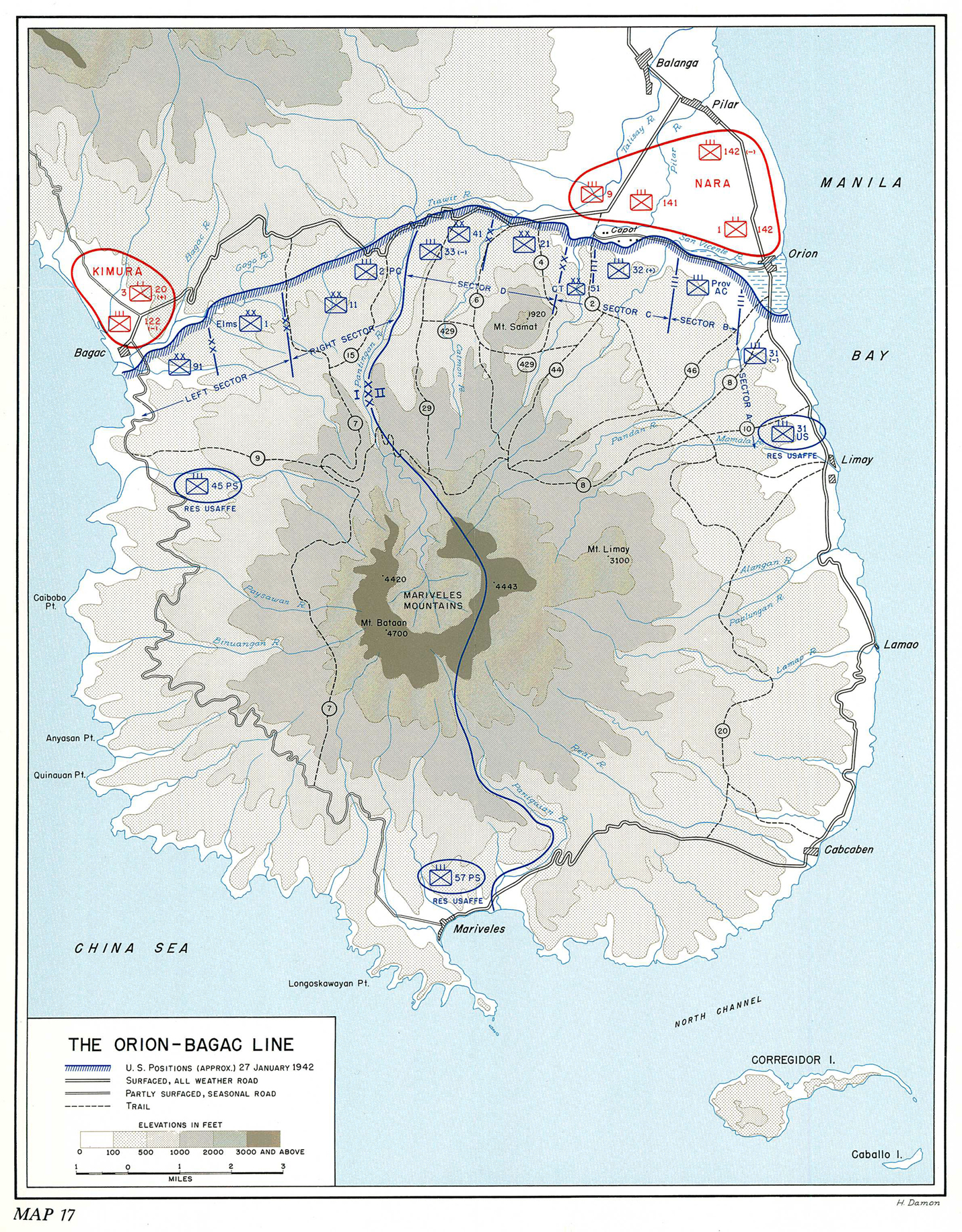
The Orion–Bagac line showing the U.S. positions around 27 January 1942

The 41st Division was then ordered to hold east of Pantingan River in Pilar, Bataan and west of Mount Samat, along the Orion-Bagac Line, making them as the key unit to hold any southern movement of the Japanese forces through Trail 29. The 41st Division gave the stiffest opposition to the Japanese offensive, punishing elements of the opposing Japanese 65th Brigade's 141st Battalion. BGen. Lim at some point directed small and effective counter-offensives, only to be directed to return to the Bagac-Orion Line. The 141st Battalion by April 9 recorded that they have lost 70% of their manpower facing the 41st Division units. In exacting revenge after the Fall of Bataan, the 65th Brigade mistook the men of the 91st Division for the 41st Division, and had them summarily executed to now what is known as the Pantingan River massacre.

The division held the extreme left of the II Corps line on the eve of the last Japanese offensive in Bataan on April 3, along with the 31st Division. Such was the effect of bombardment that even before the Japanese tank-infantry attack had begun to roll, the 41st Division had ceased to exist as an effective military organization. The units most affected by the bombardment and the assault were the 42d and 43d Infantry. The first, in the center of the division front where bamboo fires burned fiercely, had retreated in a disorderly fashion, some of the men following Trail 29 into the 41st Infantry area, and others drifting eastward to join the retreating 43d on the western slopes of Mt. Samat. Only the 41st Infantry on the extreme left of the line, which had escaped the full weight of the preliminary bombardment, had withdrawn in an orderly fashion.

Despite the attempt to stem the Japanese advance, by 4 April the division was routed. On 9 April, the inevitable bitter end came. MGen. Edward P. King Jr., commander of Bataan Defense Force, surrendered to prevent the unnecessary slaughter of his war-torn troops, negotiating the surrender of the Bataan troops with the Japanese High Command.

The Japanese was so rapid that BGen. Vicente Lim and his division staff was captured before even MGen. Edward King's capitulation of Bataan. The division initially began marching from Pilar, Bataan on what would later be known as the infamous Bataan Death March all the way to San Fernando, Pampanga. They covered about 65 km under intense conditions of heat and brutality from the guards. Upon arrival in San Fernando 6,000 of them were herded in the city's cock pit arena. The following day, the POWs from the 41st Division were packed 80-100 in railway boxcars and transported from San Fernando to Sto. Domingo Station at Capas, Tarlac. From there, the POWs marched the remaining distance of 7 km to Camp O'Donnell to be incarcerated with 65,000 other Filipino and American POWs for the next 4 months under deplorable conditions, leading to 400 deaths per day.

== Memorial ==
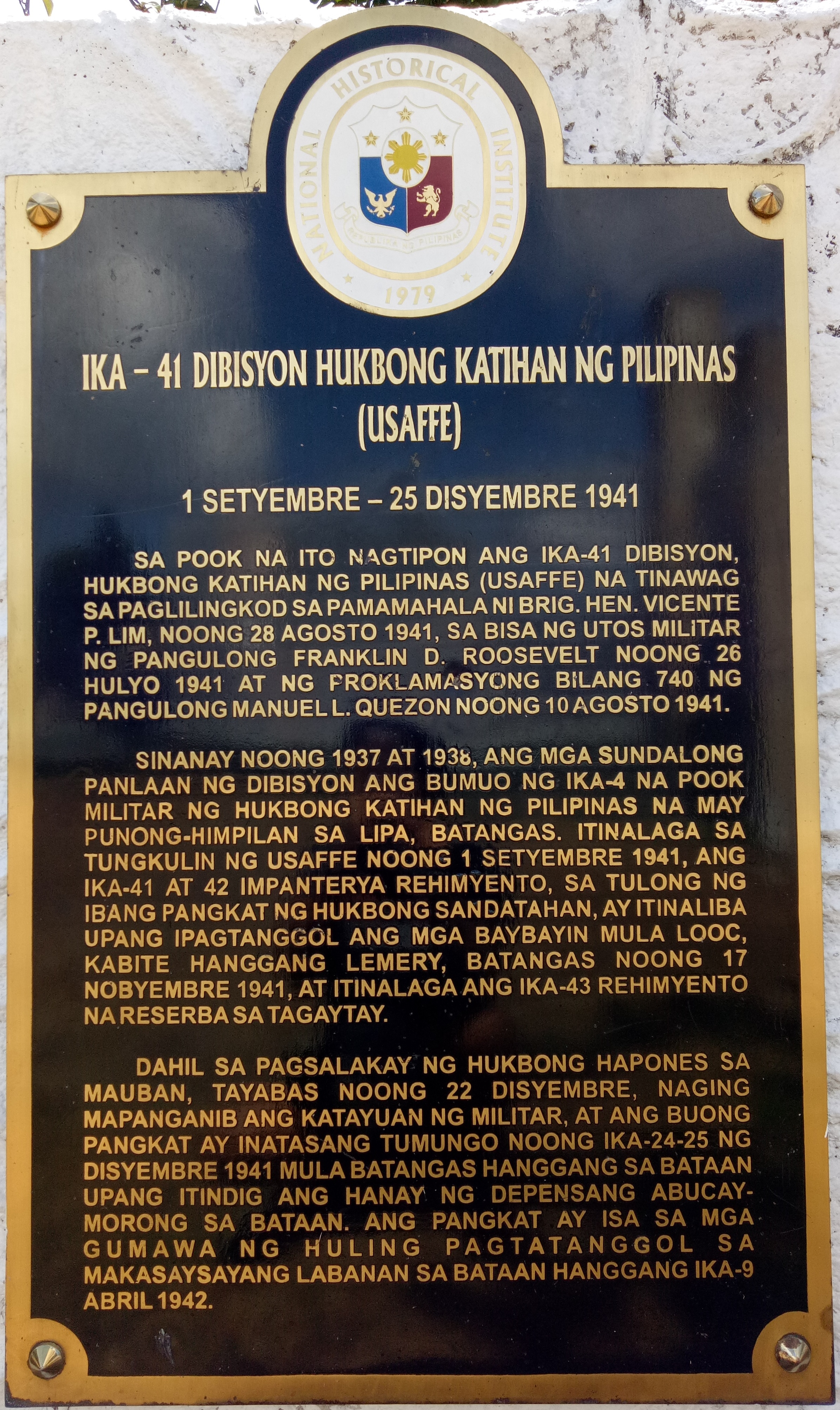
41st Division Philippine Army USAFFE historical marker

There are a couple of memorials and markers honoring the BGen. Vicente Lim and the 41st Division:

- 41st Division PA USAFFE Shrine in Tagaytay near the Tagaytay Convention Center. The epitaphs have all the names of the 41st Division veterans, KIA, and MIA.
- Capas National Shrine which was the former location of the POW Camp in Camp O'Donnell
- 41st Division Marker at the Pacific War Memorial on Corregidor Island
- 41st Division Marker at the WW2 Memorial at the Libingan ng mga Bayani in Fort Bonifacio, Taguig City.
- 41st Division Marker at the Mount Samat National Shrine.
- 41st Division Marker near the Pantingan River Bridge.

== Order of battle ==
- 41st Infantry Regiment (PA) - LCol. Silvino Gallardo | LCol. Fidel Cruz | LCol Loren Wetherby
  - 1st Battalion - Major Jacobo Zobel | Major Robert Baker
  - 2nd Battalion - Major David Puro
  - 3rd Battalion - Capt. Harold Anderson
- 42nd Infantry Regiment (PA) - LCol. Claro B. Lizardo | LCol. Norbert Timmerman, USA
  - 1st Bn - Capt Razon | Capt Rodrigo
  - 2nd Bn - Capt Rillo
  - 3rd Bn - Capt Amado Magtoto
- 43rd Infantry Regiment (PA) - LCol. Emmanuel Baja | LCol. Valentin Salgado |LCol. Handford Lockwood Jr.
  - 1st Bn - Capt Salvador Piccio | Capt Cabigting
  - 2nd Bn - Capt Mendoza
  - 3rd Bn - Capt Dela Cruz
- 41st Field Artillery Regiment (PA) - LCol. Amado Martelino
  - Senior Instructor - LCol A.P Moore
  - Executive Officer - Maj Alfonso Arellano
  - 41st FA Regt HQ Company
  - 1st Bn/41st FA Regt (PA) (75mm guns, 16x)
  - 2nd Bn/41st FA Regt (PA) (2.95-inch pack howitzers, 4x)
  - 3rd Bn/41st FA Regt (PA)
- 41st Engineer Battalion (PA) - Capt Rigoberto Atienza | Capt Manuel Tinio | Capt Henry Harris
- 41st Division Units
  - 41st Division Headquarters & HQ Company
  - 41st Medical Battalion - Maj. Hospicio Solidum
  - 41st Signal Company
  - 41st Quartermaster Company (Motorized) - Captain Ernesto D. Rufino
  - 41st QM Transport Company (Truck)

== Notable members ==
- Jose Agdamag, was an officer and served throughout the Bataan Campaign. Became a sports shooter and participated in 1960 and 1968 Olympics.
- Vicente Lim, Prewar Philippine Commonwealth Army deputy Chief of Staff. Was executed when captured in 1944 in an attempt to rejoin General MacArthur.
- Alfonso Arellano, later AFP Chief of Staff
- Rigoberto Atienza, later AFP Chief of Staff
- Rafael Zagala, later Commanding General of Philippine Army.
- Dionisio Ojeda, will command 10th BCT and Manila Chief of Police

== Bibliography ==
- Morton, Louis (1953). The Fall of the Philippines (Publication 5-2). Archived from the original on 8 January 2012.
