= Fidel Segundo =

Filipino army general

Fidel V. Segundo
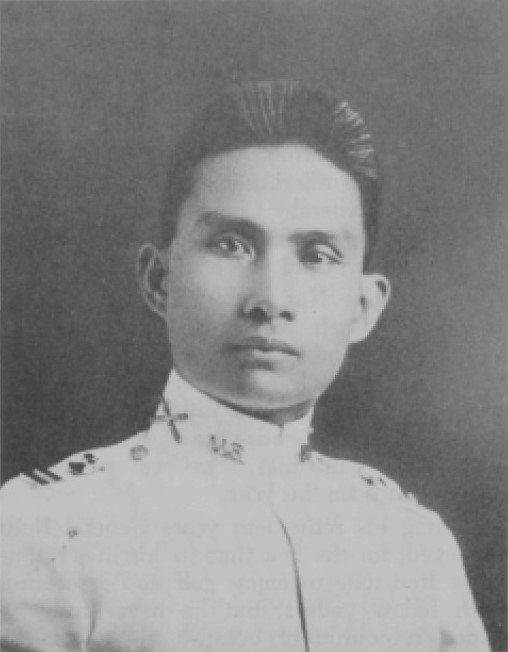
- Segundo as a captain in the Philippine Scouts
- Born: 24 April 1894; Laoag, Ilocos Norte, Captaincy General of the Philippines
- Died: 6 January 1945 (aged 50); Manila, Philippines
- Education: United States Military Academy (Class of August 1917)
- Spouse: Angela G. Agcaoili
- Children: Fidel Jr. (son); Maria Lourdes (daughter); Lucien (son); Roberto (son)
- Military career
- Allegiance: United States of America; Philippines
- Branch of Service: Philippine Army; U.S. Philippine Scouts
- Service years: 1917–1945
- Rank: Brigadier General (PA); Lieutenant Colonel (PS)
- Nickname: Smoke
- Units: 1st Infantry Division; 2nd Infantry Regiment
- Commands: Provost Marshal, I Philippine Corps 1st Regular Division (Philippines); Philippine Military Academy; 2nd Infantry Regiment (Philippines)
- Battles/Wars: World War I; World War II; Battle of Bataan
- Awards: Purple Heart

Fidel Ventura Segundo (24 April 1894 – 6 January 1945) was a Filipino brigadier general and World War II hero. He commanded the 1st Regular Division (Philippines) during the invasion by Japan and then survived the Bataan Death March. Paroled from prison, Segundo was later executed for aiding the Filipino resistance forces.

== Early life and education ==
Segundo was born in Laoag, Ilocos Norte, the son of Luciano Segundo and Paula Ventura. After completing primary school in Laoag, he attended Manila High School. Segundo then enrolled at the University of the Philippines as a pre-med student. Appointed to the United States Military Academy, he graduated in August 1917. Segundo attended the Air Service Observation School from September 1920 to January 1921. He later graduated from the Field Artillery School battery officers' course in August 1925 and the Cavalry School troop officers' course in June 1926.

Segundo married Angela G. Agcaoili in 1919. They had three sons and a daughter.

== Military career ==
Segundo was commissioned in the Philippine Scouts and briefly served as a temporary major during World War I. He commanded an artillery battery at Camp Stotsenburg from January 1919 to September 1920 and served as a battery commander with the 24th Field Artillery from September 1926 to May 1929. Segundo was promoted to captain in November 1926 and major in June 1936. He taught military science and tactics at the University of the Philippines from 1929 to 1936.

Appointed colonel in the newly created Philippine Army in 1936, Segundo led the establishment and training of its field artillery branch. Retaining his U.S. Army commission, he was promoted to lieutenant colonel in August 1940. Colonel Segundo assumed command of the 2nd Infantry Regiment (Philippines) in July 1940. He was subsequently appointed superintendent of the Philippine Military Academy in August 1941 and served in that post until directed to evacuate Baguio in December 1941.

Segundo was then promoted to brigadier general in the Philippine Army and assumed command of the 1st Regular Division on 19 December 1941. Despite limited training and armament, his division participated in the defense of southern Luzon and then fought at Bataan until the April 1942 surrender.

As a native Filipino, Segundo was imprisoned at the Capas Concentration Camp. Paroled to Manila, he became an advisor to the underground resistance to the Japanese occupation. Segundo and his son Fidel Jr. were arrested by the Japanese military police on 19 December 1944. After several weeks of harsh interrogation, he was executed in early January 1945 and buried in an unmarked common grave.

== Legacy ==
The segment of the Pan-Philippine Highway immediately north of his hometown of Laoag is named Gen. Fidel V. Segundo Avenue. In December 1969, a historical marker was erected in Laoag to commemorate him.
