= 51st Division (Philippines) =

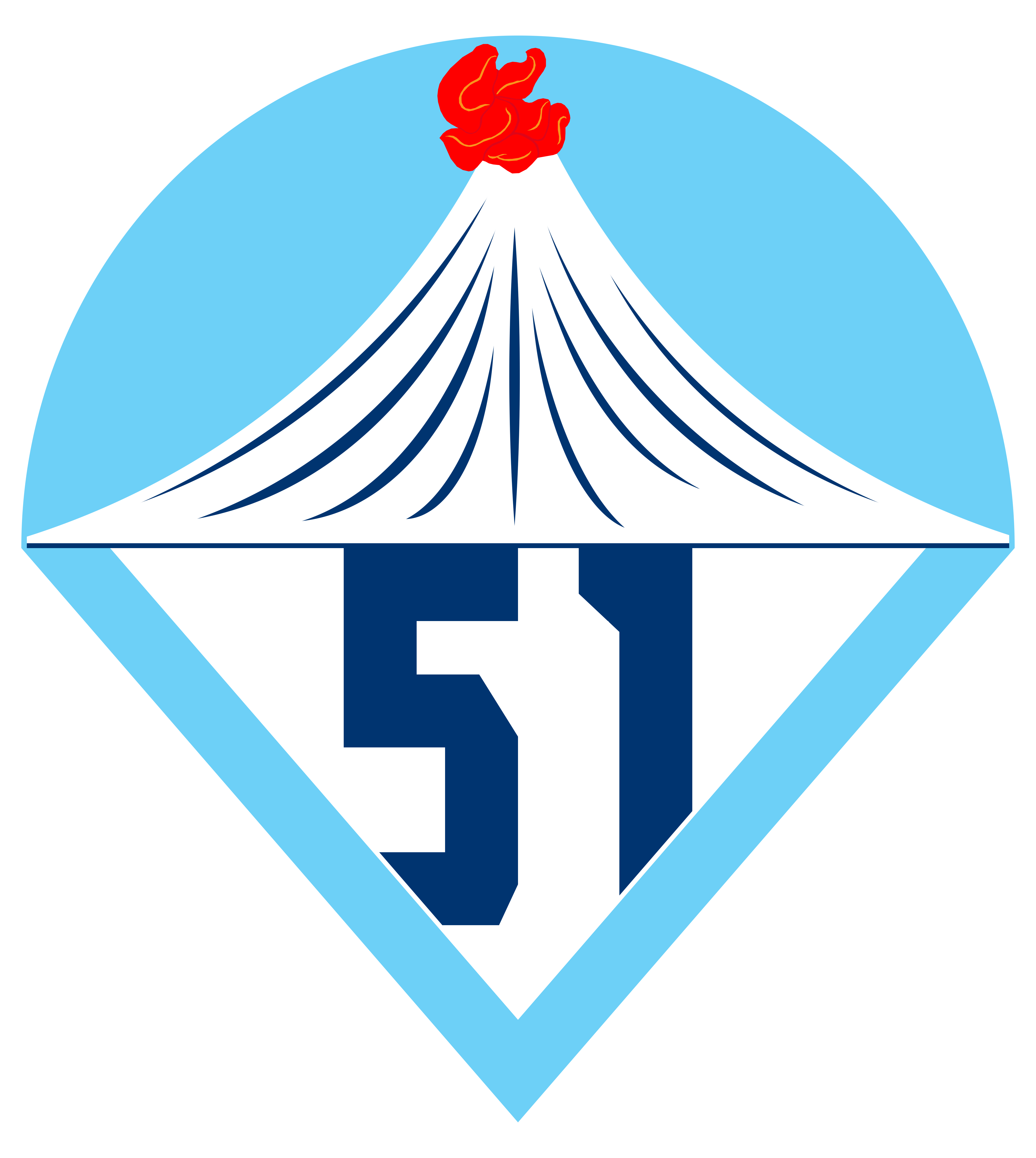
- 51st Philippine Division Emblem 1941-42
- Active: September 1941 - 9 April 1942
- Disbanded: April 9, 1942
- Country: Commonwealth of the Philippines
- Allegiance: United States Army; Philippine Commonwealth Army
- Branch: Philippine Army
- Type: Infantry Division
- Role: Infantry
- Size: 6000
- Part of: South Luzon Force (II Philippine Division)
- Cantonment: Tanauan, Batangas
- Engagements: World War II: Battle of Mauban; Battle of Bataan; Philippines campaign (1941–1942)

Commanders
- Commanders: (United States) Col.Adlai C. Young (United States) BGen. Albert M. Jones
- Chief of Staff: (Philippines) LCol. Ricardo Poblete, PA (United States) Col. Stuart C. MacDonald
- General Staff: G1 Maj Carreon G2 Capt A. Soriano; G3 LCol. E.E Adridge G4 Capt H.E White

The 51st Infantry Division was a division of the Philippine Army under the United States Army Forces in the Far East (USAFFE). It fought in Southern Luzon and in Bataan until it surrendered in April 9, 1941.

== Organization ==
The 51st Division was active from 1941 to April 9, 1942, whereupon it surrendered when Bataan fell. Previously it was active in the east of Southern Luzon and Bicol Peninsula. BGen. Albert M. Jones (USA) was the division's commander; the Chief of Staff was LCol. Ricardo Poblete, PA. Several Filipino officers became part of Division Staffs Captain Manuel T. Flores as Division Supply Officer G4. 1Lieutenant Jose C. Limpo as division motor transport officer in Bataan. General Parker temporarily moved to command South Luzon Force and later when General Jones took command of I Philippine Corps in Bataan. It posted its headquarters in Tanauan, Batangas in September 1941 until withdrawn to Bataan.

=== Combat Narrative ===
After the Japanese invasion of the Philippines in December 1941, it formed part of the South Luzon Force (activated December 13, 1941) under Brig. Gen. George M. Parker Jr. The South Luzon Force controlled a zone east and south of Manila. Parker had the PA 41st and 51st Infantry Divisions and the 2nd Provisional Artillery Group of two batteries of the U.S. 86th Field Artillery Regiment (Philippine Scouts).

When the Japanese began landing at Lamon Bay on December 24, 1941, South Luzon Force was badly dispersed. The 41st Division (PA) on the west coast was in position, but elements of the 51st Division along the east coast were in the process of movement.

General Jones was temporarily removed from the command to take over South Luzon Force as General Parker was ordered to Bataan to prepare for the withdrawal of all forces there. General Jones led entire South Luzon Force (SLF) withdrawal to Bataan.

General Jones resumed command of the division when it reached Bataan and part of II Philippine Corps defending the eastern coast of Bataan.

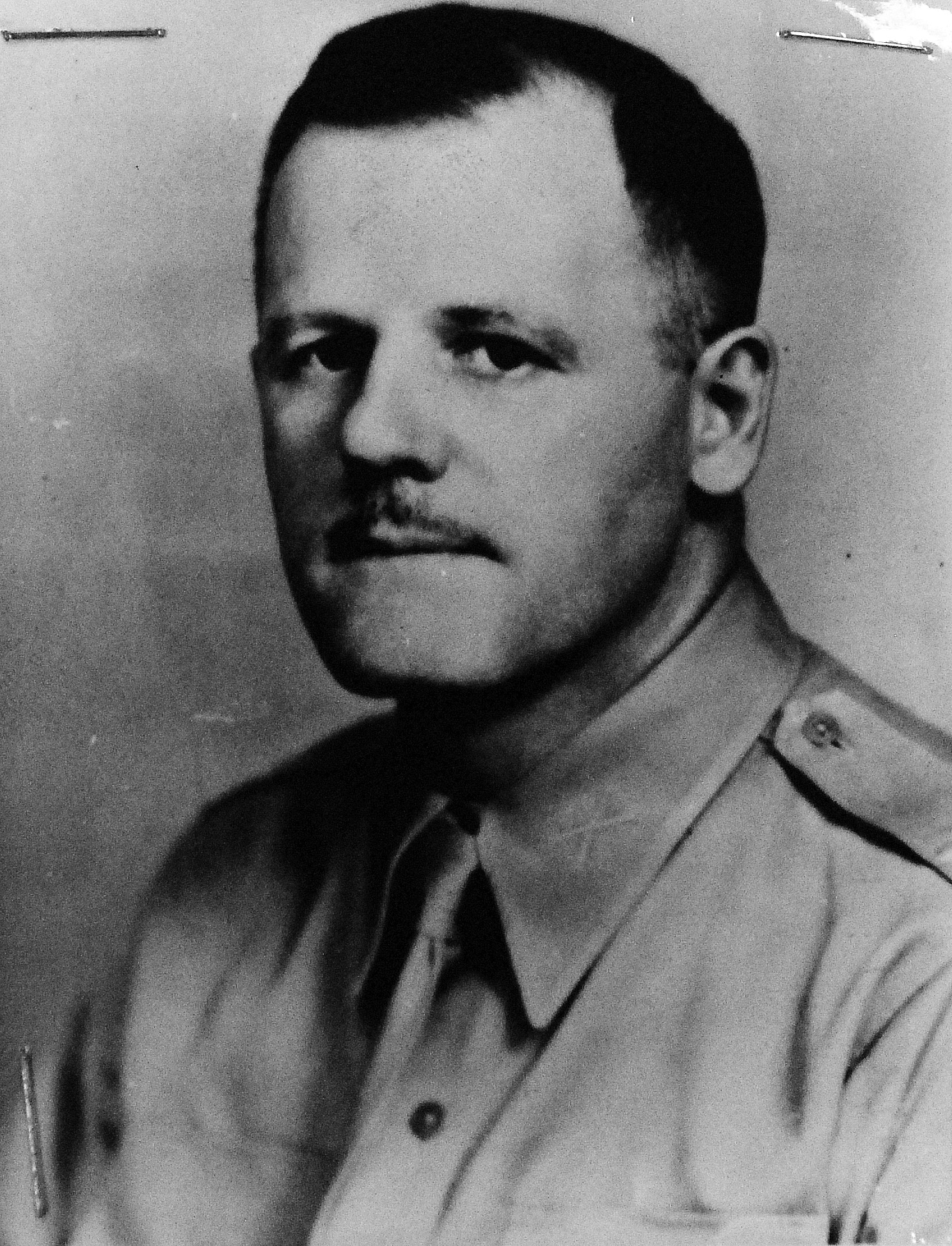
General Albert Jones, the first division commander

The division engaged Japanese assault in Bataan and the division reduced to small due to casualties and sickness. It also caused the life with one of the regimental commanders, LCol Loren P. Stewart commander of 51st Infantry Regiment, Col Adlai Young took 51st Infantry Regiment . General Jones relinquished the command of the division in March 1942 to command I Philippine Corps.

Days before surrender remnants of the division was reorganized as 51st Combat Team under Colonel Adlai Young Jr. The 3 (51st, 52nd, and 53rd) Infantry regiments are now down to battalions and the 51st Field Artillery is now down to a battery. He commanded the unit until its surrender.

== Order of battle ==
- 51st Infantry Regiment (PA) - LCol. Hunter | LCol. Loren P. Stewart (KIA) | LCol Adlai Young Jr | LCol Donovan Swanson
  - 1st Bn - 1Lt Aquilino Villanueva
  - 2nd Bn - 2Lt Luis F. Reyes
  - 3rd Bn - 2Lt Serafin Melegrito
- 52nd Infantry Regiment (PA) - LCol. Virgilio Cordero, PA
  - 1st Bn - Maj Luciano Calavera
  - 2nd Bn - Capt Condrado Uichangco
  - 3rd Bn - Maj Albert Friedlander | Maj. Edmund Wilkes
- 53rd Infantry Regiment (PA) (Col. John R. Boatwright, Inf.)
  - 1st Bn - Maj Alberto Tubionosa | Maj William Cummings
  - 2nd Bn - Maj Preston Brown
  - 3rd Bn - Capt Emilio Medenilla
- 51st Field Artillery Regiment (PA) - Col Hamilton Searight
  - 51st FA Regt HQ Company
  - 1st Bn/51st FA Regt (PA) (75mm guns, 16x) - 1Lt Segundo Velasco
  - 2nd Bn/51st FA Regt (PA) (2.95-inch pack howitzers, 4x) - 1Lt Jose P. Laurel III, Capt Francisco R. Adriano
  - 3rd Bn/51st FA Regt (PA) - 3Lt Felixberto Jimenez
- 51st Engineer Battalion (PA) - Capt Charles Pollard
- 51st Division Units
  - 51st Division Headquarters & HQ Company
  - 51st Medical Battalion
  - 51st Signal Company
  - 51st Quartermaster Company (Motorized)
  - 51st QM Transport Company (Truck)
- Provisional Battalion, 51st Infantry (Created to cover withdrawal in Quezon) - Capt Gordon Myers
  - 1st Bn - Capt Gordon Myers
  - 2nd Bn - Capt Condrado Uichangco

Battered and mounting casualties from South Luzon campaigns to delaying actions in Central Luzon, and defensive actions in Bataan. 51st Division lost its division strength and all remnants of its units are now cramped to 51st Regimental Combat Team. Col. Adlai C. Young, Inf., was put in command.

== Order of Battle (March 1942) ==
- 51st Infantry Combat Team - Col. Adlai Young Jr (Bataan)
  - 1st Bn - Maj Allan Curry
  - 2nd Bn - Col Virgilio Cordero (Cordero was moved to 72nd Infantry Regiment of 71st Infantry Division)
  - 3rd Bn - Col John Boatwright
  - Artillery Bn - LCol. Hamilton Searight

== Notable members ==
- Segundo Velasco - AFP Chief of Staff 1967 - 1968.
- Albert M. Jones - Division commander before moving to I Corps.
- Adlai Young - commanded the 51st Regimental Combat Team, the fusion of all remnants of 51st Division.
- Stuart MacDonald - Division Chief of Staff and later chief of staff of II Corps.
- Jose P. Laurel III - Son of President Jose P. Laurel (Japanese sponsored republic during the war), Diplomat

=== Sources ===
- Morton, Louis (1953). United States Army in World War II, The War in the Pacific: The Fall of the Philippines. Washington, D.C.: Center of Military History, United States Army.
- Whitman, John W. (1990). Bataan: Our Last Ditch: The Bataan Campaign, 1942. Hippocrene Books. ISBN 0-87052-877-7.

== Bibliography ==
- Morton, Louis. The Fall of the Philippines (Publication 5-2) . Retrieved on 14 Feb 2017.
