= South Luzon Force =

South Luzon Force (II Philippine Corps)
- Hukbong Timog Luzon
- Active: November 4, 1941 - April 9, 1942
- Disbanded: April 9, 1942
- Countries: Commonwealth of the Philippines; United States
- Allegiance: United States
- Branch: Army
- Type: Corps
- Role: South Luzon territorial defense force
- Size: 25,000
- Part of: Luzon Force; USAFFE
- Garrison/HQ: Limay, Bataan; Fort William McKinley, Makati, Rizal
- Engagements: Battle of Bataan; Battle of Mauban; Battle of Atimonan; Battle of Bicol

Commanders
- Notable commanders: Major General George S. Parker Major General Albert Jones (Acting)

South Luzon Force was a corps-sized unit of the US Army Forces Far East (USAFFE) active in the Philippines between 1941 and 1942. Created along with other 3 commands under the USAFFE, it was officially announced on November 4, 1941, and BGen. (Later MGen.) George M. Parker was appointed to command, making him responsible for the defense of Southern Luzon of any invasion. General Parker established his headquarters in Fort William McKinley in Rizal province.

He selected Col Stuart MacDonald as his chief of staff from December 8 to December 24, 1941, Colonel Louis R. Dougherty served as chief of staff from December 25, 1941 to January 13, 1942. Colonel Arnold J. Funk served as chief of staff from January 23 to March 2, 1942 before he was moved as chief of staff of Luzon Force. Colonel Charles Steele served as chief of staff from March 2 to April 9, 1942.

Comprising force staffs are the following officers and their designations in December 1941.

Bataan Defense Force | II Corps
Name	Rank	Designation
Ovid O. Wilson	Major	Assistant CS - G1
Dennis Moore	Major	Assistant CS - G2
Arthur Christensen	Captain	Assistant to the Assistant CS - G2
Howard D. Johnston	Lieutenant Colonel	Assistant CS - G3
Albert C. Wolfe	Major	Assistant to the Assistant CS - G3
John H. Bennett	Major	Assistant CS - G4
John Neiger	Captain	Aide to the Commanding General
Thomas M. Tarpley Jr	Major	Adjutant General
Hal C. Granberry	Major	Signal Officer
William C. Chenoweth	Major	Engineer Officer
Arthur L. Shreve	Lieutenant Colonel	Artillery Officer
W. Hinton Drummond	Major	Surgeon
Nicholas N. Milhailov	Lieutenant	Air Liaison Officer
Kearie L. Berry	Lieutenant Colonel	Quartermaster and Ordinance Officer

Initially assigned combat units are 41st Division under BGen. Vicente Lim (formerly Philippine Army Vice Chief of Staff) covering Southern Tagalog region, 51st Division under BGen. Albert Jones covering Bicol Peninsula, and 71st Division (unit from Visayas) under Col. (BGen) Clyde Selleck as reserve. However, 71st Division was transferred to North Luzon Force in late November as its Force Reserve.

At the start of hostilities in December 1941 additional units was assigned to support. 2nd Provisional Group under LCol. David Babcock equipped with T12 Gun Carriage (75mm), Provisional Field Artillery Battalion from 88th Field Artillery, 515th Coast Artillery (AA), and Provisional Infantry Brigade under BGen. Simeon De Jesus, composing of Philippine Constabulary units of Southern Luzon.

1st Regular Division of Philippine Commonwealth Army under BGen. Fidel Segundo was reactivated as its reserve but got engaged to repulse Japanese landings in Mauban and Atimonan beaches.

== War Plan Orange (WPO-3) ==
General MacArthur ordered General Parker to go to Bataan to make all preparations as he is to implement WPO3, all forces will withdraw to Bataan. The command of South Luzon Force was temporary passed on to BGen. Albert Jones commander of 51st Division. After the withdrawal is completed both officers reverted to its old command. South Luzon Force is now renamed to II Philippine Corps.

== Surrender ==
II Philippine Corps surrendered on April 9, 1942, along with other forces in Bataan after General Edward King commander of Luzon Force surrendered to Japanese 16th Division. All marched from Mariveles, Bataan to San Fernando, Pampanga under the heat of the sun without food or water later known as Death March.

== Order of Battle November 1941 to January 1942 ==
- Headquarters, South Luzon Force
- 41st Division - BGen. Vicente Lim
- 51st Division - BGen. Albert M. Jones
- 1st Regular Division - BGen. Fidel Segundo
- 51st Provisional Infantry Brigade (PC) - BGen. Simeon De Jesus, PA
- Provisional Group (SPM) - LCol. David Babcock
- 515th Coast Artillery (AA) - LCol. Henry Peck

== Order of Battle January to April 1942 (Renamed II Philippine Corps) ==
- Headquarters, South Luzon Force
- 41st Division - BGen. Vicente Lim
- 51st Division - BGen. Albert M. Jones
- 91st Division - BGen. Luther R. Stevens
- Provisional Group (SPM) - LCol. David Babcock
- 515th Coast Artillery (AA) - LCol. Henry Peck
- 57th US Infantry Regimental Team (PS)
- Provisional Field Artillery Brigade - Col. Albert Ives
