= Virgilio N. Cordero Jr. =

United States Army officer (1893–1980)

Virgilio Norberto Cordero
- Virgilio N. Cordero Sr.
- Born: June 6, 1893; San Juan, Puerto Rico
- Died: June 9, 1980 (aged 87); Naval Station Roosevelt Roads in Ceiba, Puerto Rico
- Burial place: Puerto Rico National Cemetery in Bayamón, Puerto Rico
- Military career
- Allegiance: United States of America
- Branch: United States Army
- Service years: 1917-1953
- Rank: Colonel
- Commands: Battalion Commander of the 31st Infantry Regiment
- Conflicts: World War I, World War II
- Awards: Silver Star Medal with two oak leaf clusters, Legion of Merit, Bronze Star Medal and Purple Heart Medal

Colonel Virgilio Norberto Cordero Jr. (June 6, 1893 – June 9, 1980) was a Puerto Rican soldier who served in the United States Army. Cordero authored two books about his experiences as a prisoner of war, and his participation in the Bataan Death March of World War II.

== Early years ==
Cordero was born in San Juan, the capital city of Puerto Rico when the island was still a Spanish colony. There he received his primary and secondary education. He moved to the United States and earned a bachelor's degree in engineering from Penn State College of Engineering in 1917. That year he also graduated from the Army ROTC (Reserve Officers' Training Corps) program of that educational institution. He then entered the officers candidate school in Madison Barracks, New York and graduated with the rank of second lieutenant.

== Military career ==
Cordero enlisted in the United States Army after graduating from PSU. He served in World War I and by 1922, according to the Official Army register, he held the rank of captain of infantry.

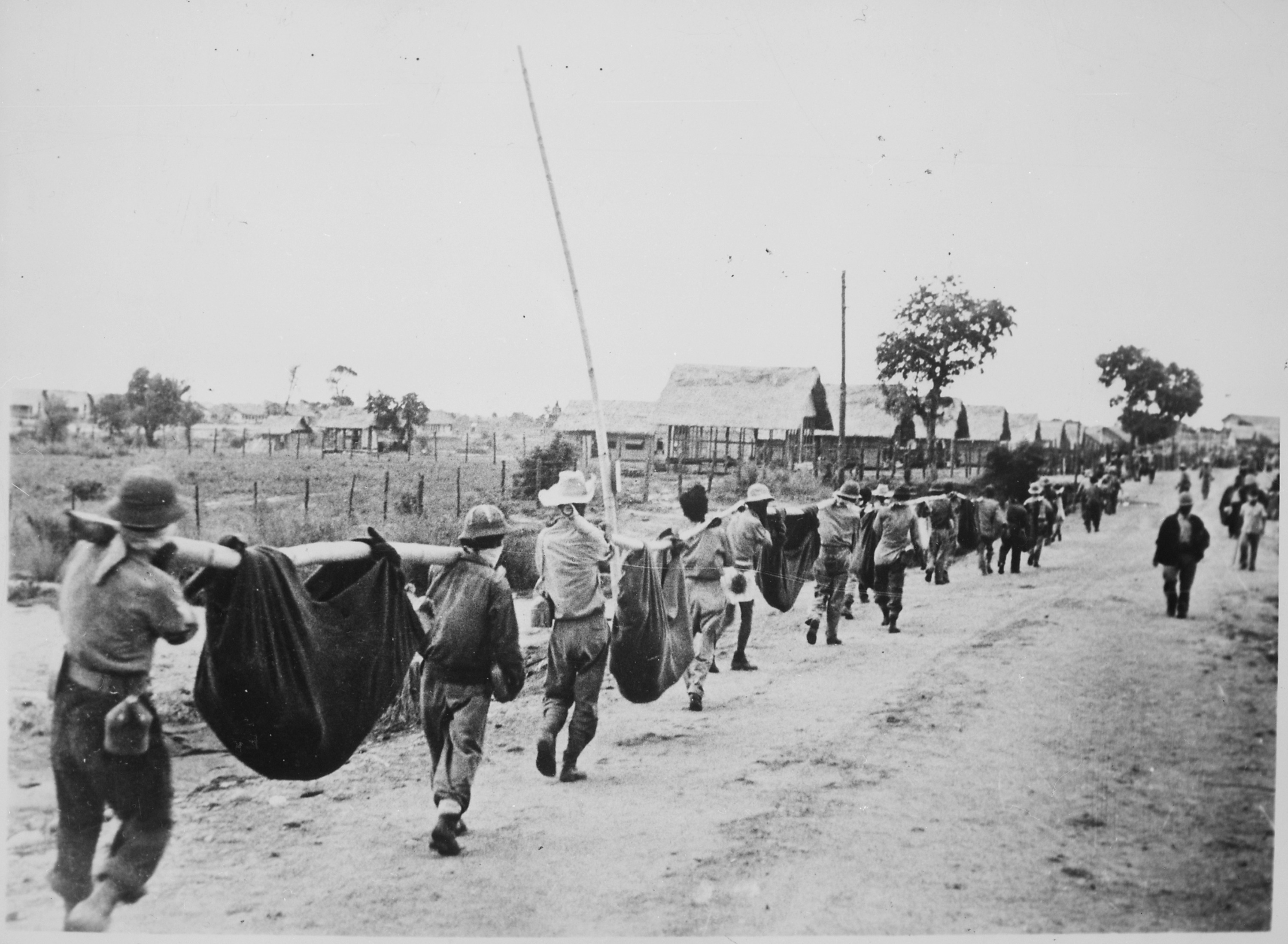
American prisoners of war, in a burial detail, carry the bodies of those who died weeks that followed the Bataan Death March

On December 8, 1941, when Japanese planes attacked the U.S. military installations in the Philippines, Cordero, who by then held the rank of colonel, was the Battalion Commander of the 31st Infantry Regiment. The 31st Infantry covered the withdrawal of American and Philippine forces to the Bataan Peninsula and fought for four months, despite the fact that no help could come in from the outside after much of the United States Pacific Fleet was destroyed at Pearl Harbor and mid-ocean bases at Guam and Wake Island were lost.

Cordero was named Regimental Commander of the 52nd Infantry Regiment, 51st Infantry Division of the new Filipino Army, thus becoming the first Puerto Rican to command a Filipino Army regiment. He commanded 72nd Infantry Regiment (PA) on the last days of Battle of Bataan. The Bataan Defense Force surrendered on April 9, 1942, and Cordero and his men underwent torture and humiliation during the Bataan Death March and nearly four years of captivity. Cordero was one of nearly 1,600 members of the 31st Infantry who were taken as prisoners. Half of these men perished while prisoners of the Japanese forces. Cordero along with other senior US military officers were liberated in the Mukden POW Camp after the unconditional surrender of Japan on September 2, 1945.

From July 1946 to November 1947, he served in the US military base in Caserta, Italy before returning to the United States. While in Italy, he was awarded a Silver Star Medal and the Legion of Merit for his actions in Bataan.

In 2020 Virgilio N. Cordero was Posthumously inducted to the Puerto Rico Veterans Hall of Fame.

=== Silver Star citation ===
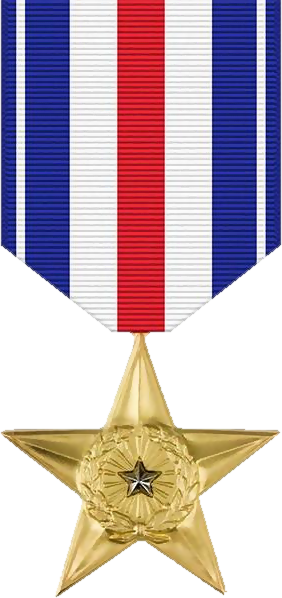

Virgil N. Cordero

UNITED STATES ARMY'
Company: Commanding Officer
Regiment: 72nd Infantry Regiment
Division: 71st Division, Philippine Army

The President of the United States of America, authorized by Act of Congress July 9, 1918, takes pleasure in presenting a Bronze Oak Leaf Cluster in Lieu of a Second Award of the Silver Star to Colonel (Infantry) Virgil N. Cordero (ASN: 0-7472), United States Army, for conspicuous gallantry and intrepidity in action against the enemy while serving as Commanding Officer, 72nd Infantry Regiment, 71st Division, Philippine Army, in action in Bataan, Luzon, Philippine Islands, on 9 April 1942. Upon the termination of the fighting in Bataan, Colonel Cordero was occupying a defensive position near Bagac while awaiting final surrender instructions. During an inspection of the front lines, he heard small arms fire nearby and, inasmuch as orders had been issued not to fire unless attacked by the enemy, he immediately proceeded toward the firing and found a burning ammunition truck being attacked contrary to the terms of the negotiations. Colonel Cordero, with no thought of his own safety, personally directed the extinguishment of the dangerous fire. By his clam and fearless leadership and unhesitating willingness to risk his life, Colonel Cordero prevented an unnecessary engagement with the enemy and loss of life among American soldiers. Colonel Cordero's gallant actions and selfless devotion to duty, without regard for his own safety, were in keeping with the highest traditions of military service and reflect great credit upon himself, his unit, and the United States Army. General Orders: Headquarters, U.S. Forces, Pacific, General Orders No. 276 (1945)

== Post-World War II ==
Cordero continued to serve in the military retiring in 1953 after 36 years of service. Cordero wrote about his experiences as a prisoner of war and what he went through during the Bataan Death March. He authored My Experiences during the War with Japan, which was published in 1950. In 1957, he authored a revised Spanish version titled Bataan y la Marcha de la Muerte; Volume 7 of Colección Vida e Historia, published by: A. Aguado.

On June 9, 1980, Cordero died of lung ailment in the U.S. Naval Hospital at Roosevelt Roads Naval Station in Ceiba, Puerto Rico. He was buried with full military honors in Section G, Plot 3 in the Puerto Rico National Cemetery located in the city of Bayamón, Puerto Rico. Cordero was survived by his wife, the former Gloria Haydon (1922–1981) of Needham, Massachusetts, four children and three grandchildren.

== Military decorations ==
Among the military decorations which Cordero earned were the following:

1st Row	Silver Star Medal with two bronze oak leaf clusters		Legion of Merit
2nd Row	Bronze Star Medal	Purple Heart	Prisoner of War Medal
3rd Row	World War I Victory Medal	Asiatic Pacific Campaign Medal	World War II Victory Medal
4th Row	Philippine Liberation Medal	National Defense Service Medal	Korean Service Medal with a silver star device.

Tabs:

- 31st Infantry Regiment

== See also ==
- List of Puerto Ricans
- List of Puerto Rican military personnel
- Puerto Ricans in World War II
- Military history of Puerto Rico
- Hispanic Americans in World War II
