= George M. Parker (United States Army officer) =

United States Army general

George Marshall Parker Jr.
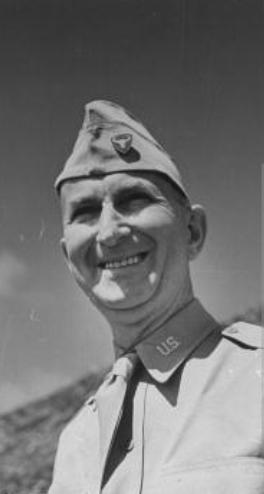
- Born: April 17, 1889; Sac City, Iowa
- Died: October 23, 1968 (aged 79) Portland, Oregon
- Allegiance: United States of America
- Branch: United States Army
- Service years: 1910–1946
- Rank: Major General
- Commands: Philippine II Corps
- Conflicts: Pancho Villa Expedition; World War I World War II
- Awards: Distinguished Service Medal

George Marshall Parker Jr. (April 17, 1889 – October 23, 1968) was an officer of the United States Army with the rank of major general. General Parker commanded the Philippine II Corps during the Battle of Bataan.

== Biography ==
Parker was born and raised in Iowa and was commissioned a 2nd lieutenant of Infantry in the U.S. Army in 1910. He rose to the rank of major during World War I. Parker was a distinguished graduate of the Command and General Staff School in 1923 and graduated from the Army War College in 1925. He was promoted to lieutenant colonel in October 1934 and to colonel in January 1939.

Parker was assigned to the Philippines shortly before the Japanese invasion and was promoted to brigadier general in April 1941.

=== World War II ===
On November 4, 1941, shortly before the Japanese invasion of the Philippines, Parker was assigned the command of the South Luzon Force, which consisted of the 41st Division, 51st Division and the Battery A of 86th Field Artillery Regiment of the Philippine Scouts. The 41st Division was centered around Nasugbu, Batangas and Tagaytay Ridge to meet any landings by the Japanese on the western shores of Southern Luzon, while the 51st was assigned on the eastern shores of in the event the Japanese would land in the vicinity of Lamon Bay.

On December 23, two weeks after the Japanese landings, the SLF was ordered to Bataan as General Douglas MacArthur activated War Plan Orange. On December 24 Parker was appointed commander of the Bataan Defense Force (BDF) and promoted to major general. On January 6, 1942, the BDF was converted to the Philippines II Corps, during the Battle of Bataan.

Parker surrendered the II Philippine Corps on April 9, 1942 and was a prisoner of war until the Japanese surrender in August 1945. He was one of 18 American Army generals captured in the Philippines.

General Parker retired from the Army on September 30, 1946. He moved to Oregon and died at a nursing home in Portland. He was interred at the Mount Crest Abbey Mausoleum in Salem, Oregon on October 25, 1968.

== Decorations ==
Army Distinguished Service Medal
Prisoner of War Medal (posthumous)
Mexican Border Service Medal
World War I Victory Medal
American Defense Service Medal with "Foreign Service" clasp
Asiatic-Pacific Campaign Medal with one campaign star
World War II Victory Medal
Philippine Defense Medal with service star

== Dates of rank ==
No insignia in 1910	Second lieutenant, Regular Army: May 18, 1910
	First lieutenant, Regular Army: July 1, 1916
	Captain, Regular Army: May 17, 1917
	Major, National Army: June 7, 1918
	Major, Regular Army: July 1, 1920
	Lieutenant colonel, Regular Army: October 1, 1934
	Colonel, Regular Army: January 1, 1939
	Brigadier general, Army of the United States: April 19, 1941
	Major general, Army of the United States: December 18, 1941
	Major general, Retired List: September 30, 1946

Source: U.S. Army Register, 1948.
