= Albert M. Jones =

United States Army general (1890–1967)

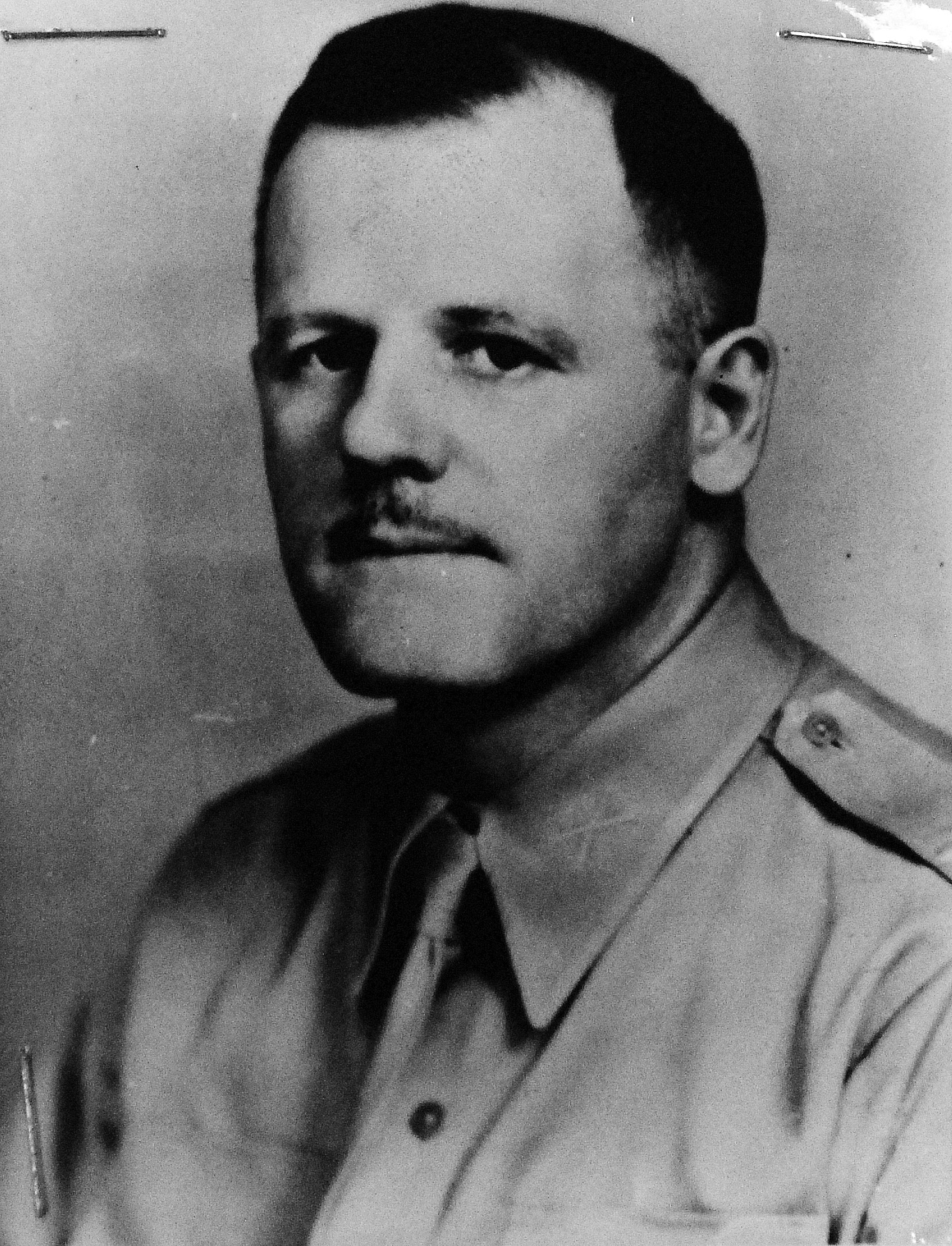
- Born: July 20, 1890; Quincy, Massachusetts, United States
- Died: May 12, 1967 (aged 76); San Francisco, California, United States
- Burial place: Golden Gate National Cemetery
- Military career
- Branch: United States Army
- Service years: 1911–1952
- Rank: Major General
- Service number: 0-3186
- Commands: I Corps (Philippines); South Luzon Force(Acting); 51st Division (Philippines); 31st Infantry Regiment
- Conflicts: World War I; World War II; Battle of Bataan (POW)
- Awards: Distinguished Service Cross; Distinguished Service Medal; Silver Star Medal (2); Legion of Merit; Bronze Star Medal (2); Prisoner of War Medal

Albert Monmouth Jones (July 20, 1890 – May 12, 1967) was an American major general and known for his command of the 51st Philippine Division and subsequently I Philippine Corps during the Japanese invasion in World War II.

Born in Quincy, Massachusetts, Jones was commissioned as a second lieutenant of infantry in 1911. He served as a temporary major during World War I.

Jones was an honors graduate of the Command and General Staff School in 1924 and graduated from the Army War College in 1932. He was promoted to lieutenant colonel in August 1935 and colonel in November 1940.

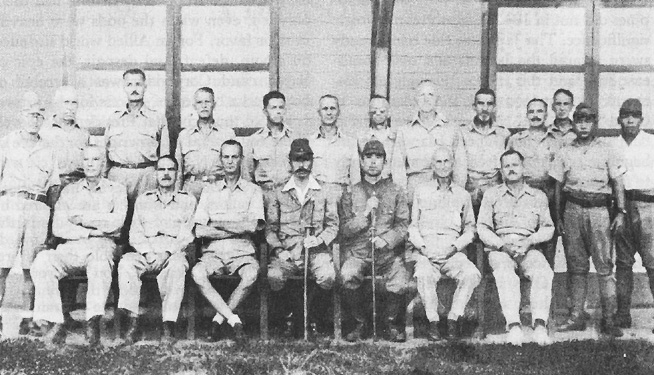
American generals in Japanese captivity, July 1942; Jones is seated at the far right.

Sent to the Philippines in 1940, Jones was initially given command of the 31st Infantry Regiment. He was subsequently assigned to organize and command the 51st Division. Before withdrawal to Bataan, General Jones temporary took command of South Luzon Force as General Parker was ordered to go in advanced and prepare Bataan for the retreat of all forces there. After reaching Bataan, Jones reverted to his command of 51st Division commanding it until March 1942. After creating Luzon Force which General Wainwright was selected to command, Jones was made commanding general of I Corps (Philippines). He received temporary promotions to brigadier general in December 1941 and major general in March 1942. Jones was awarded the Distinguished Service Cross by General Douglas MacArthur in February 1942 for extraordinary heroism as Commanding General of the South Luzon Force/I Corps from december 24, 1941 to January 1, 1942, he has also earned a Silver Star for gallantry as I Philippine Corps commander and The Legion of Merit for post-war work. After surrendering to Japanese forces in April 1942, he spent over three years as a prisoner of war.

After the war, Jones served as chief of the Military Advisory Group in the Philippines. His wartime promotion to major general was made permanent in January 1948. He retired from active duty on July 31, 1952.

Jones died at Letterman General Hospital in San Francisco. He was interred at Golden Gate National Cemetery.
