= Leyte Brigade =

Leyte-Samar Force
- Active: October 1941 – May 1942
- Disbanded: May 13, 1942
- Countries: United States; Philippines
- Allegiance: United States Army
- Branch: Army; Navy
- Type: Infantry
- Role: Defense
- Size: 4,000
- Part of: Visayan Force; Visayas-Mindanao Force
- Garrison/HQ: Camp Downes, Tacloban, Leyte
- Equipment: M1917 Enfield Rifles; M1923 Thompson Submachineguns; M1917 Browning .30 Caliber Machineguns; Filipino Bolo

Commanders
- Notable commanders: Colonel Theodore Cornell; Lieutenant Colonel Juan Causing

Insignia
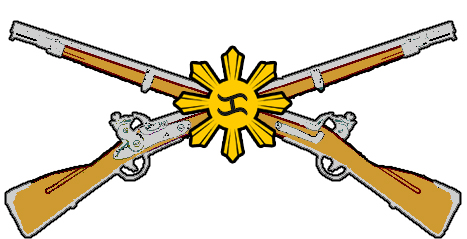
- Identification symbol

Leyte Force is a brigade size unit that was organized in Leyte Island in the Philippines during World War II. It was commanded by Colonel Theodore Cornell of US Army until its surrender in May 1942 upon orders of General William Sharp commander of Visayas-Mindanao Force.

== Background ==
After 91st Infantry Division under Brigadier General Luther S. Stevens, was ordered to Luzon to bolster its defense. The island of Leyte was left with only 93rd Infantry Regiment the last component unit of 91st Division as it was just being organized. Colonel Theodore Cornell commanded the Leyte and Samar Sector but Lieutenant Colonel Ben-Hur Chastaine commanded 93rd Infantry Regiment. To strengthen its defense 81st Infantry Regiment under Lieutenant Colonel Ruperto Kangleon was transferred from Bohol. The regiments comprised the Samar Provisional Infantry Brigade which Colonel Chastaine commanded. The command of 93rd Infantry fell to Major John Goldtrap, trainings and preparation was intensified in November and while the war progressed in December.

=== Staffs ===
1Lieutenant Irvine C. Spotte, a reservist who is a former manager of Samar Mining Company became the force Chief Engineer.

=== Transfer of Samar Brigade ===
In January 1942, General Sharp commander of Visayas-Mindanao Force ordered the transfer of the brigade to Mindanao. This was complied and the brigade arrived in Mindanao via Surigao and was posted in Agusan Sector. Colonel Chastaine became its sector commander along with Lieutenant Colonel Arden Boellner who now commands 81st Infantry.

=== Reorganization of Leyte ===
With Samar Brigade's departure Leyte was left with no organized troops, Colonel Cornell established Leyte Provisional Infantry Regiment under Major Juan Causing. Later the regiment was renamed as 94th Provisional Infantry Regiment. No other regiment was formed due to lack of weapons to arm it.

In March 1942, the Visayas-Mindanao Force was split into 2 commands. Leyte Force now under the control of Visayan Force under Brigadier General Bradford Chynoweth with headquarters in Cebu Island.

=== Surrender ===
In April 17, General Wainwright ordered General Sharp to reinstitute Visayas-Mindanao Force to take control other forces in the Visayas outside of Cebu as Visayan Force could no longer function. Communication could no longer established outside Cebu. Leyte Force returned to Visayas-Mindanao Force command. In May 12, it received an order to surrender all units to the Japanese forces. The Brigade was dissolved but not all soldiers surrendered to the Japanese but dispersed to the mountains and joined guerilla units established by Major Causing in Samar, Lieutenant Blas Miranda in Leyte, and later Colonel Ruperto Kangleon.

== See also ==
- Visayas Force
- Visayas-Mindanao Force
- 91st Infantry Division
- 93rd Infantry Regiment
