= Battle of Binalonan =

1941 battle in the Philippines

- Part of Japanese invasion of Lingayen Gulf
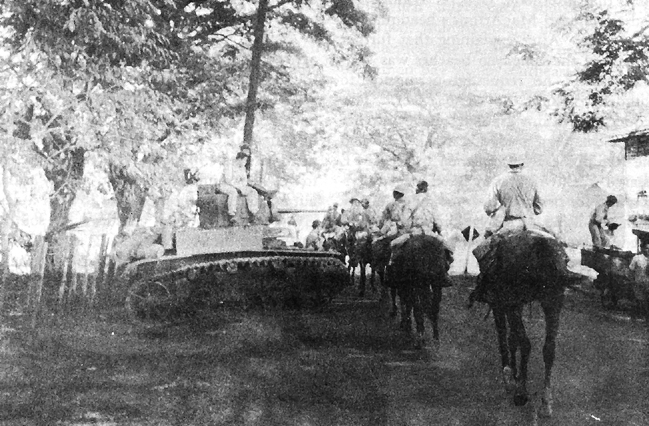
- The 26th Philippine Cavalry, which was the principal defending force, on the day before the battle
Date	24 December 1941
Location	Binalonan, Pangasinan, Philippines
Result	Japanese victory

Belligerents
Empire of Japan	United States; Commonwealth of the Philippines

Commanders and leaders
Yuichi Tsuchihashi; Isamu Yanagi	Jonathan Wainwright; Clinton A. Pierce; James D. Carter; Lloyd Biggs; Fernando Nicolas

Units involved
48th Division: 47th Infantry Regiment; 1st Formosan Infantry Regiment; 2nd Formosan Infantry Regiment; 4th Armored Regiment	Philippine Division: 26th Cavalry Regiment; 192nd Tank Battalion; 91st Division: 91st Infantry Regiment; 71st Division: 71st Infantry Regiment; 72nd Infantry Regiment

The Battle of Binalonan (Filipino: Labanan sa Binalonan, Pangasinese: Labanan ed Binalonan, Ilocano: Gubat ti Binalonan) was an engagement between joint Filipino-American forces and the Imperial Japanese Army on the 24 December 1941. The engagement took place in and around the town of Binalonan, Pangasinan and was part of the wider Japanese invasion of Lingayen Gulf. General Masaharu Homma, after landing at the gulf on 21–22 December, had split his forces into conquering different parts of the relatively flat plain of Luzon in order to advance south towards Manila. The 48th Division of the IJA was tasked with securing the eastern part of this plain, and had already advanced through the towns of Rosario and Pozorrubio swiftly. Defending the town of Binalonan was a large contingent of the 26th Philippine Scouts and scattered elements of the 91st and 71st Philippine Divisions, along with a few tanks from the 192nd Tank Battalion, that had retreated hastily from Rosario. The two belligerents met on 24 December and fought in and around the town, eventually breaking through the line after hours of heavy fighting. The 48th Division would continue south through Luzon and eventually capture Manila by January 1942, whilst the U.S. forces withdrew to the Bataan Peninsula, being besieged there. The Battle of Binalonan was the second-to-last recorded instance of a U.S. Cavalry regiment charging in battle, with the final instance being on 16 January 1942, coincidentally by the 26th Philippine Scouts.

== Background ==
The Japanese Army had invaded Lingayen Gulf on the 21–22 December 1941, establishing a beach-head at Agoo and Damortis. The IJA poured troops into the area and subsequently began to move inland, where hastily constructed defenses were made in order to try and repel the invaders. These, however, were ineffective, as the IJA managed to secure most of La Union province by 23 December. The most significant struggle, however, was at Rosario, where defensive positions of the 71st, 72nd, 91st, and 26th Regiments along the Bued River managed to hold off the IJA for several hours before artillery and tanks from the 48th Division forced a withdrawal into the towns of Pozorrubio and Binalonan. General Jonathan Wainwright, who was in charge of the North Luzon Force, ordered his units to try and hold out in order to stall the advance of the IJA. The 26th, though having been battered, moved out to Binalonan on the late hours of the 23 December, along with the 91st Combat Team and elements of the 71st and 91st Infantry Regiment leftover from Rosario. The 48th Division was advancing through the eastern portion of Luzon, hoping to reach the Agno River within the next few days, when they encountered the American defenses.

== Battle ==
At 05:00 on 24 December, the 4th Armored Regiment, consisting of mostly Ha-Go and Chi-Ha tanks, encountered the northwest forward positions of the 26th Philippine Scouts, who were aided by the 72nd Infantry and elements of the 71st Infantry that went south instead of west to Baguio. The Filipino and American infantry mounted their horses and began to fight the armored column and the infantry, with the defenders utilizing frag grenades to disable the tanks before they could inflict heavy casualties. A splinter group of the 4th Armored Regiment decided to swing around the defenses, moving far west and south before moving north on the town. General Yuichi Tsuchihashi, the commander of the 48th Division, noticed that fighting had stalled, and ordered the 1st and 2nd Formosan Regiments to assist the 4th Armored in breaking through the lines. The 1st and 2nd Formosan managed to push back portions of the 26th, but were still unable to reach the town. At around 11:30, General Wainwright was moving up into the town in order to assess the situation. The splinter group of the 4th Armored fought Wainwright's convoy, with the general barely avoiding capture. Whilst the 26th Cavalry had held off the 4th Armored for the most part, they were starting to run out of grenades; mounted scouts went into town and, with the aid of soldiers from the 91st Infantry, filled up Coca-Cola bottles with gasoline and stuffed them with dried banana leaves in order to create improvised Molotov cocktails. The 91st Infantry was ordered to try and repel the tanks moving on the town from the south; hastily, anti-tank guns and improvised grenades were brought up to meet the splinter group of the 4th Armored. The Ha-Go tanks that made up most of this splinter group were ambushed by the 91st Infantry and a few M3 Tanks from the 192nd Tank Battalion, forcing the splinter group to retreat and preventing the town from being encircled. As fighting progressed, certain troops of the 26th Cavalry began to dwindle on supplies; ammo couriers were sent to run back into the town of Binalonan, but due to the distance between the front and the town, the regiment risked their positions being overrun before the couriers could make it back with their supplies. Certain troops of the 26th Cavalry decided to buy time and gamble; when the two regiments of Formosan Infantry assaulted, the troops of the 26th Cavalry launched a mounted charge. The Formosan regiments, which were poorly disciplined and made of up conscripts, hastily retreated. Soon after, couriers returned from the town and brought fresh supplies to continue the defense.. The Japanese offensive was considerably slowed after the retreat of the Formosan infantry, forcing General Yuichi to try and break the defensive line with his elite regiment of infantry: the 47th Regiment. The 26th Cavalry numbered around 450 near 13:00 when the two battalions of the 47th Regiment under Colonel Isamu Yanagi were called. The 47th was an elite regiment of infantry, made up of highly disciplined veterans from the Battles of Shanghai and Nanking, and had experience fighting Chinese guerillas in Guangdong and Guangxi. The 26th offered significant resistance to the 47th and the accompanying Formosan Infantry and tanks, but were eventually forced to withdrawal at 15:30. The 48th Division consolidated its position north of Binalonan and regrouped after the heavy fighting, whilst the 26th and 91st Philippine Regiments withdrew south. Despite having been forced to withdrawal, the American forces had successfully delayed the Japanese advance and allowed for the preparation of the D-1 Line to be completed.

== Aftermath ==
The delaying action of the 26th Cavalry and 91st Infantry halted the Japanese advance on the eastern portion of Luzon, allowing for the defensive lines in Luzon to be completed, buying time for the defenders of the island and causing the Japanese Army to, for the next few days, exercise caution in their maneuvers. General Wainwright was thoroughly pleased with the fighting of the 26th, stating:

I was personally present during a portion of this fight and cannot speak in too glowing terms of the gallantry and intrepidity displayed by Colonel Pierce and all other officers and men of the 26th Cavalry on this occasion. This devoted little band of horsemen, weakened by detachments and heavy casualties sustained at Damortis on the 22nd of December, held up the advance guard and caused the deployment of the enemy's main column. It effected a delay of nine hours and maintained the best traditions of the American cavalry. The 26th Cavalry clearly lived up to its code name of MIGHTY that day. I speak of this from the point of view of an eyewitness.

Afterwards, the 48th Division and other Japanese divisions would converge on the D-1 Line, breaking through the defenses of Northern Luzon and pushing the defenders out into the Bataan Peninsula through the following weeks, with Manila being declared an open city in January 1942; the 26th Cavalry would continue to use their mounted infantry to delay the Japanese advance to Bataan and, during the subsequent battle, would offer fierce resistance to the Japanese invaders. Ultimately, however, the regiment was forced to surrender in April 1942, with splinter elements of the unit escaping into the jungle to act as guerilla forces in the mountains.
