= Isamu Yanagi =

Officer in the Imperial Japanese Army

- 柳 勇
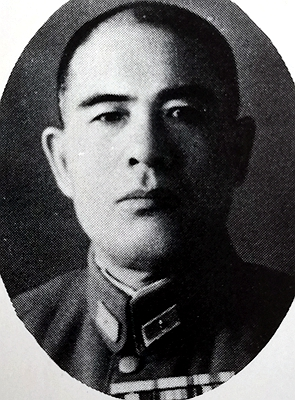
- Born: October 21, 1891; Fukuoka Prefecture
- Died: November 3, 1989 (aged 98)
- Military career
- Allegiance: Japanese Empire
- Branch: Imperial Japanese Army
- Service years: 1913 - 1945
- Rank: Major-General
- Commands: 47th Infantry Regiment; Head of Security for Beijing
- Awards: Order of the Sacred Treasure, Second Class

Isamu Yanagi (柳 勇, Yanagi Isamu; 21 October 1891 - 3 November 1989) was an officer in the Imperial Japanese Army during the Second Sino-Japanese War and World War II.

== Life ==
He was born in Fukuoka Prefecture in 1891 and enlisted in the Imperial Japanese Army in 1913. He attended the Imperial Japanese Army Academy and graduated in 1929 as a Second Lieutenant and was posted in various areas. In 1939, he was given his colonelcy assigned as an instructor for non-commissioned officers at the Imperial Japanese Army's training school. In 1940, he was assigned to command the elite 47th Infantry Regiment and proceeded to take part in the Battle of South Guangxi.

Later, he would command the regiment during the Japanese invasion of Lingayen Gulf, participating in landings at Agoo and the battles of Rosario, San Fabian, and Binalonan before moving on to Manila and the Tagaytay ridge in January 1942. Afterwards, his regiment was assigned to take part in the Invasion of Java, for which it is noted that Yanagi's regiment advanced extremely quickly to the city of Surabaya, leaving the other elements of the larger 48th Division behind. His final post in the 47th Regiment would be in the Invasion of East Timor fighting Dutch and Australian forces.

For his work in these campaigns, he was awarded the Order of the Sacred Treasure. He would later be promoted to Major-General and assigned security detail to the Beijing area in 1943 and then transferred to reserve on 15 August 1945, and then was discharged 30 August. He died on 3 November 1989 of natural causes.
