= Morokrembangan Naval Air Base =

Base in Surabaya, Indonesia, 1925–1960s

Morokrembangan Naval Air Base Pangkalan Udara Angkatan Laut Morokrembangan
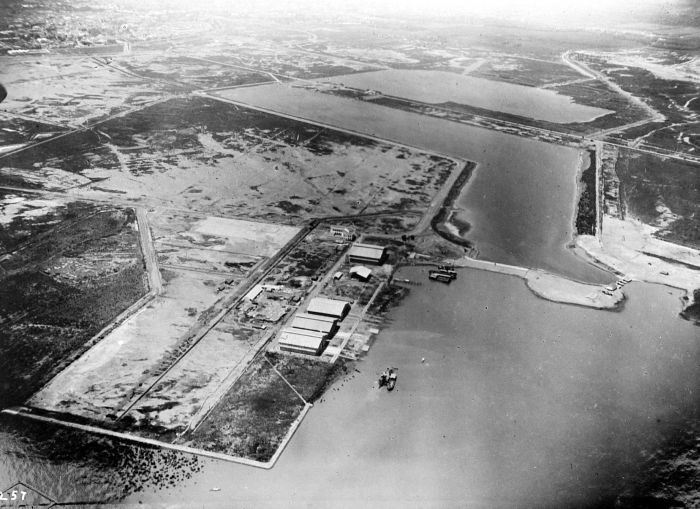
- Aerial view of Morokrembangan Naval Air Base in interwar period
- IATA: none; ICAO: ~~WRSP~~

Summary
- Airport type: Military
- Operator: Royal Netherlands Navy (1925-1942, 1945-1950); Imperial Japanese Navy (1942-1945); Indonesian Navy (1950-1960s)
- Location: Morokrembangan, Surabaya, East Java, Indonesia
- Elevation AMSL: 9 ft / 3 m
- Coordinates: 7°13′20″S 112°42′41″E

Map
- Location in Surabaya Location in Indonesia

Runways
Direction	Length		Surface
Direction	m	ft	Surface
01/19	1,500	4,800	Asphalt
12/30	1,400	4,500	Asphalt

Morokrembangan Naval Air Base (Dutch: Marinevliegkamp Morokrembangan, (Note: In Dutch sometimes also written as Marine-vliegkamp Morokrembangan or Dutch: marine vliegkamp Morokrembangan.) Indonesian: Pangkalan Udara Angkatan Laut Morokrembangan) was a former naval air base of the Royal Netherlands Navy in the Dutch East Indies. The air base was located in Soerabaja and used by the Netherlands Naval Aviation Service. At the start of the Pacific War Morokrembangan Naval Air Base was the largest and best equipped naval air base in Southeast Asia and considered to be one of the most modern naval air bases in the world.

After the handover of sovereignty to Indonesia in December 1949, the air base was used by the Indonesian Naval Aviation until 1960s, when it was closed and replaced by the new Juanda Naval Air Base.

== History ==
The construction of the air base was started with the land reclamation at the mouth of Krembangan River by the colonial government in 1918, which was finished in 1919, while the construction of seaplane hangars and other buildings was started in 1920. In 1925 it was decided to move the main naval air base from Tandjong Priok to Soerabaja. In the same year, on 30 June 1925, Morokrembangan Naval Air Base was put into service. (Note: Walaardt Sacré, van den Abeelen and Spittel claim that Morokrembangan Naval Air Base was put into service on 30 July 1925.) While the air base had been put into service on 30 June 1925 it was still being equipped during the remainder of the year.

The main task of Morokrembangan Naval Air Base was to provide maintenance for the material and equipment of the Netherlands Naval Aviation Service. To this end the base was equipped with several workstations, factories, hangars and runways that were continuously expanded and modernized over the years. In addition, it also had a port for seaplanes. Besides maintenance the base also provided pilot training. The air base was also used for commercial flight by the Royal Dutch East Indies Airways (KNILM).

=== Second World War ===
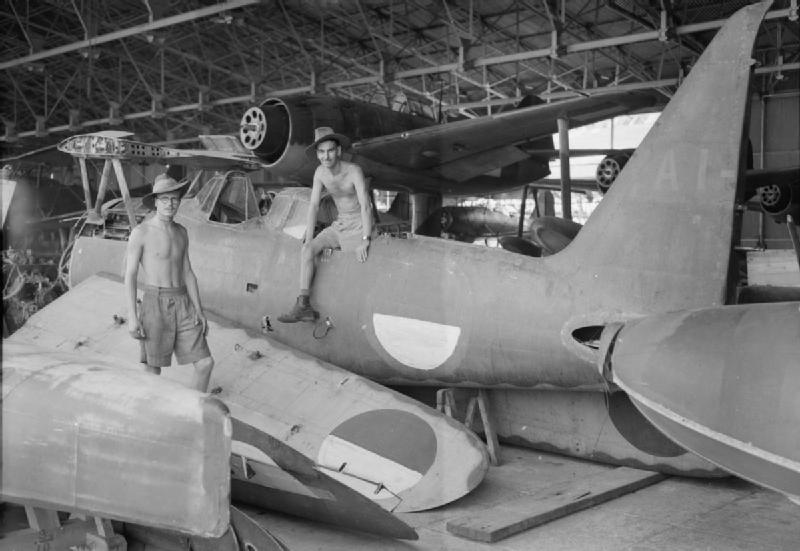
British airmen with various captured Japanese seaplanes, 1946

A recon aircraft from Tainan Air Group scouted the air base on 1–2 February 1942. Morokrembangan Naval Air Base was one of the targets during the first Japanese air raid on Soerabaja on 3 February. During this attack three Dornier Do 24 K, two PBY Catalina, two Fokker T.IV W, three Dornier Do J Wal and two Ryan trainer aircraft were destroyed. Morokrembangan was attacked again on 5 February, with the Japanese bombers escorted by 27 A6M Zero and from Tainan Air Group and 11 A6M Zero from 3rd Air Group. The raid destroyed six Dutch navy aircraft and various facilities of the air base. On 3 March, a force of 75 Japanese aircraft, 27 of which are bombers, attacked Soerabaja. Some of the dive bombers attacked Morokrembangan.

Soerabaja was captured by the 48th Division of the Imperial Japanese Army on 8 March and the air base soon came under Japanese control. The 33rd Air Group of Imperial Japanese Navy, consisted of eight Aichi D3A and eight Nakajima B5N bombers, was stationed in Morokrembangan air base in April 1942.

=== Post-Second World War ===
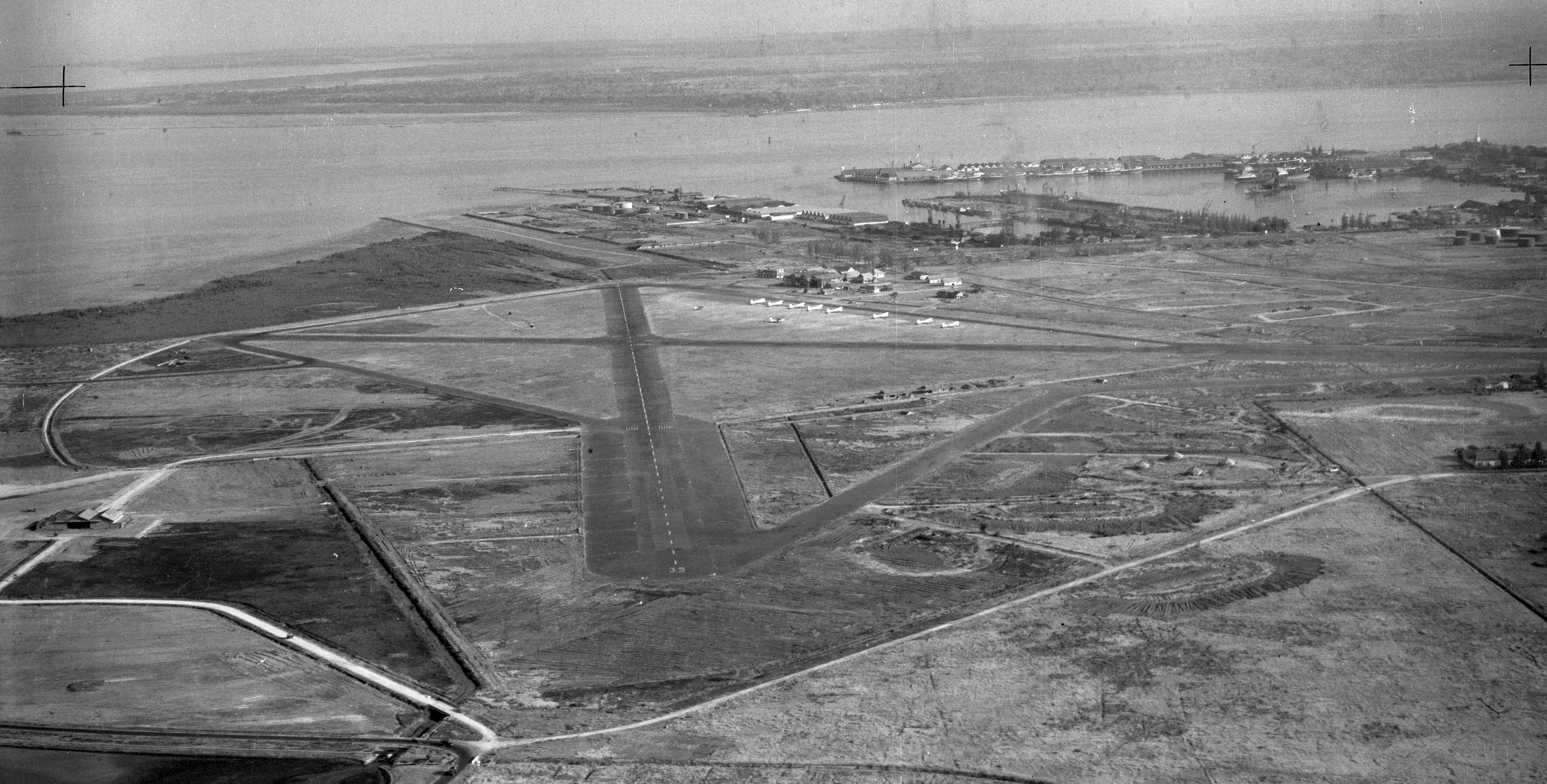
Aerial view of Morokrembangan Naval Air Base in 1948

After the Proclamation of Indonesian Independence on 17 August 1945, the air base was taken over by Indonesian republican forces. The Republican forces also captured the IJN aircraft stationed there, although they lacked qualified pilots to fly the aircraft. The air base was bombarded by Royal Navy ships during the Battle of Surabaya in October–November 1945. At the conclusion of the battle, the air base was briefly used by the Royal Air Force, and later it was given back to the Netherlands Naval Aviation Service. In November 1946 two Japanese Aichi E13A seaplanes were loaded on Dutch escort carrier HNLMS Karel Doorman at Morokrembangan. These were later transported to the Netherlands to showcase to the Dutch public.

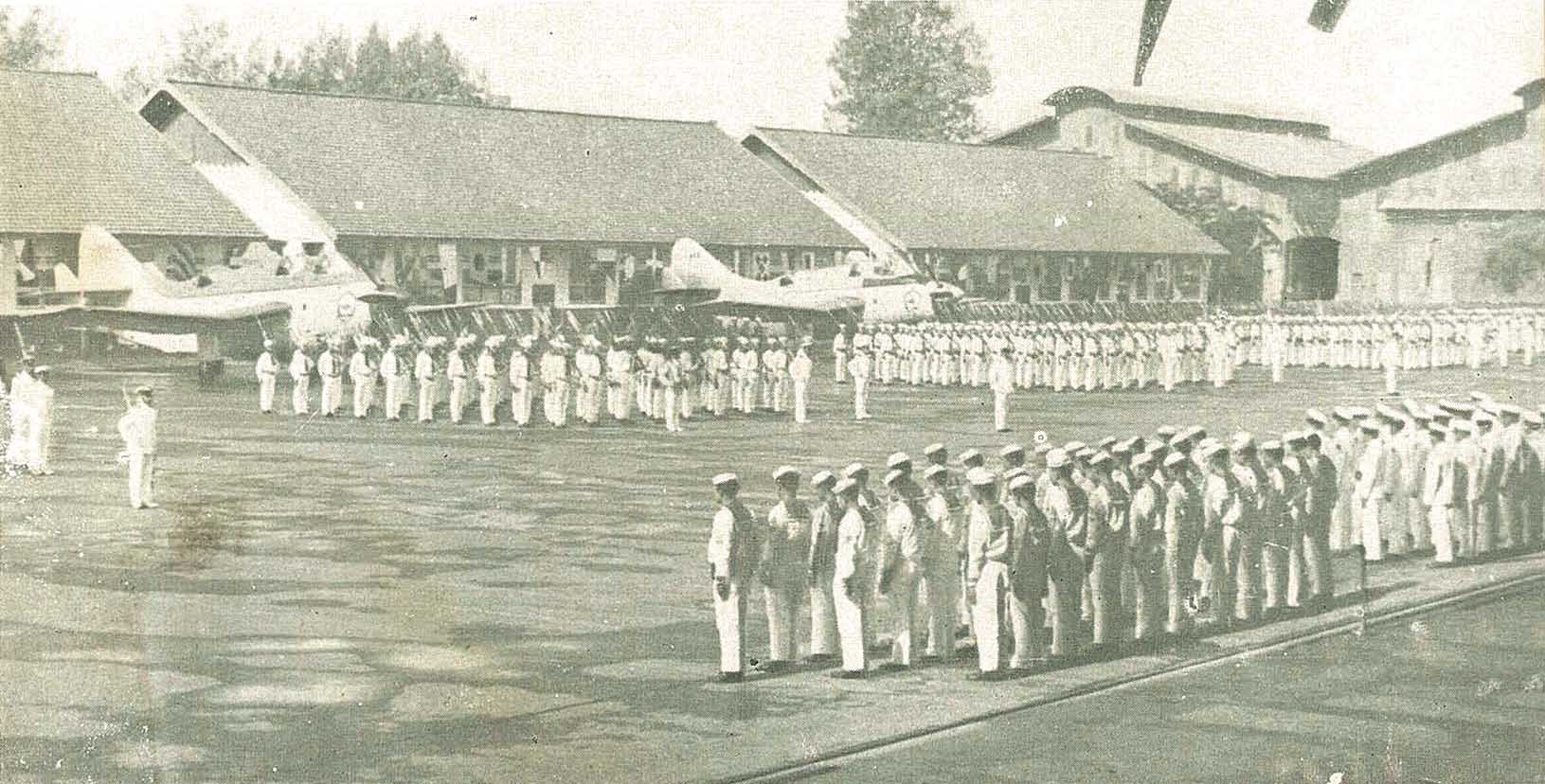
Indonesian Navy personnel during ceremony with Fairey Gannet in the background, c. 1950s

At the end of the Indonesian National Revolution in December 1949, the air base was handed over to the Indonesian Navy. As the main air base of the Indonesian Naval Aviation Command, it was the home base of the Indonesian Navy's Fairey Gannet ASW aircraft and Grumman HU-16 Albatross flying boats. In preparation for the upcoming Operation Trikora, the Navy felt that the length of the runways in Morokrembangan Naval Air Base were insufficient to operate future jet aircraft. A new naval air base was built to the southeast of Surabaya in Sidoarjo Regency. The new Juanda Naval Air Base was opened in 1964 and the naval aviation operation were gradually moved there. Morokrembangan air base was closed sometime later in the 1960s.

Nowadays, the site of former runways and hangars is located in the container terminal for the Tanjung Perak harbor, while the site of former seaplane hangars was located inside a naval base.
