= 91st Infantry Regiment (PA) =

Philippine military unit

- Active: June 1941 - May 1942
- Disbanded: April 9, 1942
- Countries: United States of America; Philippines
- Allegiance: United States of America; Philippines
- Branch: Army
- Type: Infantry
- Role: Reserve
- Size: 1,500
- Part of: 91st Infantry Division
- Garrison/HQ: Camp Tinio, Nueva Ecija
- Equipment: M1917 Enfield Rifles M1923 Thompson Submachineguns M1918 Browning Automatic Rifles M1918 Browning Light Machineguns M2 Browning Heavy Machineguns 3inch Stokes Mortar M1918 75mm Field Guns
- Engagements: Battle of Bataan

Commanders
- Notable commanders: Colonel James D. Carter, USA; Colonel Stuart MacDonald, USA

Insignia
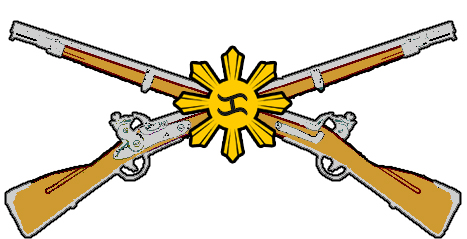
- Identification symbol

91st Infantry Regiment is a reserve unit of the Philippine Commonwealth Army during World War II. It was a part of 91st Infantry Division, based in Leyte but was transferred to Luzon to augment the defense there. It was held as a reserve force of USAFFE but participated in the Battle of Bataan.

== Organization ==
91st Infantry was activated in June 1941 on the island of Leyte in the Visayas Islands. Colonel Stuart MacDonald was its first commander, but upon arrival in Luzon he was selected as Chief of Staff of the newly established South Luzon Force (SLF) under Major General George S. Parker, USA. He was replaced by Lieutenant Colonel James Carter.

1st Battalion was under Captain Adriano Valdez, 2nd Battalion, and 3rd Battalion under Major Judson B. Crow, USA.

91st Division along with 91st, 92nd Infantry, and 91st Field Artillery was placed as reserve units of the Philippine Army and housed in Camp Tinio in Cabanatuan, Nueva Ecija.

=== Japanese Landing ===
91st Infantry Combat Team was sent to stop the Japanese forces in Pozorrubio, to reinforce the 26th Cavalry Regiment who has retreated after failing to stop the Japanese in La Union.

=== Bataan Campaign ===
91st Infantry Division was ordered to retreat towards Bataan Peninsula in January 1942. They were assigned to II Corps Area under Major General George S. Parker. 91st Infantry Regiment along with the entire division fought the Japanese onslaught, but was forced to retreat.

=== Surrender ===
General Edward P. King surrendered his battered, exhausted, and hungry troops in order to prevent annihilation on April 9, 1942. After five months of combat, the troops of combined US and Filipino forces suffered heavy losses and lack of ammunition.

The regiment was disbanded and never reactivated after the war. However, Philippine Army activated 91st Infantry (Sinagtala) Battalion deployed in Aurora Province in central Luzon under 7th Infantry Division.

== See also ==
- 91st Infantry Division (Philippines)
- 93rd Infantry Regiment
- Luther Stevens
