= John Wainwright =

John Wainwright may refer to:

- John Wainwright (author) (1921–1995), British crime novelist and author
- John L. Wainwright, Hampshire-born writer and historian
- John Wainwright (composer) (1723–1768), English composer
- John Wainwright (computer scientist)
- John Wainwright (soldier) (1839–1915), American Civil War soldier who received the Medal of Honor
- John Wainwright (Royal Navy officer)

== See also ==
- Jonathan Wainwright (disambiguation)
