= 47th Infantry Regiment (Imperial Japanese Army) =

Infantry regiment of the Imperial Japanese Army

- 歩兵第47連隊
- Active: 1896–1945
- Disbanded: September 12, 1945
- Country: Japanese Empire
- Branch: Imperial Japanese Army
- Type: Infantry
- Size: ~3,500 men (1941)
- Part of: 5th Division (1896–1902); 12th Division (1902–1925); 6th Division (1925–1940); 48th Division (1940–1945)
- Garrison/HQ: Kokura (1896–1925); Ōita (1925–1931); Shenyang (1931–1936); Ōita (1936–1936); Shenzhen (1939–1940); Guangdong (1940); Taihoku (1940–1943); Dili (1943–1945)
- Equipment: Type 92 battalion gun; Type 94 75 mm mountain gun; Type 94 37 mm anti-tank gun (until 1943); Type 1 47 mm anti-tank gun (post-1943)
- Engagements: Boxer Rebellion: Battle of Beicang; Battle of Yangcun; Battle of Tientsin; Battle of Peking; Russo-Japanese War: Battle of the Yalu River; Battle of Motien Pass; Battle of Liaoyang; Battle of Shaho; Battle of Sandepu; Battle of Mukden; Warlord Era (China): Jinan Incident; Manchuria Campaign: Battle of Harbin; Counterinsurgency campaign; Inner Mongolia Campaign; Second Sino-Japanese War: Beiping–Hankou Railway Operation; Battle of Shanghai; Battle of Nanking; Battle of Xuzhou; Battle of Wuhan; Battle of South Guangxi; World War II: Invasion of Lingayen Gulf; Battle of Java; Battle of Timor

Commanders
- Colonel of the Regiment: Yasue Tokuhiro (1943–1945)
- Notable commanders: Katsushige Watanabe (1896-1900); Tooru Sugihara (1903-1907); Fukuji Niiyama (1927-1929); Kanji Tsuneoka (1931-1934); Masanori Hasegawa (1937-1939); Isamu Yanagi (1940-1943)

The 47th Infantry Regiment was an infantry regiment in the Imperial Japanese Army, and was active during the Second Sino-Japanese War and the Pacific theatre of World War II. The unit was located in Kokura during until 1925, when it relocated to Ōita and was a part of the Kumamoto Divisional District, which was a component of the Western Army District of Japan. It drew recruits from Nagasaki, Ōita, Miyazaki, and Kagoshima prefectures. It was composed of three infantry battalions armed with machine guns and 70mm infantry guns, one signal company, a gun battalion armed with 75mm guns, and an anti-tank unit with 37mm guns, which would be superseded by 47mm guns in 1943.

== Combat History ==
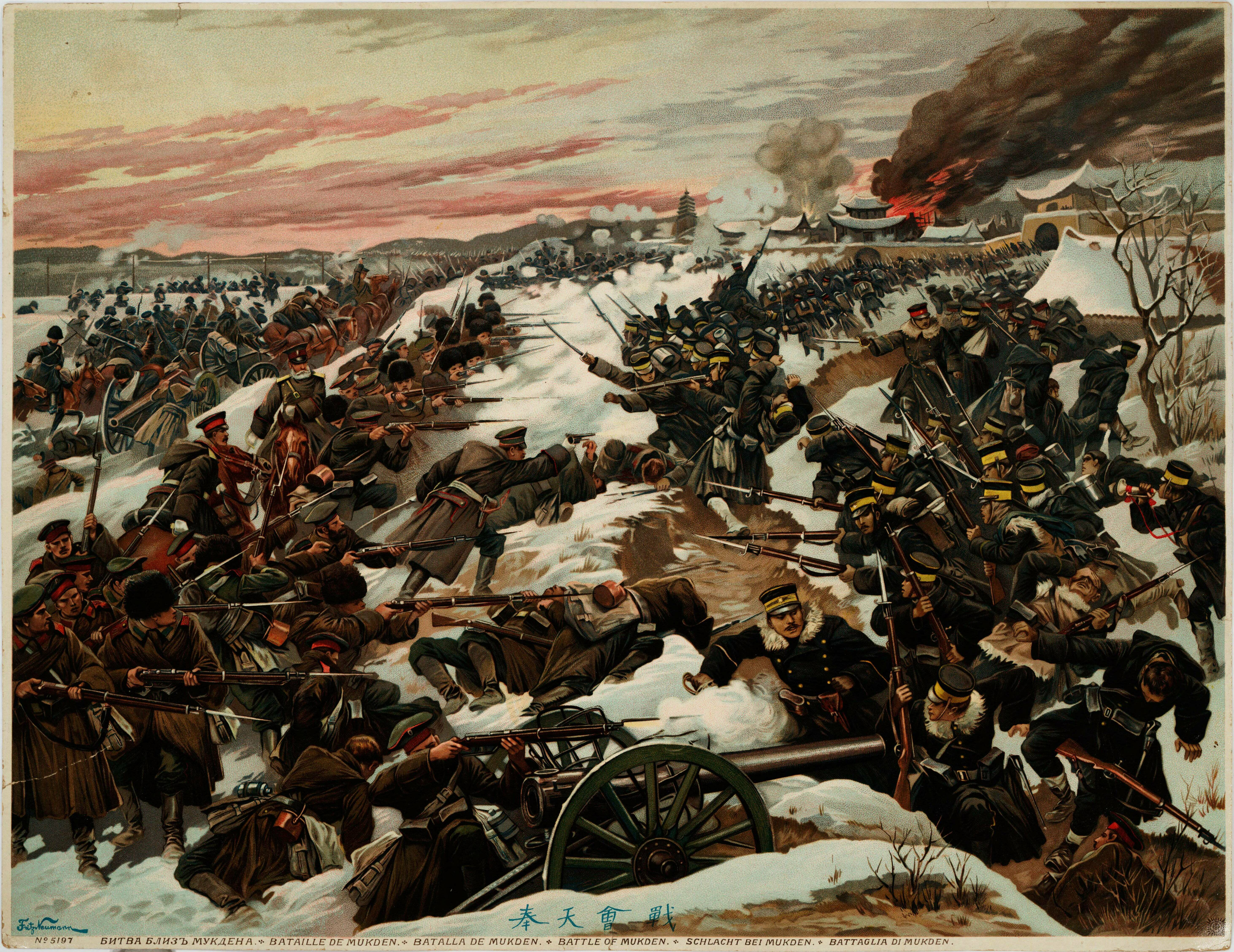
The Battle of Mukden, in which the regiment participated in

=== Meiji Era ===
The unit was formed in 1896 in Kokura as part of the 5th Division, received its colors in 1898, and was engaged in the Boxer Rebellion in 1900, where it participated in the Battle of Beicang, Yangcun, Second Battle of Tientsin and the Battle of Peking. It would be sent home after garrisoning in the Japanese Legation alongside the 21st Infantry Regiment. In 1902, the unit was organized as part of the 12th Division of the First Army, and would be sent to Korea in February 1904 to engage Russian forces in the Russo-Japanese War, being one of the first units to land in Korea. The unit would advance up to the Yalu River, battling the Russians, and continued to fight them at Motien Pass, Liaoyang, Shaho, Sandepu, and concluded their campaign with the Battle of Mukden in February 1905. It also saw combat against the Honghuzi, where they cleared their presence out of what is now Liaoning Province.

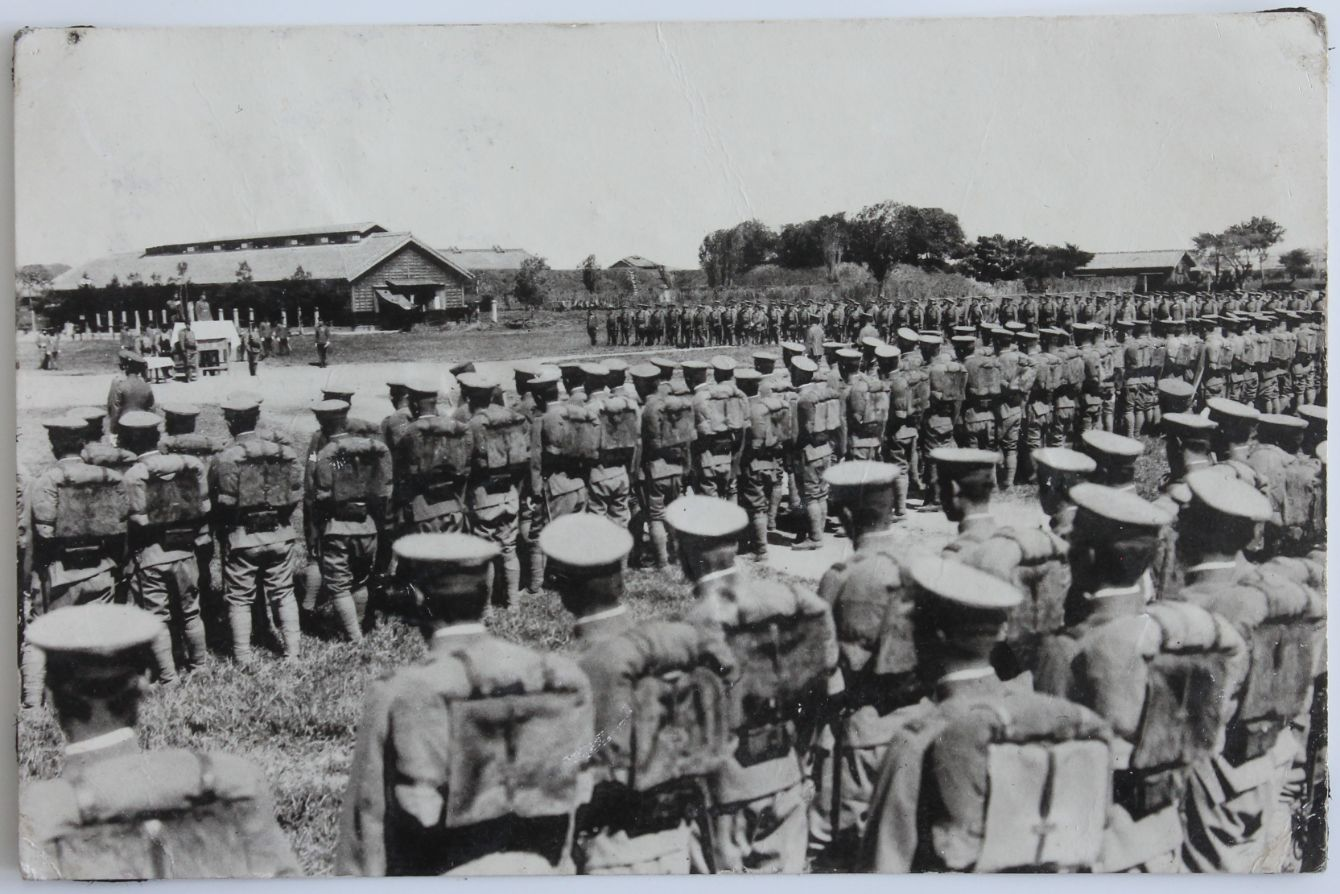
The 47th Infantry Regiment in the Philippines during World War II

=== Taishō Era ===
In 1914, the unit prepared for the First World War, but was ultimately denied any action in the Siege of Tsingtao and subsequent actions in the war. In August 1918, the regiment participated in the Siberian Intervention, disembarking at Vladivostok and fighting against communist forces. They were part of the units that rescued the Czechoslovak Legion at Lake Baikal, and occupied much of Manchuria and parts of southern Russia until they were recalled in 1922. The 3rd Battalion stayed behind, however, in order to quell the Rice Riots in 1918. In 1925, the 72nd Infantry Regiment was dismantled due to disarmament agreements as part of the Washington Naval Treaty and other treaties. As such, they relocated to Ōita that same year and joined the 6th Division.

=== Shōwa Era ===
In 1928, they moved to Tsingtao in order to support the Beiyang government and halt the movement of the Kuomintang under Chiang Kai-shek. The unit saw combat against the National Revolutionary Army alongside the National Pacification Army, and was noted to have performed well under fire. Ultimately, the unit was withdrawn and sent back to Japan after the situation was de-escalated. In 1931, the unit took part in the invasion of Manchuria and arrived in Shenyang in December 1931. It was subsequently involved in the Battle of Harbin, where it would break through Chinese resistance and force the NRA to retreat. In 1933, after taking part in the Manchuria Operation and the counterinsurgency campaign, the unit took part in the Inner Mongolia operations.

==== Participation in the Second Sino-Japanese War ====
The unit would be immediately sent to the Beijing area after the Marco Polo Bridge incident, and then see action in the Beiping–Hankou Railway Operation in 1937 once war broke out with China. After the Japanese victory in the operation, the unit would become part of the 10th Army and began to attack Chinese troops in Shandong province starting in October 1937. However, by November it would, along with the rest of the parent division, head to the city of Shanghai. The unit landed in Shanghai on November 5 and took part in the fighting in Jinshanwei, then advancing west along the Yangtze River. It would break through the Wufu line November and attack the city of Nanking; the unit would eventually enter the city in December and was one of the main regiments that participated in the Rape of Nanking. Starting in 1938, the regiment would be attached to the Central China Expeditionary Force and participate in the Battle of Xuzhou; later, it would see action in the Battle of Wuhan before returning to Japan in late 1939. Soon, however, the regiment was transferred to garrison in Shenzhen in January 1940 and would soon become a part of the 48th Brigade, a component of the short lived 22nd Army. It would participate in the Southern Guangxi offensive and was responsible for fighting Chinese forces east of Nanning. However, the unit would withdraw in November 1940 and return to garrison in Shenzhen and, later, Canton.

==== Participation in the Second World War ====
The unit would become a part of the new 48th Division in November 1940 and would garrison in Guangdong, then in Taihoku, Formosa, until December 1941, where it would be transferred to Kaohsiung to arm for the Invasion of the Philippines. It shipped out from Kaohsiung on December 18, where it would land outside of Agoo as part of the Invasion of Lingayen Gulf on December 22, 1941. It would see action against the 26th Philippine Cavalry on December 24, 1941, at Binalonan, where it would assist the 4th Atmored Regiment and two regiments of Formosa infantry to repel the defenders. Eventually, the unit would enter Manila in January 1942 and garrison in the province of Cavite, with troops stationed in the towns of Silang and Tagaytay. However, it would soon move out along with the rest of the 48th Division in the Invasion of Java. The 47th would land on the eastern side of the island and move towards Surabaya along the coast as part of the Abe Unit under the command of Major-General Koichi Abe. The unit faced resistance from the British 3rd Hussars and scattered Dutch units and, after battling the Allied Forces in Surabaya, would capture the city. It would then garrison the island for a few months before being transferred to East Timor to mop up Australian and Dutch commandos, where it would stay for the rest of the war. The unit was disbanded in September 1945.
