= 92nd Infantry Regiment (PA) =

- Active: September 1941 - May 1942
- Disbanded: April 9, 1942
- Countries: United States of America; Philippines
- Allegiance: United States Army
- Branch: Army
- Type: Infantry
- Role: Reserve
- Size: 1,500
- Part of: 91st Infantry Division
- Garrison/HQ: Camp Lukban, Samar
- Equipment: M1917 Enfield Rifles M1923 Thompson Submachineguns; M1918 Browning Automatic Rifles; M1917 Browning Machineguns; M2 Browning Heavy Machineguns 3inch Stokes Mortar

Commanders
- Notable commanders: Colonel John H. Rodman, USA

Insignia
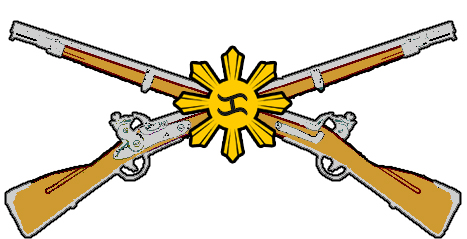
- Identification symbol

92nd Infantry Regiment is a reserve unit of Philippine Commonwealth Army activated and organized in September 1941. It was part of 91st Division under Brigadier General Luther Stevens. They fought in Battle of Bataan and surrendered in April 1942 when Luzon Force commander Major General Edward P. King Jr., surrendered all his troops.

== Organization ==
The regiment was organized from reserve soldiers from Samar and Leyte islands. It was commanded by Lieutenant Colonel John H. Rodman and was ordered to transfer to main island of Luzon to augment the defense in October of that year. The regiment along with other units of 91st Division was moved to Camp Tinio in Cabanatuan, Nueva Ecija for further training upon arrival. The regiment encountered same problems are other units during that time. Defective M1917 Enfield rifles, lack of ammunition for training, communication between American officers speaking in English, junior officers majority from Luzon speaks Tagalog while enlisted used their local dialect.

=== Combat ===
Initially the 91st Division was held in reserve but was forced to engaged Japanese in Pangasinan not as one unit. 91st Infantry was sent to Pozorrubio reinforced 71st Division in preventing Japanese reaching Baguio and 92nd Infantry was held in Rosales to support 21st Division in preventing Japanese into Tarlac. However, both was not successful although it delayed the Japanese move south towards Manila.

=== Retreat to Bataan ===
Further defensive campaigns did not stop Japanese advance and War Plan Orange 3 was put into effect, all units to retreat to Bataan Peninsula. 91st Division along with its units reached Bataan on January 4, 1942, and again was assigned as reserve force and later was assigned to II Corps under Major General George S. Parker. Bulk of Japanese advanced was towards II Corps Area. 92nd Infantry was put forward and claimed heavy losses and casualties.

=== Surrender ===
On April 9, 1942, the unit surrendered upon orders of General King to prevent further bloodshed as his forces are hungry and sick with lack of ammunition, food, and medicines.

== Notable soldiers ==
- Manuel Yan - Future AFP Chief of Staff and Ambassador. The longest serving public servant of the Philippines.
