= 81st Infantry Regiment (PA) =

- Active: August 26, 1941 – May 10, 1942
- Disbanded: May 11, 1942
- Countries: United States of America; Philippines
- Allegiance: United States Army
- Branch: Army
- Type: Infantry
- Role: Territorial Army
- Size: 1,800
- Part of: Agusan Sector Samar Brigade 81st Infantry Division
- Garrison/HQ: Sugod, Leyte; Camp Kalaw, Monkayo, Davao
- Equipment: M1917 Enfield .30 caliber bolt-action rifles M1918 Browning .30 caliber automatic rifles M1923 Thompson .45 ACP submachine guns M1917 Browning .30 caliber machine guns M2 Browning .50 caliber heavy machine guns 3-inch Stokes mortar
- Engagements: Battle of Butuan Battle of Monkayo Battle of Mawab

Commanders
- Senior Military Instructor: Lieutenant Colonel William Van Norstrand, USA; Lieutenant Colonel Arden Boellner, USA; Lieutenant Colonel Ben-Hur Chastaine
- Notable commanders: Lieutenant Colonel Ruperto Kangleon, PA

Insignia
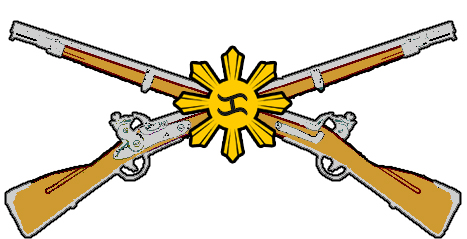
- Identification symbol

81st Infantry Regiment is a military unit and formation of the Philippine Commonwealth Army

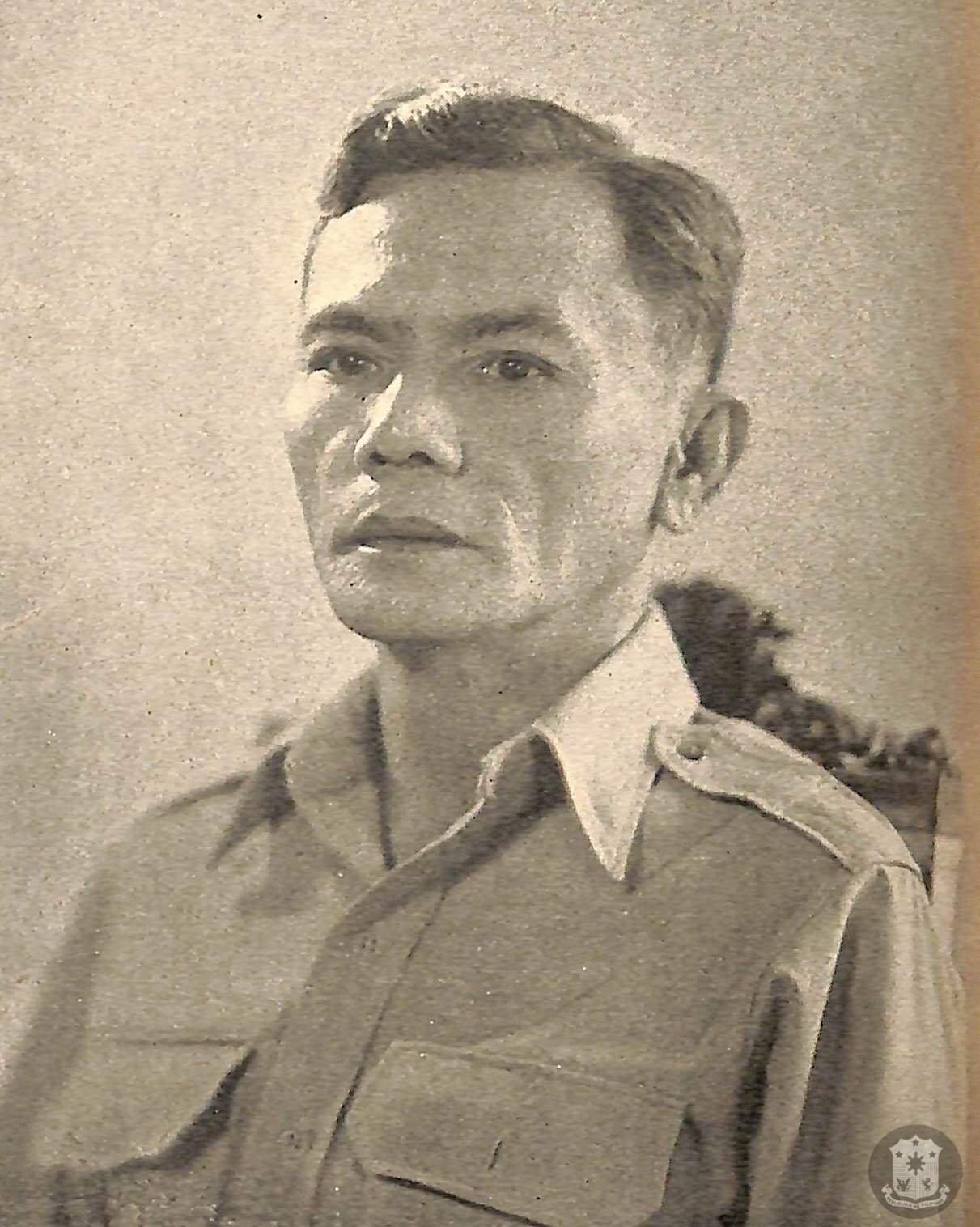
Lieutenant Colonel Ruperto Kangleon was the first commander of the regiment.

activated in August 1941 and fought in Mindanao during early stage of World War II. It was put under the command of 81st Infantry Division based in Cebu but was transferred to Leyte when 91st Infantry Division was ordered transferred to Luzon. Together with 93rd Infantry Regiment and Leyte Provisional Regiment, they formed the Samar-Leyte Brigade under Colonel Ben-Hur Chastaine.

== Background ==
The regiment was formed in Cebu with recruits mostly from Cebu and Bohol islands. It was brought to Tubigon, Bohol for training and cross to Leyte island. It was initially under the command of Lieutenant Colonel Ruperto Kangleon, who is a graduate of PC Academy in 1914. In December when hostilities started Lieutenant Colonel Arden Boellner arrived became its senior military instructor. The regiment was issued with M1917 Enfield .30 caliber bolt-action rifles with same issue with other regiments, encountering broken extractors and pins. Lack of ammunition that the soldiers of the regiment was not allowed to fire their rifles during training.

Regimental staffs are S1, S2 - Captain Marcos Soliman, S3, S4, Signal Officer, Quartermaster, JAG. Captain Soliman would be known as a guerilla leader and Director of NICA years after the war.

Battalion commanders were 1st Battalion, Captain Luis Dator, 2nd Battalion under Captain Segundo Velasco, and 3rd Battalion under Captain Tiburcio Bancaras upon its activation.

By January 1942, In Agusan sector 1st Battalion is now under Captain John S. Miner, 2nd Battalion under 1Lt. Perfecto Mabugat, and 3rd Battalion is now under Major Joseph Stensland.

== Deployments to Samar and transfer to Mindanao ==
=== Samar ===
When 91st Infantry Division under Brigadier General Luther R. Stevens was ordered to transfer to Luzon Island on September 1, 1941, only its last regiment the 93rd Infantry was left in Leyte as it is still being activated and organized from the reservist. USAFFE decided to transfer to 81st Infantry Regiment to bolster its defense. Together with 93rd Infantry Regiment they, comprised the Samar Brigade. Training was continuous when World War II started on December 8, 1941.

=== Mindanao ===
In January 1942, it received an order from General Sharp the Visayas-Mindanao Force commander to transferred the Samar Brigade to Mindanao via Surigao. Along with 93rd Infantry Regiment and Provincial Battalions of Surigao and Agusan they were tasked to defend the Agusan Sector, which included coasts of Agusan, Surigao, and Northern Davao Provinces. The brigade commander Colonel Ben-Hur Chastaine also served as sector commander with its headquarters at Anakan Lumber Co., Compound near Ginoog, Misamis Oriental.

The regiment was resorted to guarding the coastline, gathering supplies, and retrieving supplies and mines dump by supply ships from Australia. On February 20, 1942, 93rd Infantry Regiment was ordered to transfer to Bukidnon to be the Force reserve, leaving only 81st Infantry Regiment defending entire Agusan sector. Back on January 13, 1942, to prevent Japanese infiltrating northward from Davao City, Colonel Chastain ordered 1st Battalion, 81st Infantry to moved to Monkayo, Davao sharing a headquarters with PC in Camp Kalao. 2nd Battalion was ordered to reinforce 1st Battalion, leaving 3rd Battalion along with PC units to defend Butuan City.

=== Davao Front ===
The men of 1st Battalion were very effective in preventing the Japanese moving northward and contain them with Davao Province and not reaching Agusan Valley. In February 5, it was decided to move the entire 81st Infantry Regiment (Less 3rd Battalion) in Agusan-Davao front. Anticipating offensive against the Japanese in Davao City. 2nd Battalion went first, then HQ & HQ battalion, then Colonel Boellner and his staff. In March, 2nd Battalion relieved 1st Battalion in putting pressure to the Japanese forces in Davao. Towards the end of March Lieutenant Colonel Boellner was transferred to Cagayan sector. Lieutenant Colonel William Van Nostrand, who came from Lanao sector with 61st Infantry, arrived and replaced him as regimental commander.

=== Butuan Front ===
But on April 26, 1942, Japanese detachment landed in Butuan creating another front for Agusan sector. 3rd Battalion and Butuan Provisional Battalion.

=== Surrender ===
On May 10, 1942, the regiment was still fighting in two fronts Davao and Butuan when order from Mindanao Force headquarters to surrender the following day. Colonel Kangleon surrendered as ordered by Colonel Chastaine and was incarcerated in Camp Kellogg before being moved to a boat in Butuan port. Most of the American soldiers were sent to Davao Penal Colony. Kangleon was able to escape and took a launch and crossed back to Leyte, where he established his guerilla forces.

== See also ==
- 81st Division (Philippines)
- Mindanao Force
- Ruperto Kangleon
