= Juanda International Airport =

International airport serving Surabaya, East Java, Indonesia

Juanda International Airport Bandar Udara Internasional Juanda

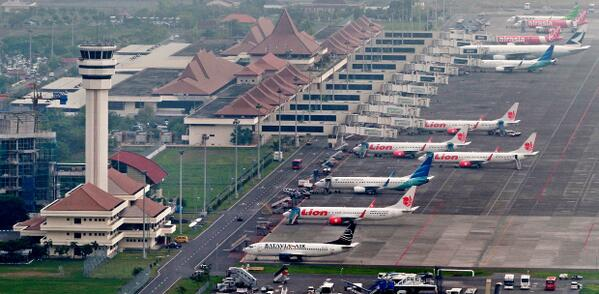
- IATA: SUB; ICAO: WARR; WMO: 96935

Summary
- Airport type: Public / Military
- Owner: Indonesian Navy
- Operator: InJourney Airports
- Serves: Surabaya metropolitan area
- Location: Sedati, Sidoarjo Regency, Indonesia
- Opened: 7 February 1964; 62 years ago
- Hub for: Batik Air; Garuda Indonesia
- Operating base for: Citilink; Indonesia AirAsia; Lion Air; Super Air Jet
- Time zone: WIB (UTC+07:00)
- Elevation AMSL: 3 m (9.8 ft)
- Coordinates: 07°22′47″S 112°47′13″E
- Website: www.juanda-airport.com

Maps
- Java region in Indonesia

- Location of airport in East Java / Indonesia SUB/WARR (Java) SUB/WARR (Indonesia) SUB/WARR (Southeast Asia)

Runways
Direction	Length		Surface
Direction	m	ft	Surface
10/28	3,000	9,843	Asphalt

Statistics (2024)
- Passengers: 14,033,162 (▲0.2%)
- Cargo (tonnes): 81,414 (▲20.6%)
- Aircraft movements: 94,746 (▼1.6%)
- Source: DGCA

Juanda International Airport (IATA: SUB, ICAO: WARR) is a joint-use international airport serving Surabaya, East Java, Indonesia. It is located in Sedati District, Sidoarjo. Currently, it is the third busiest airport in Indonesia (after Jakarta's Soekarno–Hatta and Denpasar's Ngurah Rai). It is located approximately 12 kilometres (7.5 miles) from Surabaya city centre and serves the Surabaya metropolitan area, the metropolitan area of Surabaya plus extended urban area. Juanda International Airport is currently operated by InJourney Airports, formerly Angkasa Pura I. The airport takes its name after Djuanda Kartawidjaja (1911–1963), the last Prime Minister of Indonesia who had proposed development of the airport. In 2019, the airport served about 500 aircraft per day.

Currently, Juanda International Airport is the hub of Batik Air and Citilink, focus city of Garuda Indonesia, and the operating base of Lion Air and Super Air Jet along with Jakarta's Soekarno–Hatta International Airport. Juanda International Airport will become one of the main airports in Indonesia for ASEAN Open skies.

While the commercial operations of the airport are managed by InJourney Airports, the land remains fully owned by the Indonesian Navy, with the passenger terminal functioning as a civil enclave. The airport shares its facilities with Naval Air Station Juanda, a major Class A installation and the headquarters of the Indonesian Navy’s Naval Aviation Center (Puspenerbal). In addition, the airport also accommodates Muljono Air Force Base, a Type B facility operated by the Indonesian Air Force.

== History ==
=== Background ===
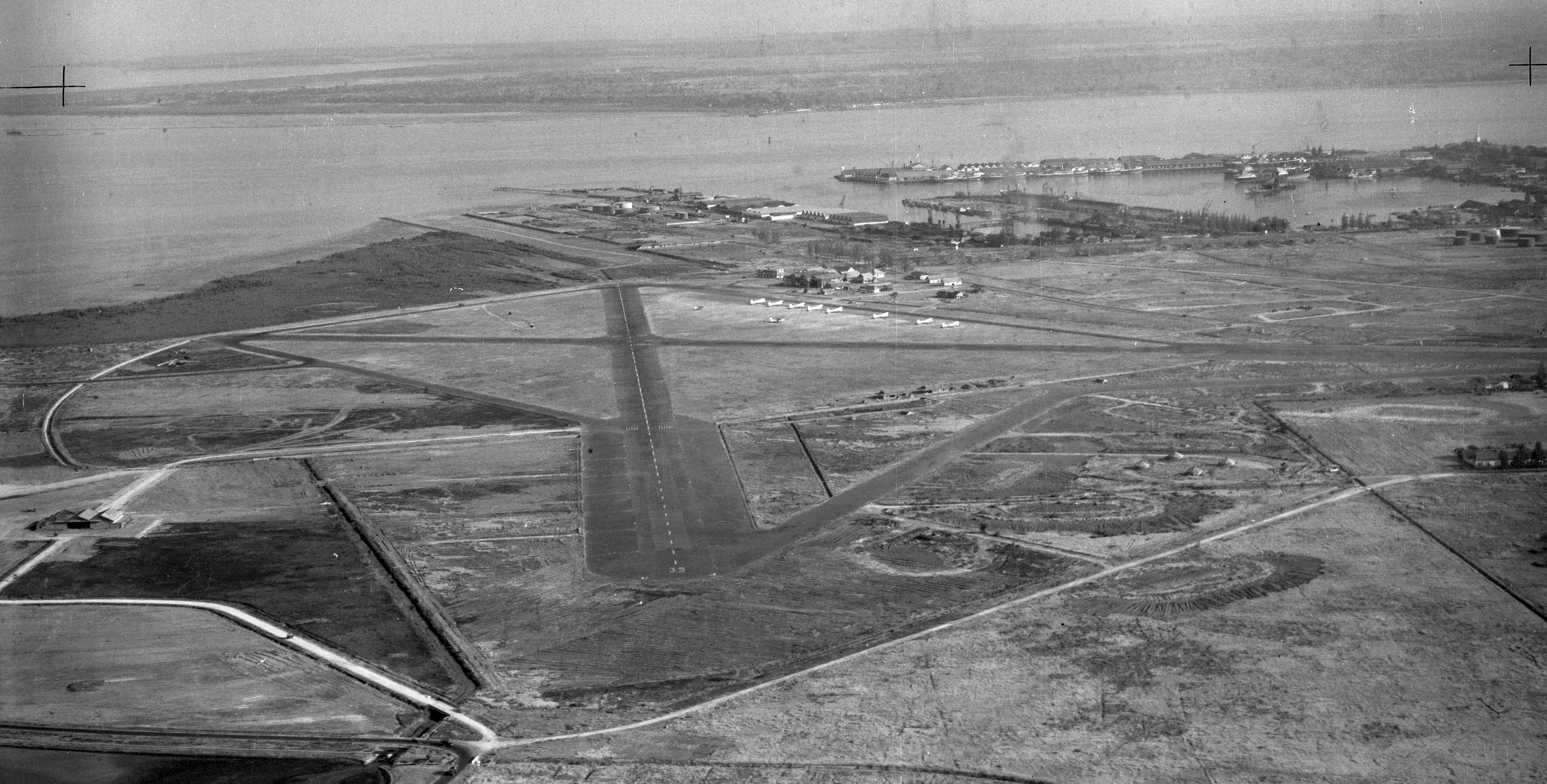
Aerial view of Morokrembangan Naval Air Base, the former principal airport of Surabaya prior to the opening of Juanda International Airport

The first airport in Surabaya was located in the present-day Darmo area. Darmo Airfield began construction in the early 1920s as part of broader efforts to modernize air transport in the Dutch East Indies. Historical records from colonial civil aviation archives indicate that the airfield was operated by the Koninklijke Nederlandsch Indische Luchtvaart Maatschappij (KNILM) and served as Surabaya’s primary civil aviation hub prior to the Second World War. By the late 1920s, the facility had begun handling intercity routes within Java. Archival documentation compiled by the National Archives of Indonesia (ANRI) also records that Darmo Airfield received international flights. A notable example was the stopover of a KLM Douglas DC-2 aircraft on 10 November 1934, during a long-distance flight from Brisbane, Australia, to London, United Kingdom. As military requirements increased and additional airfields were developed in Surabaya, including Morokrembangan Airfield, aviation activity at Darmo gradually declined. By the early 1940s, it was no longer actively used for civil aviation. Historical urban planning records further note that the former site of Darmo Airfield has since been repurposed and now forms part of the Indonesian Army’s Kodam V/Brawijaya Military Regional Command complex.

Before the opening of Juanda Airport, the Indonesian Navy's Naval Aviation Center was based at Morokrembangan Naval Air Base, located near the Port of Tanjung Perak in Surabaya. This base, built in 1922 during the Dutch colonial era, had previously served as a facility for the Netherlands Naval Aviation Service (Marineluchtvaartdienst) of the Royal Netherlands Navy. Following the closure of Darmo Airfield, Morokrembangan expanded beyond its military role to also accommodate passenger flights, becoming Surabaya’s main commercial airport. However, as air traffic increased, Morokrembangan became increasingly congested. The base could not be expanded due to its limited land area and its proximity to the city, which hindered further development.

In the early 1960s, as Operation Trikora was being planned—a military campaign to reclaim Western New Guinea from Dutch control—the Indonesian Navy recognized the need for a new airbase to support the operation and house its aircraft. In response, the Indonesian government approved the construction of the airbase near Surabaya, East Java. Several sites were considered, including Gresik, Raci (Pasuruan), and Sedati (Sidoarjo). After conducting a site survey, Sedati was selected due to its proximity to Surabaya and its expansive, flat terrain, which was ideal for building a large-scale airbase with room for future expansion.

=== Construction ===
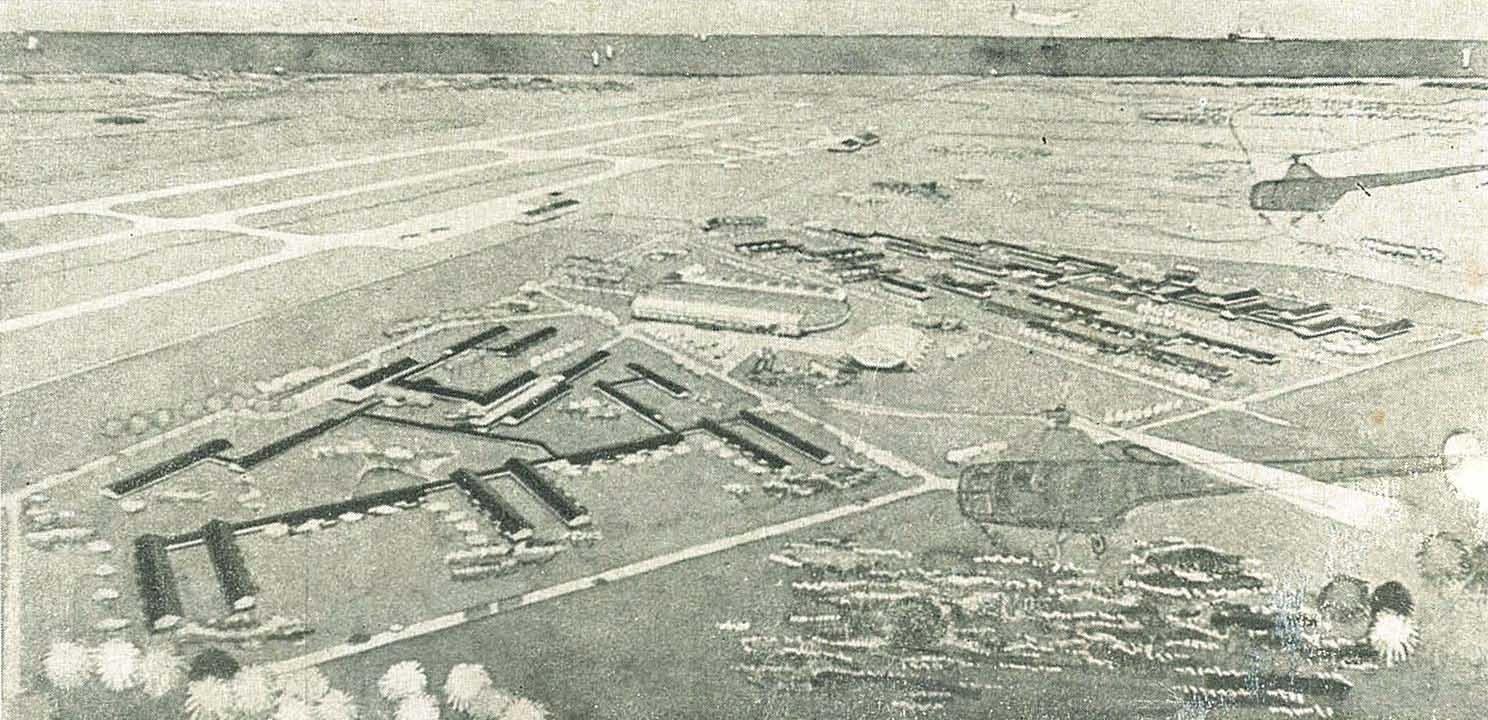
Naval Air Base Waru while it was still under construction, 1960

The construction of the airbase, known as Project Waru, was Indonesia's first airfield development since independence. Prior to this, existing airbases were inherited from the Dutch colonial era and had only been repaired or upgraded. The project was managed by the Waru Project Supervisory Team (TPPW), representing the Indonesian government, and two French companies: Compagnie d'Ingénieurs et Techniciens (CITE) as the consultant and Société de Construction des Batignolles as the contractor. Under the terms of the contract, the project was to be completed in four years, from 1960 to 1964.

To accommodate the construction of a major airbase with a runway measuring 3,000 meters by 45 meters, the Indonesian government acquired about 2,400 hectares of land. This land included a mix of dry land, rice fields, and swampland. A massive volume of construction materials was required, particularly sand and stone. Sand was sourced from the Porong River, while stone was quarried from Mount Pandaan and transported to Waru by hundreds of project trucks. The estimated total volume of materials was around 11.2 million cubic meters, or 1.8 million tons. With project activities carried out around the clock and supported through close coordination among various stakeholders—the Surabaya City Government, the Surabaya Military Command, the Port Authority, and the wider community—the project was ultimately completed ahead of schedule. On 22 September 1963, the runway was declared operational, marking the completion of the project a full seven months ahead of plan. The following day, a flight of four Fairey Gannet aircraft from the Indonesian Navy conducted the first official landing at the still under construction airbase.

During the construction, the project faced a financial crisis. At one point, Batignolles, the contractor, threatened to withdraw from the project, escalating the issue to President Sukarno. In response, Sukarno issued a mandate to Djoeanda Kartawidjaja, who was serving as Prime Minister during the Guided Democracy era. Djoeanda was tasked with resolving the financial crisis and ensuring the successful completion of the project. Djoeanda arrived at the Waru airbase on 15 October 1963 aboard a Convair 990 to oversee the project's continuation. His efforts were instrumental in the completion of the project, and in recognition of his contribution, the airbase was named “Juanda” shortly after his death on 7 November 1963. The Juanda Airbase was officially inaugurated by President Sukarno on 12 August 1964.

=== Operation of civilian flights ===
As development progressed, a key issue emerged: Garuda Indonesia sought to relocate its aircraft operations—such as the Convair 240, Convair 340, and Convair 440—from the inadequate Morokrembangan Airport to Juanda Airport. However, since Juanda had not originally been designed for civil aviation, it lacked the necessary facilities to accommodate commercial flights. As Garuda’s operational needs became increasingly urgent, an initiative was launched to repurpose the former Batignolles warehouse into a temporary passenger terminal. This adaptation enabled the gradual transfer of operations, and ultimately marked the relocation of Surabaya’s commercial airport functions to Juanda, and Morokrembangan Airport was eventually closed sometime later in the 1960s. On 7 December 1981, the Directorate General of Civil Aviation of the Ministry of Transportation took over the management of the airport. Then, on 1 January 1985, the management of the commercial airport was transferred to Perum Angkasa Pura I, later known simply as Angkasa Pura I, and currently referred to as InJourney Airport.

As civilian flight traffic increased, the need for a dedicated terminal for domestic and international flights became apparent. As a result, a new terminal was constructed to accommodate the growing demand. On 24 December 1990, Juanda Airport was officially designated as an international airport with the opening of its international terminal. Since December 1987, the airport had already been serving flights to destinations such as Singapore, Kuala Lumpur, Hong Kong, Taipei, and Manila. KLM began operating flights to Surabaya in April 1996, offering service to Amsterdam via Singapore on Boeing 747s. However, the route was discontinued in February 1997.

Since its opening, the Indonesian government also floated the idea of transferring full usage rights of the base to civilian control, arguing that airport operating costs would place an additional burden on the defense and security budget. However, this proposal was rejected by the Indonesian Navy.

To accommodate the growing number of passengers and increasing air traffic, a new terminal covering an area of 51,500 square meters was inaugurated on 7 November 2006. The facility was initially designed to handle between 6 and 8 million passengers annually. On 14 February 2014, another new terminal began operations on the southern side of the airport, across the runway, at the site of the former terminal which had been demolished. Covering an area of 50,000 square meters, the new facility has a capacity to handle up to 6.5 million passengers annually. It was subsequently designated as Terminal 2, while the existing terminal is to be known as Terminal 1.

In 2014, Juanda International Airport was the world's tenth best in Airport Service Quality by Airport Council International among 79 airports with passengers capacity between 5 and 15 million a year. In Q1 2015, the airport was the world's seventh best in Airport Service Quality by ACI.

== Facilities and development ==
=== Terminals ===
==== Terminal 1 ====
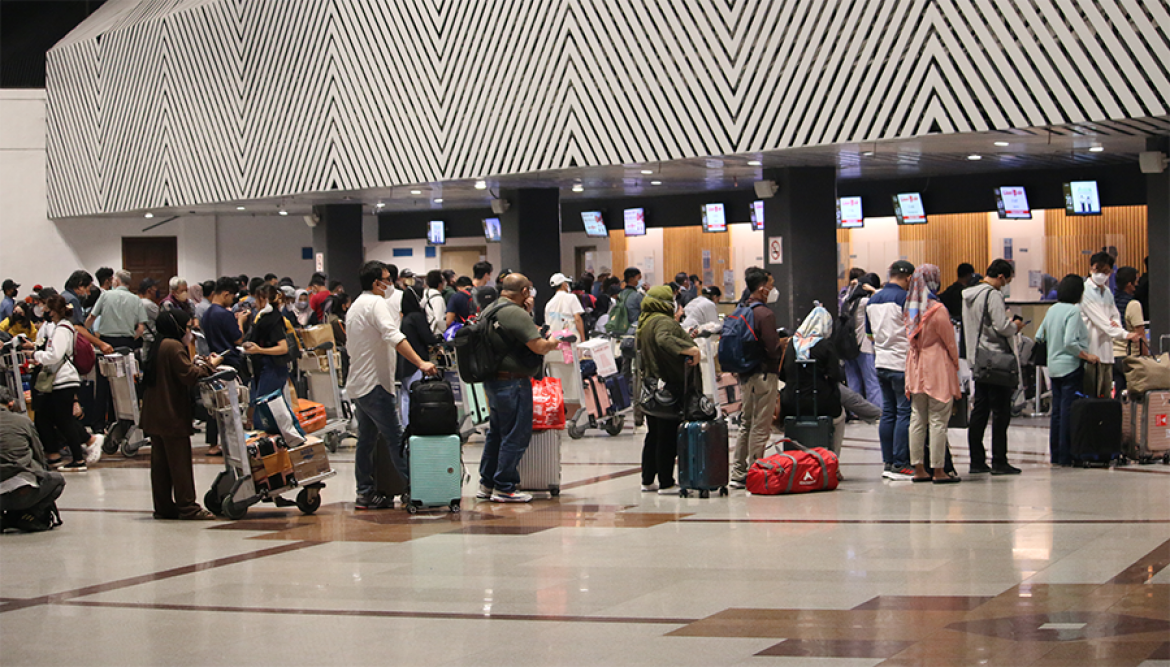
Terminal 1 check-in area

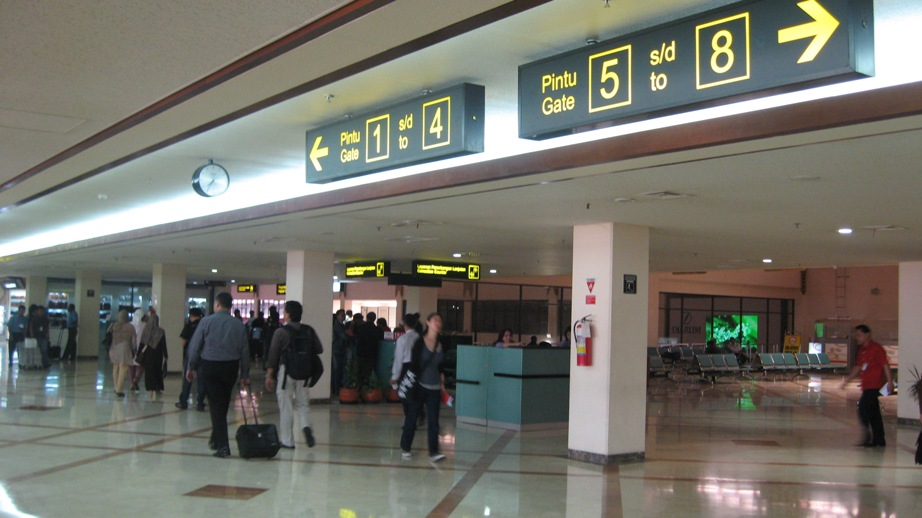
Terminal 1 boarding gates

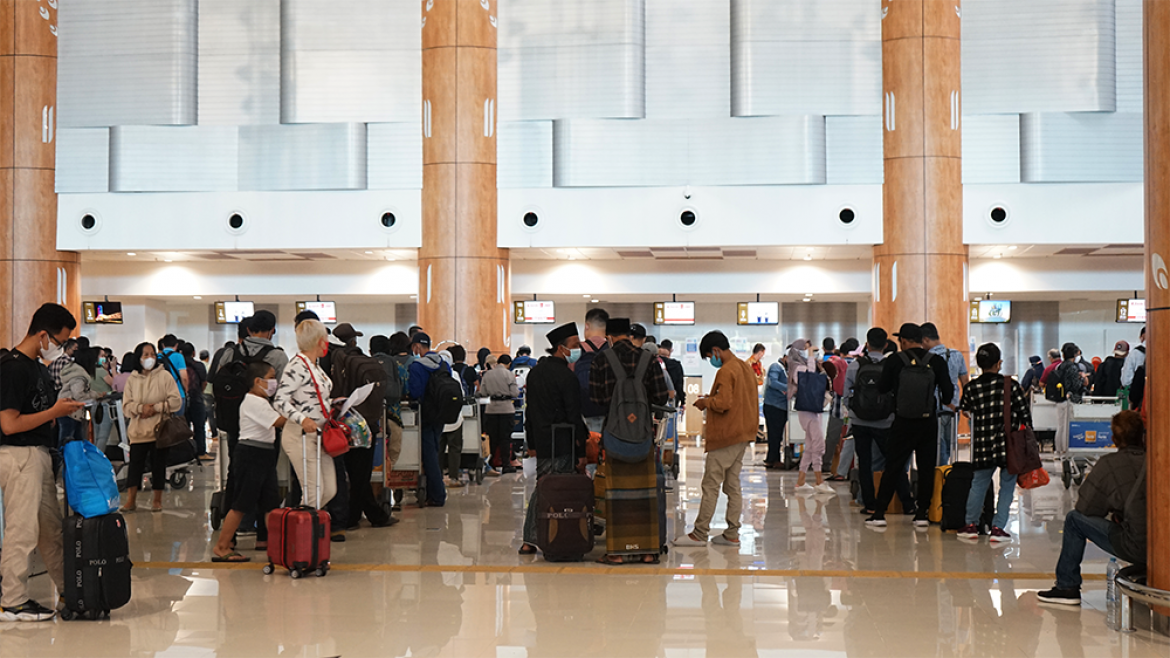
Terminal 2 check-in area

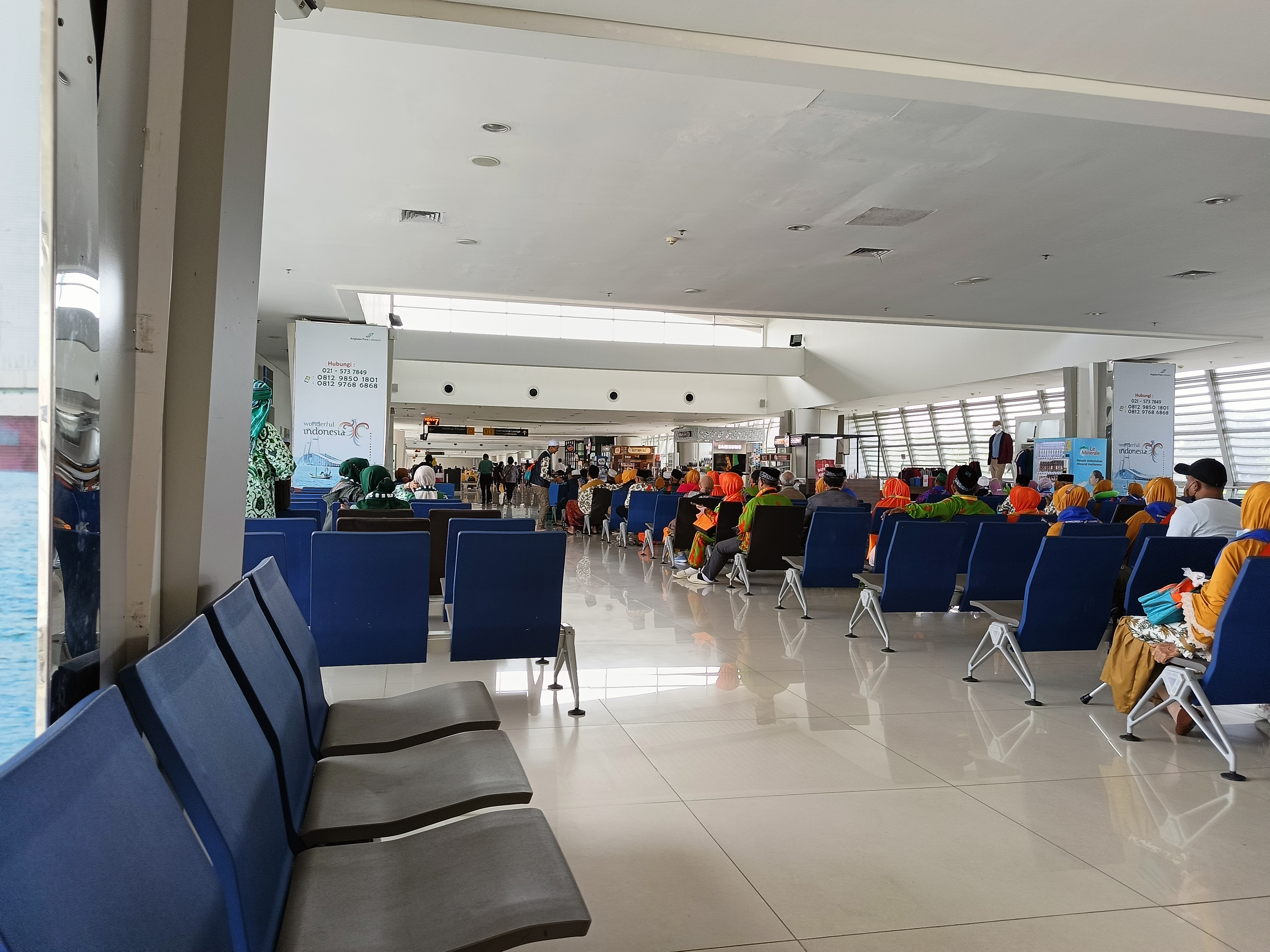
Terminal 2 boarding gates

Terminal 1 was officially inaugurated on 7 November 2006 as part of a broader effort to accommodate the growing number of air passengers at Juanda International Airport. The development of the terminal infrastructure required an investment of approximately Rp 1.2 trillion. Funding for the project was sourced in part from a ¥23.2 billion loan provided by the Japan Bank for International Cooperation (JBIC), supplemented by Rp. 236.4 billion from the Indonesian state budget (APBN). The terminal spans 51,500 square meters and is built across three floors. It is equipped with 11 jet bridges to facilitate passenger boarding and disembarkation. The architectural design of Terminal 1 incorporates traditional elements from Sumbanese high-hat roofs, blended with Javanese-Malay architectural styles, reflecting local cultural influences. Terminal 1 exclusively serves all domestic flights operating at Juanda Airport. The terminal is divided into two sub-terminals: Terminal 1A, which handles departures, and Terminal 1B, which is designated for arrivals. To improve access and connectivity, Terminal 1 is directly linked to the Waru–Juanda Toll Road, which commenced operations in 2008 and provides a more efficient route between the airport and Surabaya as well as surrounding areas.

A major expansion of Terminal 1 was completed in October 2021, increasing its annual passenger capacity to 8.7 million. The terminal's total area was expanded to 91,700 square meters, with commercial space growing from 6,250 m^{2} to 7,680 m^{2}. The waiting area was also enlarged to 19,940 m^{2} from the previous 16,340 m^{2} to enhance passenger comfort. Two children's play areas were added to better serve family travelers. The expansion included upgrades to passenger circulation infrastructure, with the number of escalators increased from six to eight, elevators from six to 16, and travelators from six to 19. The number of departure gates was also raised from 12 to 14, improving the terminal's overall operational efficiency.

==== Terminal 2 ====
Terminal 2 was constructed on the site of the former terminal building, which was demolished to make way for the new facility. Located to the south of Terminal 1 and across the runway, Terminal 2 officially opened on 14 February 2014. The project was completed at a cost of approximately Rp 900 billion. In contrast to Terminal 1, which incorporates traditional Indonesian architectural elements, Terminal 2 features a sleek, modern design. Covering a total area of 49,500 square meters (533,000 square feet) over three floors, the terminal is equipped with eight aerobridges and is capable of handling up to six million passengers annually.

Terminal 2 houses 40 check-in counters with baggage handling facilities and an additional nine counters for passengers without checked baggage, as well as a security checkpoint. Approximately 20 percent of the terminal's area—about 9,787.65 square meters—is allocated for commercial purposes, including space for retail tenants, airline offices, and ticketing counters. The terminal's apron can accommodate up to 17 aircraft, serving both domestic and international flights. A designated vehicle parking area is available for passenger pick-up and can hold up to 5,000 vehicles.

Terminal 2 currently handles all international flights. Initially, some domestic flights operated from Terminal 2, including those by Garuda Indonesia, Indonesia AirAsia, and Pelita Air. However, in 2023, these airlines were moved to Terminal 1.

==== Cargo terminal ====
A new cargo terminal began operations on 1 December 2022. The 3,500-square-metre facility was developed through a partnership between Juanda International Airport and PT Jasa Angkasa Semesta Tbk (JAS), which was appointed as the Cargo Terminal Operator (CTO) following a competitive selection process for cargo and postal services.

With the operation of the new terminal, Juanda International Airport’s export capacity has increased from 43 tonnes to 110 tonnes, while import capacity has risen from 98 tonnes to 177 tonnes in the storage area, with an additional 51 tonnes accommodated in the mezzanine area.

The terminal is equipped with advanced systems, such as a Cargo Terminal Digitalisation system integrated into a unified Cargo System, designed to streamline business processes and enhance efficiency, transparency, and payment integration among all stakeholders within the cargo and logistics ecosystem. The system is also integrated with HS Code INSW and the National Logistics Ecosystem (NLE).

=== Development ===
On 25 February 2015, President Joko Widodo approved the development of Juanda Airport City, which includes plans for two additional runways and an integrated rail connection between Gubeng Railway Station and the airport via an elevated railway. Approximately 6,000 hectares (15,000 acres) of land were prepared for the expansion. Of this, around 1,500 hectares (3,700 acres) were allocated for the construction of two new runways and the development of Juanda Airport’s Terminal 3, while the remaining area was designated for the airport city development and the ultimate terminal building. Terminal 3 was projected to handle up to 62.5 million passengers annually. Combined with the capacity of Terminals 1 and 2, the airport’s total passenger handling capacity was expected to increase to 75 million passengers per year. In addition to the terminal expansion, Angkasa Pura I also planned to construct two new runways, each approximately 3,850 metres in length, with around 60 percent extending over the sea.

The new area for Juanda Airport is estimated to be 1,700 hectares (4,200 acres) and will be located in the northern part of the airport. Construction of two runways by will require the reclamation of about 4 kilometers (2.5 miles) stretch of land along Java's northern coastline. The land acquisition is expected to be completed by 2018. The development is planned in three phases. The first phase involves finalising the master plan, completing land acquisition, undertaking reclamation for Runway 2, and constructing Runway 2. The second phase focuses on the development of Terminal 1, reclamation for Runway 3, construction of Runway 3, and improving accessibility through toll road connections to the terminal. The third and final phase includes the construction of the Ultimate Terminal and supporting infrastructure for the airport city.

As of 2017, construction had not yet commenced due to competing priorities elsewhere, although the land required for the project had already been prepared. On the other hand, the development has been delayed due to the extensive sea reclamation required, which presents significant challenges. The permitting process for such large-scale reclamation is lengthy and complex.

== Airlines and destinations ==
=== Passenger ===
Airlines	Destinations
Airfast Indonesia	Charter: Jakarta–Soekarno-Hatta, Timika
Batik Air	Denpasar, Jakarta–Halim Perdanakusuma, Jakarta–Soekarno-Hatta, Makassar, Pangkalan Bun, Tanjung Redeb
Batik Air Malaysia	Kuala Lumpur–International
Cathay Pacific	Hong Kong
China Southern Airlines	Guangzhou, Shenzhen
Citilink	Balikpapan, Bandung–Husein Sastranegara, Banjarmasin, Batam, Denpasar, Jakarta–Halim Perdanakusuma, Jakarta–Soekarno-Hatta, Lombok, Makassar, Palangkaraya, Pontianak, Samarinda
Garuda Indonesia	Denpasar, Jakarta–Soekarno-Hatta
Greater Bay Airlines	Hong Kong
Indonesia AirAsia	Johor Bahru, Kuala Lumpur–International, Penang
Lion Air	Ambon, Balikpapan, Banjarmasin, Batam, Denpasar, Jakarta–Soekarno-Hatta, Kendari, Kupang, Lombok, Makassar, Manado, Medan, (Note: Medan is the continuation of Batam flight, operating under the same flight number.) Palangkaraya, Palembang, Palu, Pekanbaru, Pontianak, Tarakan, Ternate; Seasonal: Jeddah, Medina
Malaysia Airlines	Kuala Lumpur–International
NAM Air	Makassar, Pangkalan Bun, Sampit, Tambolaka
Pelita Air	Balikpapan, Jakarta–Soekarno-Hatta
Royal Brunei Airlines	Bandar Seri Begawan
Saudia	Seasonal: Jeddah, Medina
Scoot	Singapore
Singapore Airlines	Singapore
Sriwijaya Air	Makassar
Super Air Jet	Balikpapan, Banjarmasin, Denpasar, Jakarta–Soekarno-Hatta, Labuan Bajo, Lombok, Medan, Palangkaraya, Pontianak, Samarinda
Susi Air	Bawean
TransNusa	Denpasar
Wings Air	Banyuwangi, Sampit, Semarang
XiamenAir	Fuzhou

== Traffic ==
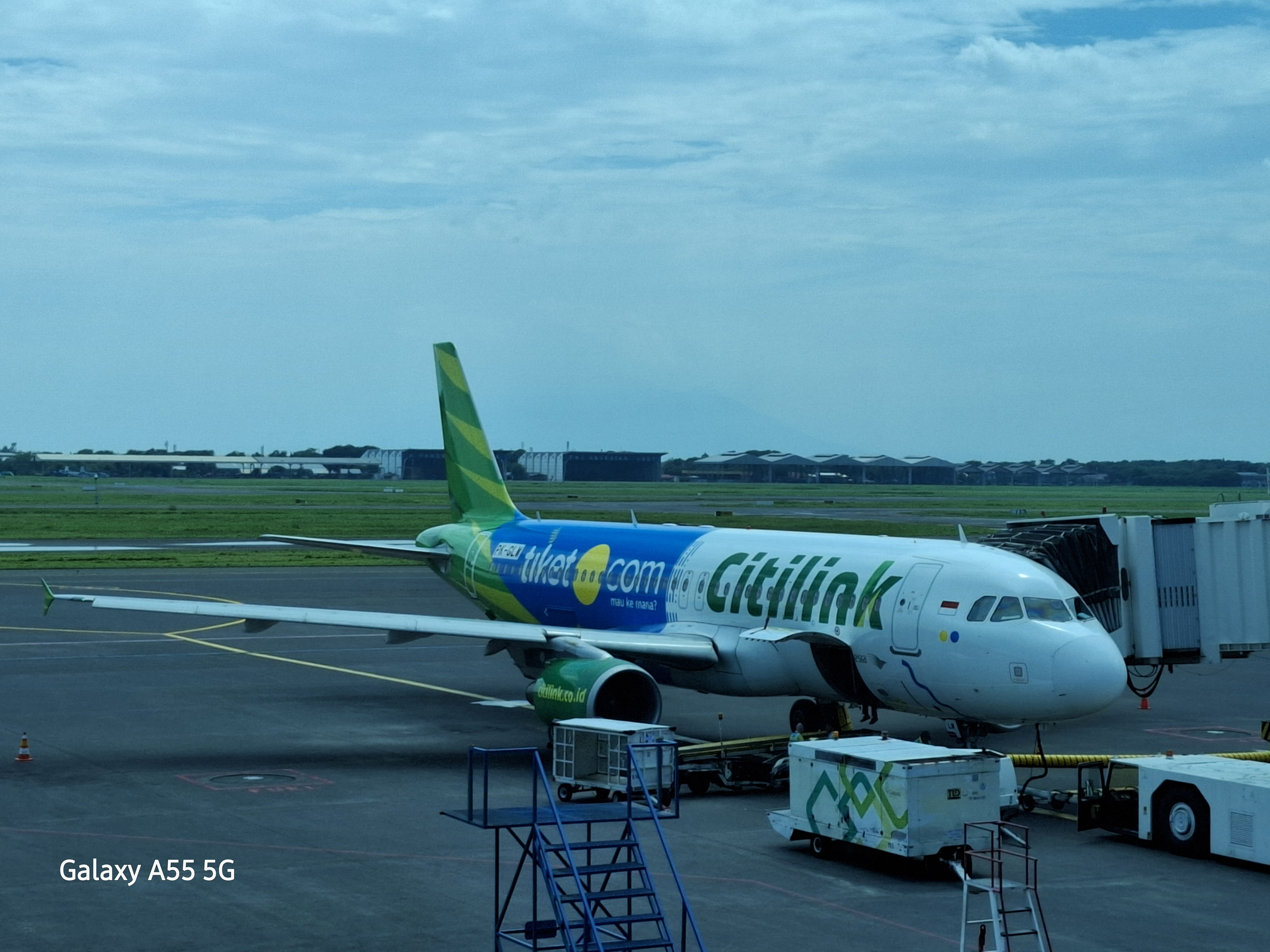
A Citilink Airbus A320 on standby at Juanda International Airport

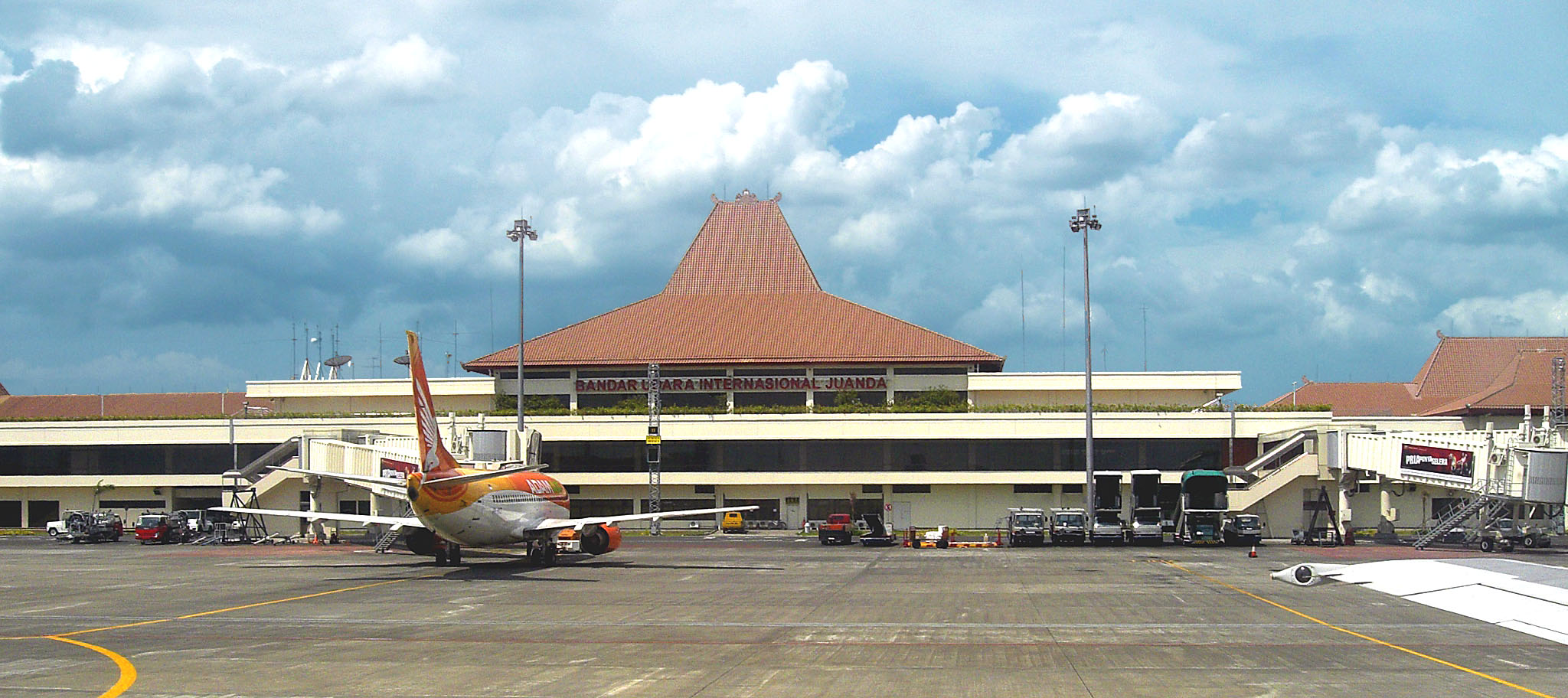
View of Juanda International Airport Terminal 1 in 2008, showing an Adam Air Boeing 737 on standby

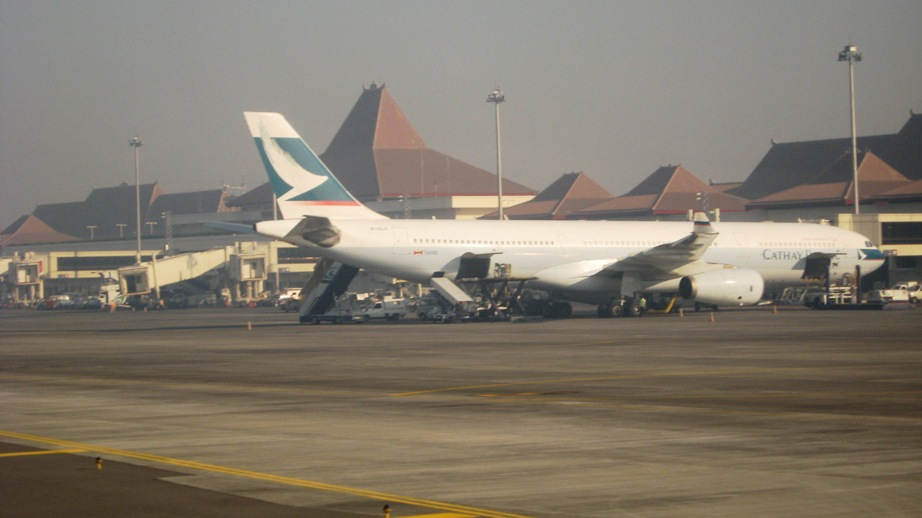
A Cathay Pacific Airbus A330-300 at Terminal 1 of Juanda International Airport in 2008. The airline now operates from Terminal 2

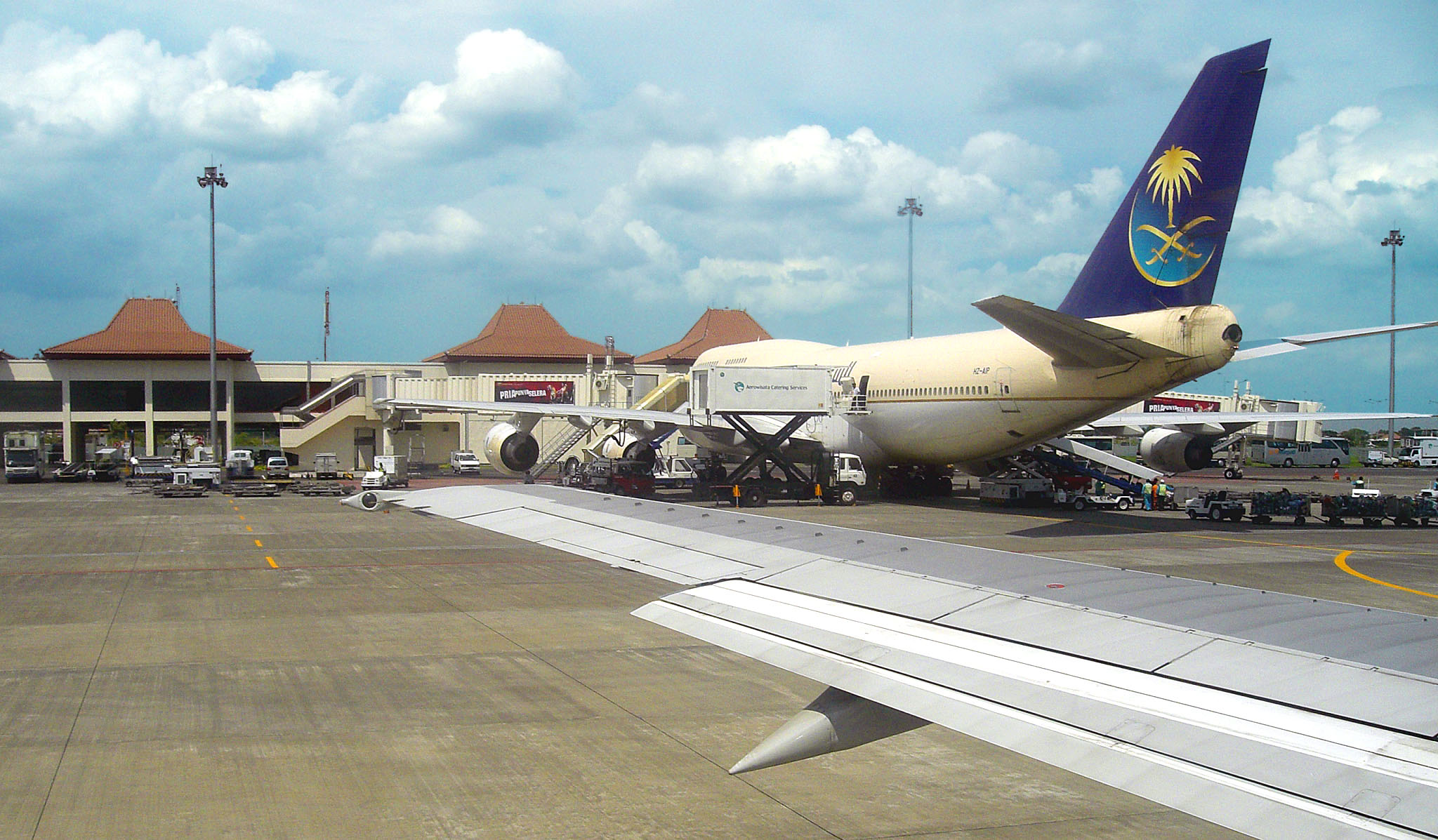
A Saudia Boeing 747-300 at Terminal 1, refueling and reloading to transport Indonesian Hajj pilgrims to Mecca

In 2010, the airport handled 11 million passengers, although the capacity was 6 million passengers and the air traffic controller radar system is only able to track 21 aircraft per hour, but at peak hour handled 40 to 45 aircraft landing and taking off.

Annual passenger numbers and aircraft statistics
Year	Passengers handled	Passenger % change	Cargo (tonnes)	Cargo % change	Aircraft movements	Aircraft % change
1999	2,137,353	Steady	40,549	Steady	52,284	Steady
2000	2,712,074	▲26.9	31,185	▼23.1	54,154	▲3.6
2001	3,301,435	▲21.7	37,767	▲21.1	62,141	▲14.7
2002	4,746,113	▲43.8	43,089	▲14.1	75,921	▲22.2
2003	6,584,711	▲38.7	42,910	▼0.4	82,779	▲9.0
2004	8,562,747	▲30.0	63,950	▲49.0	97,421	▲17.7
2005	8,217,415	▼4.0	66,647	▲4.2	99,485	▲2.1
2006	8,986,650	▲9.4	71,574	▲7.4	91,209	▼8.3
2007	8,823,228	▼1.8	58,815	▼17.8	87,687	▼3.9
2008	9,122,196	▲3.4	62,289	▲5.9	69,726	▼20.5
2009	10,562,906	▲15.8	62,357	▲0.1	76,754	▲10.1
2010	12,072,059	▲14.3	76,774	▲23.1	84,958	▲10.7
2011	13,778,287	▲14.1	95,146	▲23.9	103,846	▲22.2
2012	16,447,912	▲19.4	102,133	▲7.3	141,365	▲36.1
2013	17,683,955	▲7.5	121,935	▲19.4	155,421	▲9.9
2014	18,071,633	▲2.2	92,439	▼24.2	117,825	▼24.2
2015	18,911,256	▲4.6	130,398	▲41.1	166,208	▲41.1
2016	19,486,790	▲3.0	96,281	▼26.2	148,232	▼10.8
2017	20,127,844	▲3.3	97,657	▲1.4	148,565	▲0.2
2018	20,951,063	▲4.1	116,324	▲19.1	156,418	▲5.3
2019	16,626,186	▼20.6	88,305	▼24.1	129,542	▼17.2
2020	6,801,099	▼59.1	65,311	▼26.0	69,073	▼46.7
2021	5,909,590	▼13.1	70,244	▲7.6	55,804	▼19.2
2022	10,794,021	▲82.7	68,413	▼2.6	77,846	▲39.5
2023	14,010,882	▲29.8	67,493	▼1.3	96,255	▲23.6
2024	14,033,162	▲0.2	81,414	▲20.6	94,746	▼1.6
^{Source: DGCA, Angkasa Pura I}

Busiest domestic routes (2024)
Rank	Airport	Passengers	% change 2023/24
1	Jakarta, Jakarta (all airports)	1,888,633	▼1.1
2	Denpasar, Bali	650,318	▲7.4
3	Makassar, South Sulawesi	518,971	▼17.5
4	Balikpapan, East Kalimantan	482,201	▼2.8
5	Banjarmasin, South Kalimantan	421,567	▲1.8
6	Lombok, West Nusa Tenggara	227,611	▼14.1
7	Batam, Riau Islands	165,390	▼2.7
8	Samarinda, East Kalimantan	141,047	▼1.2
9	Kupang, East Nusa Tenggara	129,867	▼10.3
10	Pontianak, West Kalimantan	109,380	▼3.5

Total passenger movements by countries (2024)
Rank	Country	Passengers movement	% change 2023/24
1	Malaysia	480,552	▲27.4
2	Singapore	355,975	▲2.6
3	Saudi Arabia	164,697	▼34.3
4	Hong Kong	90,147	▲41.6
5	Brunei	28,764	▲24.4

== Naval Air Station Juanda ==
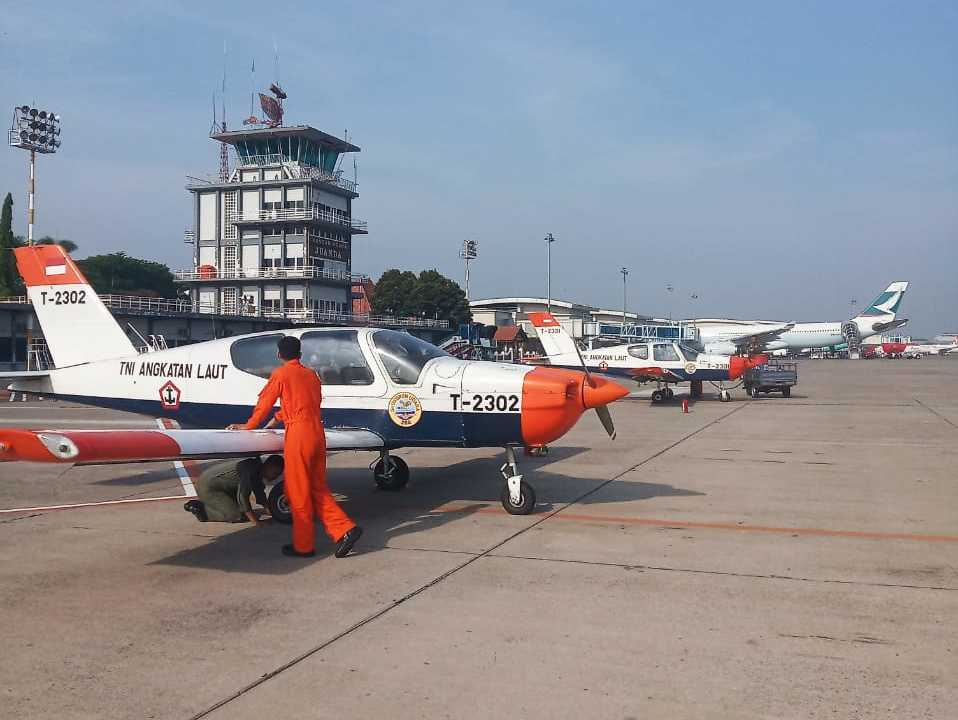
Two SOCATA TB-9 Tampico of the Indonesian Navy's Naval Aviation at Naval Air Station Juanda

The airport is also home to Naval Air Station Juanda, the largest air base of the Indonesian Navy’s Naval Aviation. The airbase facilities are located south of the runway, to the east of Terminal 2. The headquarters of the Naval Aviation is located at this air station, which oversees several squadrons under Air Wing 2 in Surabaya—one of the three air wings within the Naval Aviation command structure. The base is equipped with hangars and maintenance facilities supporting Naval Aviation aircraft operations. Its primary operational squadrons include the following:

- 100th Anti-Submarine Squadron - operating the AS565 MBe Panther helicopter,
- 200th Training Squadron - operating the SOCATA TB-9 Tampico, EC120B Colibri and the Beechcraft Bonanza G36,
- 600th Rapid Logistics Squadron - operating the CASA C-212-200 Aviocar,
- 700th UAV Squadron - operating the Boeing Insitu MQ-27 ScanEagle, and
- 800th Tactical Reconnaissance Squadron - operating the CASA CN-235-220 MPA.

In addition, the airbase is also home to the Naval Aviation Museum. The museum features a range of exhibits, including miniature fighter aircraft, aviation instruments, Indonesian Naval Aviation pilot and commando uniforms, and historical photographs displayed along its walls. It also houses several full-scale aircraft, including a Boeing 737-400.

== Ground transportation ==
=== Road ===
Juanda Airport is connected to the 15-kilometre Waru–Juanda Toll Road leading to Surabaya, which links the airport to the Surabaya–Gresik, Surabaya–Malang, and Surabaya–Mojokerto toll road networks. The airport is also accessible via Jalan Raya Waru toward Surabaya and Jalan Letjen S. Parman toward Sidoarjo. In addition, the Aloha interchange, whose construction began in 2022, was developed to improve traffic flow in and out of the airport.

=== Bus ===
Perum DAMRI operates bus services connecting Juanda Airport with Purabaya Terminal, with operations commencing in November 2006. The service was later expanded to include routes to Bunder Terminal in Gresik Regency, and Kertajaya Terminal in Mojokerto City. Bus services to Purabaya Terminal operate every 30 minutes, to Bunder Terminal every 60 minutes, and to Kertajaya Terminal every 120 minutes. Passengers can book tickets online through the DAMRI app or purchase them on the spot at departure points.

=== Rail ===
The proposal to develop a railway link to Juanda Airport has been under study for an extended period. In 2018, the Ministry of Transportation also raised the possibility of constructing a rail connection to the airport. In 2025, the East Java Transportation Agency argets the integration of the Juanda Airport Rail Link with the Surabaya–Sidoarjo Commuter Line (KRL) starting in 2027. This plan forms part of the Surabaya Regional Railway Line (SRRL) development, which is supported by Germany’s KfW Development Bank. The Juanda Airport Rail Link is also planned to be integrated into a light rail transit (LRT) system supported by the United Kingdom. The line will connect at Waru Station, which is envisioned as a major transport hub. From there, the airport rail service will link with the Surabaya–Sidoarjo Commuter Line at Waru Station, which is also planned to be connected to Bungurasih Bus Terminal. To reduce congestion, the airport rail line is planned to be constructed as an elevated railway from Waru Station to Juanda Airport Terminal 1. Passengers traveling to Terminal 2 will be served by shuttle buses from Terminal 1. Although the SRRL project is targeted for development starting in 2027, the exact construction timeline for the airport rail link has not yet been confirmed. At present, both projects remain in the feasibility study stage.

== Accidents and incidents ==
- 21 February 2007: Adam Air Flight 172, a Boeing 737-300 (registered PK-KKV) flying from Jakarta to Surabaya made a hard landing at Juanda International Airport, resulting in structural failure of the aircraft.
- 1 February 2014: Lion Air Flight 361, a Boeing 737-900ER (registered PK-LFH) from Balikpapan Sultan Aji Muhammad Sulaiman Airport to Juanda International Airport landed hard and bounced four times on the runway, causing a tail strike and substantial damage to the plane. There were no fatalities, but two passengers were seriously injured and three others had minor injuries.
