= 91st Field Artillery Regiment (PA) =

- Active: August 28, 1941 - April 9, 1942
- Disbanded: April 9, 1942
- Countries: United States of America; Philippines
- Allegiance: United States Army
- Branch: Army
- Type: Field Artillery
- Role: Fire Support
- Size: 1,500
- Part of: 91st Infantry Division
- Garrison/HQ: Camp Downes, Tacloban, Leyte
- Equipment: M1916 75mm Howitzers; QF2.95inch Mountain Guns
- Engagements: Battle of Bataan

Commanders
- Notable commanders: Lieutenant Colonel Victor Gomez, PA

91st Field Artillery Regiment is a reserve unit of Philippine Commonwealth Army activated and organized in August 1941. It is part of 91st Infantry Division under Brigadier General Luther R. Stevens, PA who fought in Battle of Bataan. Whole regiment became POW after surrendering on April 9, 1942, to Japanese 14th Army.

== Organization ==
The regiment was activated in Tacloban, Leyte and recruits came for Leyte and Samar Island except for some officers who came from Luzon. Lieutenant Colonel Victor Gomez of Philippine Army was appointed to command.

HQ Battery is under 3Lieutenant Armando Daffon, 1st Battalion under 2nd Lieutenant Rizal De Umali, 2nd Battalion is under 1st Lieutenant Gregorio Fajardo, and 3rd Battalion under 3rd Lieutenant Benjamin Labayen.

=== Transfer to Luzon ===
Right before the completion of the training, the 91st Division was ordered transferred to Luzon along with its 2 Infantry Regiments and the only field artillery regiment. It reached Manila on September 10, 1941. They were moved to Camp Del Pilar, Dau, Pampanga for further training.

=== Combat narratives ===
The 91st Division was held as a reserve force of the Philippine Army. It did not see action at the start of the hostilities of World War II in the Philippines. However, 91st Field Artillery was attached to 71st Division during Battle of Layac Junction.

The 91st Field Artillery fought at the II Corps Area under Major General George M. Parker, it fought in the Abucay-Mauban Line and was transferred to I Corps and participated in holding the Orion-Bagac Line.

== See also ==
- 91st Infantry Division
- North Luzon Force
- Luzon Force
- Battle of Bataan
