= Sedati =

District in Sidoarjo Regency, East Java Province, Indonesia

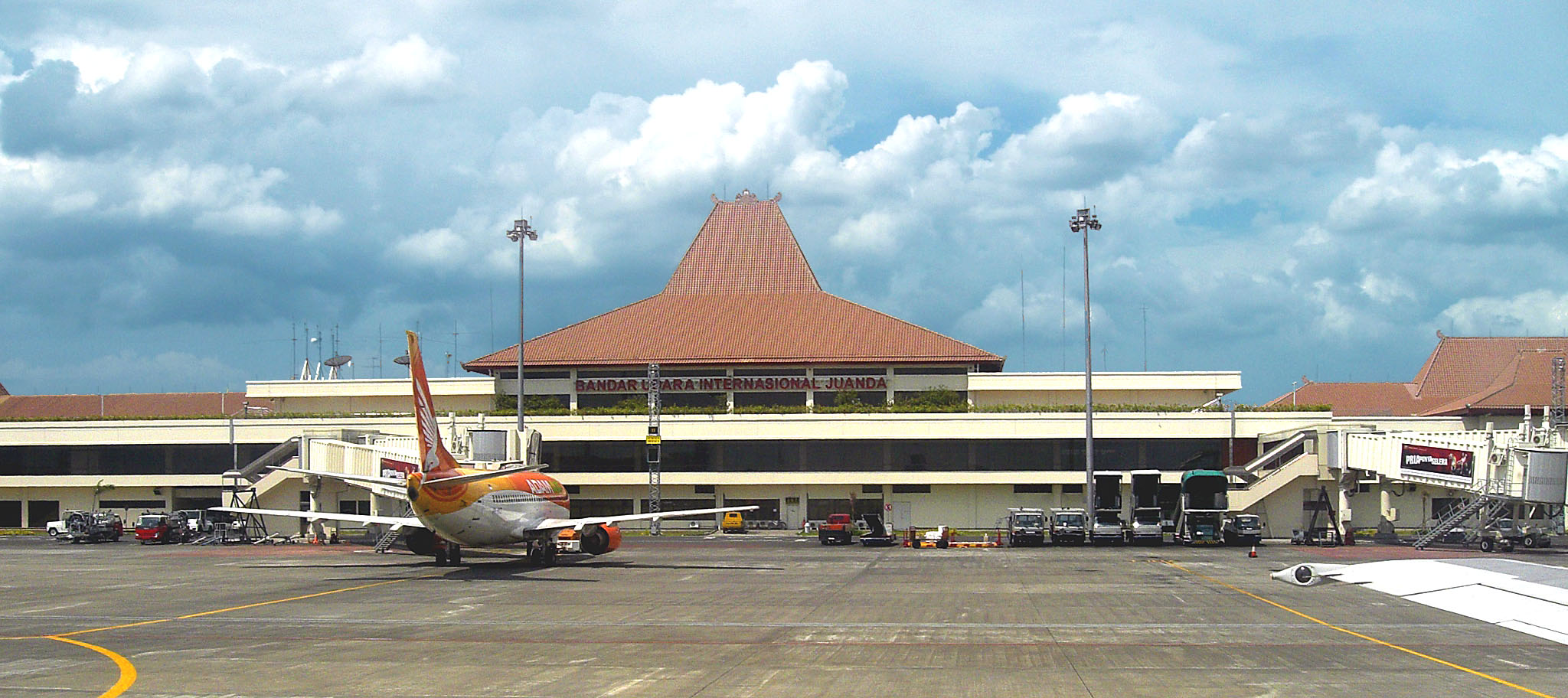
Juanda International Airport

Sedati is a district in the Sidoarjo Regency in Java, Indonesia. Juanda International Airport is located in this district.
