= Battle of Beijing =

Battle of Beijing may refer to multiple battles fought in what is now Beijing:

- Battle of Gaoliang River (979), between the Liao and Song dynasties
- Battle of Zhongdu (1215), between the Mongols and the Jurchen Jin dynasty
- Battle of Dadu (1368), Ming dynasty army captured Yuan capital Dadu
- Defense of Beijing (1449), Ming dynasty successfully defended invasion against Oirat Mongols
- Battle of Beijing (1644), between the Ming dynasty and rebel Li Zicheng
- 1860, during the Second Opium War
- 1865, during the Nian Rebellion
- Battle of Peking (1900), during the Boxer Rebellion
- 1920, during the Zhili–Anhui War
- 1922, during the First Zhili–Fengtian War
- 1928, during the Second Chinese Revolutionary War, part of the Chinese Civil War
- Battle of Beiping–Tianjin (1937), during the Second Sino-Japanese War
- Pingjin Campaign (1948–1949), during the Third Chinese Revolutionary War, part of the Chinese Civil War

== See also ==
- History of Beijing
