= Jonathan Wainwright =

Jonathan Wainwright may refer to:

- Jonathan Mayhew Wainwright (bishop) (1792–1854), Episcopal Bishop of New York
- Jonathan Mayhew Wainwright (naval officer) (1821–1863), United States Navy officer killed in the American Civil War, son of the above
- J. Mayhew Wainwright (1864–1945), United States Congressman, army officer in the Spanish–American War and World War I, and United States Assistant Secretary of War from 1921 to 1923, grandson of the bishop
- Jonathan M. Wainwright (general) (1883–1953), United States Army general during World War II, grandson of the USN officer

== See also ==
- John Wainwright (disambiguation)
