= John L. Wainwright =

John L. Wainwright is a Hampshire-born writer and historian researching the Spanish Civil War and International Brigades volunteers.

== Life ==
Wainwright is interested in social history which places emphasis on the lives of people. In his 2012 book The Last to Fall: the Life and Letters of Ivor Hickman, he reproduces the love letters sent by a young International Brigades Military Observer (who was also a former student of Ludwig Wittgenstein) in the months leading up to his death in the final hours of fighting in Spain, 1938. Among those interviewed for his analysis were Sam Lesser and David Marshall.
