= 48th Division (Imperial Japanese Army) =

- Active: 30 November 1940 – 15 August 1945
- Disbanded: 15 August 1945
- Country: Japan
- Branch: Imperial Japanese Army
- Type: Infantry
- Size: 25,000
- Garrison/HQ: Taiwan
- Engagements: World War II

Commanders
- Notable commanders: Yuichi Tsuchihashi

The 48th Division (第48師団, Dai-yonjūhachi Shidan) was an infantry division of the Imperial Japanese Army. Its call sign was the Sea Division (海兵団, Umi Heidan).

The IJA 22nd Army was a short-lived component of the Southern China Area Army from February to November 1940 during the Second Sino-Japanese War. A component of the IJA 22nd Army was the Taiwan Mixed Brigade (台湾混成旅団), which was involved in combat operations in Guangdong Province. The division was formed 30 November 1940 as the 48th Brigade and was led by Seiichi Kuno, who led the 22nd Army prior to its dissolution. The 48th was elevated to division status under the IJA 23rd Army and in August 1941 was transferred to Taihoku in Taiwan.

The division was composed of the 27th Independent Mixed Brigade (Taiwan Mixed Brigade) and the 47th Infantry Regiment, which became available when the IJA 6th Division transitioned from a rectangular to a triangular division. The 48th Division was initially part of the Taiwan Army, before being reassigned to the IJA 14th Army on 12 August 1941. In preparation for the Pacific War, the division was mechanized (along with the IJA 5th Division), which was completed 6 November 1941.

Lieutenant General Yuitsu Tsuchihashi was placed in command starting September 1941 after Kuno was forced to retire due to his role in the unauthorized invasion of Indochina. On 13 December 1941, the IJA 48th Division was split, with units going to each of the three task forces of the Invasion of Lingayen Gulf. The 47th Regiment transferred to Kaohsiung, the Taiwan regiments transferred to Magong, and the other regiments transferred to Keelung.

The 48th Division's Organization for the Invasion of Lingayen Gulf
Task force	Regiment	Location before departure	Date of departure	Location of landing in Lingayen Gulf
First	9th Armored Regiment	Keelung, Formosa	17 December 1941	Damortis, Philippines
First	48th Field Hospital	Keelung, Formosa	17 December 1941	Damortis, Philippines
First	48th Artillery / Recon	Keelung, Formosa	17 December 1941	Damortis, Philippines
Second	1st Taiwan Regiment	Magong, Formosa	18 December 1941	Aringay, Philippines
Second	2nd Taiwan Regiment	Magong, Formosa	18 December 1941	Aringay, Philippines
Third	47th Infantry Regiment	Kaohsiung, Formosa	18 December 1941	Agoo, Philippines
Third	4th Armored Regiment	Kaohsiung, Formosa	18 December 1941	Agoo, Philippines

The division landed at Lingayen Gulf as part of the IJA 14th Army. The 4th Armored Regiment encountered resistance from the 26th Philippine Cavalry on 24 December at Binalonan. The 26th fiercely repelled the attackers, holding off the tanks with Molotov cocktails. The two regiments of Formosan infantry attempted to try and break through, but failed to as they were charged at by mounted defenders. Finally, the 47th Infantry was called in, and broke through the American defenses; the unit continued forth after this engagement and captured Manila, but did not participate in the Battle of Bataan. Instead, in January 1942 the division was transferred to the control of the IJA 16th Army in eastern Java, where it was assigned the capture of Surabaya and its strategic oil fields on 7 March 1942.

Afterwards, the IJA 48th Division was assigned to garrison of the island of Timor as part of the IJA 19th Army. Although the island had been captured by Japan in the Battle of Timor, much of the island was still in the hands of Australian and Dutch commandos. Tsuchihashi launched a major counter-offensive in an attempt to push the Australians into a corner on the south coast of the island. The Japanese also recruited significant numbers of Timorese civilians, who provided intelligence on Allied movements. The island was secured when the remaining Australian commandos were evacuated in December 1942.

The IJA 19th Army was abolished on 28 February 1945, and the division became subordinate to the IJA 16th Army.

The IJA 48th Division remained as a garrison force on Timor until the surrender of Japan.

== See also ==
- List of Japanese Infantry Divisions

== Reference and further reading ==
- Madej, W. Victor. Japanese Armed Forces Order of Battle, 1937-1945 [2 vols] Allentown, PA: 1981
