= 91st Division (Philippines) =

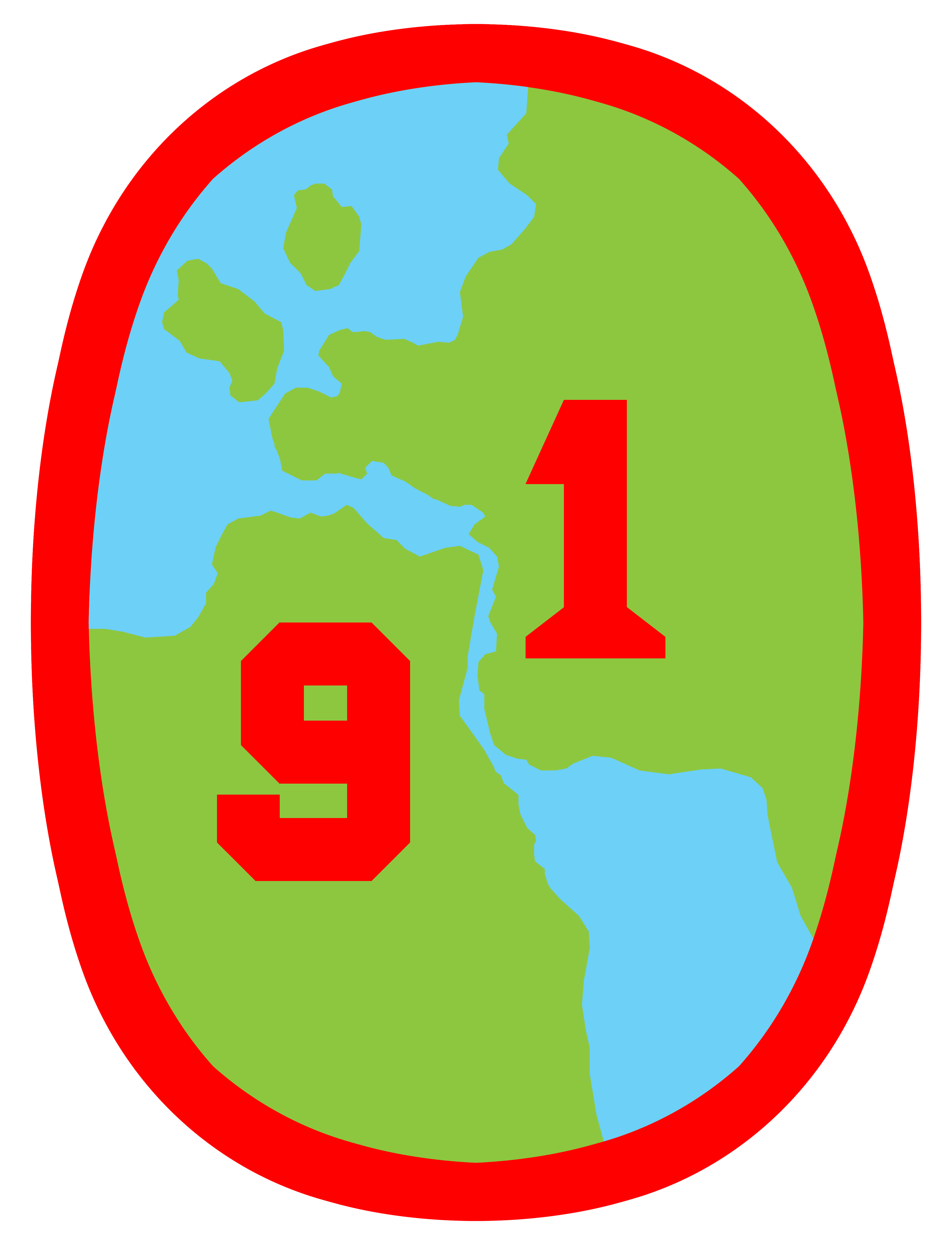
- 91st Philippine Division Emblem 1941-42
- Active: 1941 - 9 April 1942
- Country: Commonwealth of the Philippines
- Branch: Philippine Army
- Type: Infantry Division
- Size: 6.000
- Part of: SLF (II Philippine Corps) (Jan 1942 - Apr 1942); Reserve Force (Nov 1941 - Jan 1942)
- Garrison/HQ: Camp Murphy, Quezon City, Rizal
- Engagements: World War II: Battle of Bataan; Philippines campaign (1941–1942)

Commanders
- Commander(s): Col. (later BGen.) Luther R. Stevens Col. Stuart MacDonald (Acting)
- Chief of Staff: Col. Edgar H. Keltner; LCol. Jaime Velasquez

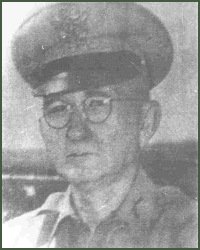
Brigadier General Luther Stevens an american in Philippine Army.

The 91st Infantry Division was a division of the Philippine Army under the United States Army Forces in the Far East (USAFFE).

== History ==
It was active from 1941 to April 9, 1942, whereupon it surrendered when Bataan fell. Col. (later BGen.) Luther R. Stevens (PA) was the division's commander, and Col. Edgar H. Keltner, Inf., was Chief of Staff. The unit was activated in Leyte and was transferred in November 1941 to Luzon taking only 91st, 92nd Infantry Regiments, and 91st Field Artillery Regiment. 93rd Regiment was left behind as it was still being mobilized. Eventually 93rd was transferred to Mindanao by General Sharp commander of Visayan-Mindanao Force leaving only newly recruits and PC units defending in Leyte-Samar area. Additional supporting units area attached when the division reached Luzon.

Division Staffs

Colonel Stuart MacDonald was acting commander and Lieutenant Colonel Jaime Velasquez as Chief of Staff when the division as organized in Leyte in August. Ordered transfer to main land Luzon to bolster its defense Colonel Luther Steves arrived in November and assumed command. Colonel Stuart relegated as Division Chief of Staff, Colonel Velasquez as appointed as commandant of the division headquarters. When Colonel Stuart was appointed as South Luzon Force Chief of Staff, He was replaced by Colonel Edward Keltner. Division G3 is Captain Ricardo Papa.

=== Combat narrative ===
At the outset of hostilities, 8 December 1941, the 91st Division (PA) was part of the USAFFE Reserve Force, alongside the U.S. Army's Philippine Division, the 1st Tank Group (Provisional), and three smaller Philippine Scouts units (43rd Infantry (PS), 86th FA Bn. (PS), & 88th FA Regt. (PS).)

== Order of battle ==
- Headquarters, 91st Division - LCol. Jaime Velasquez, PA
- 91st Infantry Regiment (PA) (LCol Stuart C. MacDonald)
- 92nd Infantry Regiment (PA) (Col. John H. Rodman, Inf.; XO: Col. James D Carter, Inf.)
  - 3rd Battalion - Major Judson B. Crow, USA
- 93rd Infantry Regiment (PA) (Maj. John C. Goldtrap) (left behind on Samar & Leyte, 9 Dec 41; transf. to Mindanao Force Reserves)
- 91st Field Artillery Regiment (PA) - LCol Victor Gomez
  - 91st FA Regt HQ Company
  - 1st Bn/91st FA Regt (PA) (75mm guns, 8x))
  - 2nd Bn/91st FA Regt (PA) (2.95-inch pack howitzers, 8x)
  - 3rd Bn/91st FA Regt (PA)
- 91st Engineer Battalion (PA) - Captain A.P. Chanco
- 91st Medical Battalion
- 91st Division Units
  - 91st Division Headquarters & HQ Company
  - 91st Signal Company
  - 91st Quartermaster Company (Motorized)
  - 91st QM Transport Company (Truck)
  - 91st Ordinance Company
  - MP Platoon

== Order of battle (December 1941 to April 1942 in Bataan) ==
- General Staff - LCol Edgar Keltner, USA
- 91st Infantry Regiment (PA) (LCol James Carter)
  - HQ Bn
  - 1st Bn - Capt Adriano Valdez
  - 2nd Bn
  - 3rd Bn - Maj. Judson B. Crow
- 92nd Infantry Regiment (PA) (Col. John H. Rodman, Inf.; XO: Col. James D Carter, Inf.)
  - 1st Bn - Maj. Umali
  - 2nd Bn - Maj Judson Crow
  - 3rd Battalion - Maj Charles Browne Jr
- 91st Field Artillery Regiment - LCol. John Hoskins | LCol Roger Hunter
  - 91st FA Regt HQ Company - Capt George Dewey Vanture
  - 1st Bn/91st FA Regt (PA) (75mm guns, 8x))
  - 2nd Bn/91st FA Regt (PA) (2.95-inch pack howitzers, 8x)
  - 3rd Bn/91st FA Regt (PA)
- 91st Engineer Battalion (PA) - Captain A.P. Chanco
- 91st Medical Battalion - Capt Geronimo Cruz
- 91st Division Units
  - 91st Division Headquarters & HQ Company
  - 91st Signal Company
  - 91st Quartermaster Company (Motorized)
  - 91st QM Transport Company (Truck)

=== Unit in Mindanao ===
- 93rd Infantry Regiment - Maj. John Goldstrap (attached to Agusan Sector and later Mindanao Force reserves)

== Post War ==
91st Infantry Division was not immediately reactivated after the war. It was however reactivated as Standby Reserve division under the Philippine Army Reserve Command in 1996 and moved its headquarters in Camp Dau in Pagadian City, Zamboanga Sibugay Province in Mindanao Island.

== Notable members ==
- Manuel Yan - became chief of Philippine Constabulary and the youngest AFP Chief of Staff from 1968 to 1971.
- Juan Pajota - led guerilla group in Nueva Ecija, held Cabu bridge during the raid in Cabanatuan POW Camp and rescued the prisoners.
- Ricardo Papa - Future Chief of Police of Manila

=== Sources ===
- Morton, Louis (1953). United States Army in World War II, The War in the Pacific: The Fall of the Philippines. Washington, D.C.: Center of Military History, United States Army.
- Whitman, John W. (1990). Bataan: Our Last Ditch : The Bataan Campaign, 1942. Hippocrene Books. ISBN 0-87052-877-7.

== Bibliography ==
- Morton, Louis. The Fall of the Philippines (Publication 5-2) . Retrieved on 14 Feb 2017.
