= 93rd Infantry Regiment (PA) =

93rd Infantry Regiment (Philippines)
- Active: 1941 - 1942
- Disbanded: May 1942
- Countries: United States of America; Philippines
- Allegiance: United States Army; Philippine Commonwealth Army
- Branch: Infantry
- Type: Light Infantry
- Role: Reserve Infantry
- Size: 1,500
- Part of: Reserve Brigade, Mindanao Force Agusan Sector; Samar Brigade 91st Division (Philippines)
- Garrison/HQ: Camp Downes, Leyte
- Equipment: M1917 Enfield Bolt Action Rifles; M1917 Browning Machineguns
- Engagements: Battle of Mangiman Canyon

Commanders
- Notable commanders: Major John Goldstrap, USA; Lieutenant Colonel Ben-Hur Chastaine

Insignia
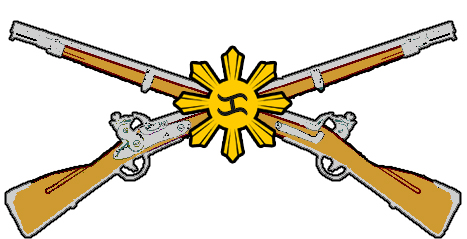
- Identification symbol

93rd Infantry Regiment is a unit of 91st Infantry Division of Philippine Army activated in 1941. It was not organized until late of 1941. So it was left in Leyte island while the rest of the division was transferred to Luzon island to bolster its defense. It fought in Mindanao island where it was ordered to surrender and became POWs.

== Organization ==
The regiment was the last to be organized of the 91st Division and it was left in Leyte as it was still being organized and undergoing training. Captain John Goldtrap of 31st Infantry Regiment of US Army along with other young officers and enlisted men was sent to train the men and advise the officers. As the hostilities commence Goldtrap was given of the command. In December 1941, it was part of Samar Brigade under Colonel Theodore Cornell along with 81st Infantry Regiment who was transferred from Cebu.

=== Transfer to Mindanao ===
In January 1942, the brigade was ordered to transfer to Mindanao, the second largest island in the Philippines to bolster its defense. Major Goldtrap took over the command of the regiment as Colonel BenHur Chastaine was moved to command the brigade during its transfer and upon arrival in Mindanao.

==== Combat ====
In March 1942, the regiment was transferred to Bukidnon as part of Colonel William Dalton's reserve force of Mindanao Force. It was posted in the left side of Mangima Canyon extended to Dalirig. It went to action to prevent Japanese move southward of Sayre highway. They fought at the Battle of Mangima Canyon and gave the Japanese high casualties but had to pullback as 62nd Infantry Regiment withdrawn on their left flank. Visayas-Mindanao Force commander Major General William F. Sharp ordered all units in Mindanao to surrender at daybreak on May 11, 1942.

== See also ==
- 91st Infantry Division
- 102nd Infantry Division
- Mindanao Force
