= Luther R. Stevens =

American military officer

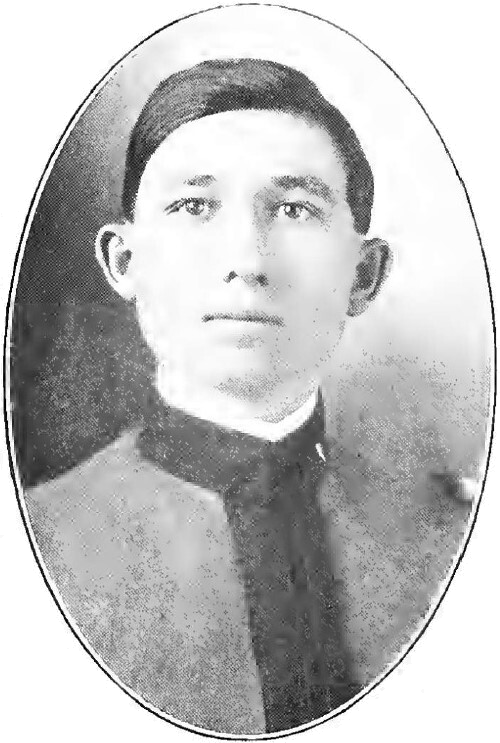
- As a Mississippi A&M cadet in 1910
- Born: 3 July 1889; Wesson, Mississippi, US
- Died: 7 February 1973 (aged 83) St. Petersburg, Florida, US
- Service years: 1910–1948
- Rank: Colonel (PC); Brigadier General (PA); Colonel (USA)
- Commands: 91st Division (Philippines); Philippine Constabulary Academy
- Conflicts: World War I; World War II; Battle of Bataan
- Awards: Distinguished Service Cross; Distinguished Service Medal

Luther Rea Stevens (3 July 1889 – 7 February 1973) was a military officer who served in the Philippine Constabulary, Philippine Army and United States Army. During World War II, he commanded the 91st Division during the Philippines campaign and then spent more than three years as a prisoner of war after surrendering at Bataan in April 1942.

== Early life and education ==
Stevens was born and raised in Wesson, Mississippi. He earned a B.S. degree in mechanical engineering from the A&M College of Mississippi in 1910, where he was a classmate of William E. Brougher. Stevens graduated from the Philippine Constabulary School in December 1910. He completed the Infantry School advanced course at Fort Benning, Georgia in 1939 and the Command and General Staff School at Fort Leavenworth, Kansas in 1940.

== Career ==
Stevens accepted a commission as a third lieutenant in the Philippine Constabulary in July 1910. He was also commissioned in the United States Army Officers' Reserve Corps.

Stevens was promoted to major in January 1922 and subsequently received a temporary promotion to lieutenant colonel in March 1924. He then served as constabulary commander in the District of Mindanao and Sulu from March 1924 to July 1927. Permanently promoted to lieutenant colonel in January 1927, Stevens led the response to Moro uprisings in January and February 1927.

Stevens served as superintendent of the Philippine Constabulary Academy from July to December 1927 before resuming command in the District of Mindanao and Sulu in January 1929. He again led the response to a Moro uprising in October 1932. Stevens was promoted to colonel in February 1933. He was honorably discharged from his U.S. Army Reserve commission in March 1936 when the Philippine military forces were reorganized.

After the Philippine Constabulary was absorbed into the United States Army Forces in the Far East in 1941, Stevens became a colonel in the Philippine Army. He was given command of the 91st Division and then promoted to brigadier general in December 1941. During subsequent combat with Japanese forces, Stevens earned the Distinguished Service Cross. After capture, he survived the Bataan Death March. As a non-Filipino general officer, Stevens was interned with senior U.S. Army officers. His wife Lula and daughter Betty were imprisoned at the Santo Tomas Internment Camp. His three sons were studying in the United States at the time of the Japanese invasion.

After his liberation from Hoten Camp, Manchuria in 1945, President Harry S. Truman nominated him for permanent appointment as a brigadier general in the United States Army along with sixteen other prisoner-of-war camp survivors who already held temporary appointments as U.S. Army major or brigadier generals. When the original nomination expired at the end of the congressional session, it was resubmitted in January 1946 but failed to obtain Senate confirmation. Stevens instead accepted an appointment as a temporary U.S. Army colonel in July 1946. He retired from active duty as a U.S. Army Reserve colonel on 31 August 1948.

== Later life ==
Stevens and his wife lived in West Palm Beach, Florida after his retirement. They died in an automobile accident in St. Petersburg, Florida and were interred in his family's plot at the Wesson Cemetery in Mississippi.
