= 72nd Infantry Regiment (PA) =

- Active: August 28, 1942 – April 9, 1942
- Disbanded: April 9, 1942
- Countries: United States of America; Commonwealth of the Philippines
- Allegiance: United States Army; Philippine Commonwealth Army
- Branch: Army
- Type: Infantry
- Role: Reserve
- Size: 1,500
- Part of: 71st Division (Philippines)
- Garrison/HQ: Camp Tinio, Nueva Ecija; Camp Murcia, Negros Occidental
- Equipment: M1918 3inch Stokes Mortar M2 Browning Heavy Machineguns M1918 Browning Automatic Rifles M1917 Enfield Rifles
- Engagements: Battle of Points, Bataan; Battle of Tarlac, Tarlac; Battle of Layac Junction, Bataan; Battle of Rosario, Pangasinan

Commanders
- Notable commanders: Colonel Virgil Cordero Lieutenant Colonel Irving Compton Lieutenant Colonel Lloyd Biggs

72nd Infantry Regiment, is a reserve military unit and formation of Philippine Commonwealth Army who fought during World War II in Northern Luzon and in Bataan Peninsula. 72nd Infantry was under 71st Division and was first designated as reserve unit of North Luzon Force under Major General Jonathan M. Wainwright IV, USA that can only be committed if permitted from USAFFE Headquarters.

== Background ==
72nd Infantry was activated and organized in Negros Occidental province on August 28, 1941, and was house in a camp in Magallon, Negros Occidental. It was composed mostly of reservist in Negros island, they were inducted to USAFFE by Captain Sam Jones on August 28, 1942. USAFFE ordered it transferred to the mainland Luzon along with other units of its parent unit 71st Infantry Division and continue its training to fight Japanese invasion. They left Negros for Manila on September 1, 1942, and arrived two days later. They were transported to Fort McKinley as they were initially designated as reserve force for South Luzon force but eventually transferred and designated as reserve unit of North Luzon Force. They were transferred to Camp Tinio in Nueva Ecija to continue training and further assemble the entire division, it is now under Colonel Clyde Selleck.

=== Commanders ===
Lieutenant Colonel Lloyd Biggs was appointed as its first commander and Captain Sofronio Jimenea as his executive officer, he brought the regiment to Luzon and commanded into combat at the early stage of the Japanese invasion. He was replaced by Lieutenant Colonel Irving Compton after Battle of Layac Junction as he was transferred to the island of Corregidor. Compton was replaced by former 52nd Infantry commander Colonel Virgilio Cordero after the Battle of Points.

Battalion was lead initially by the following officers 1Lieutenant Santiago Nuñez commanded 1st Battalion, 1Lieutenant Robin Abao commanded 2nd Battalion, and 1Lieutenant Librado Ureta commanded 3rd Battalion.

In Bataan, Major Caswell took command of the 1st Battalion, former regimental executive officer Captain Sofronio Jimenea took over 2nd Battalion, and Captain Johnson commanded 3rd Battalion.

=== Combat ===
On December 8, 1941, all units were put on high alert as Japanese bombed Pearl Harbor and Clark Air Fields. 71st Division units including 72nd Infantry was moved to Camp O'Donnell in Capas, Tarlac. As Japanese unexpectedly landed on the eastern coasts of Lingayen gulf North Luzon Force headquarters was not able to anticipated the Japanese actions it put troops of 11th Division and 21st Division in quandary. This force General Wainwright to send 26th US Cavalry, elements of 192nd Tank Battalion, and elements of 71st Division (71st and 72nd Infantry) to Pangasinan, to delay Japanese advance to the south . 71st Infantry was placed in Rosario and 72nd was placed in Dagupan - Binalonan line. Japanese continued its advanced despite heroic effort of 26th Cavalry and put 71st Infantry retreating towards Baguio. 72nd Infantry put up a defense in Binalonan but could not hold the Japanese combined and coordinated attack of infantry, armored, artillery, and air superiority.

=== WPO 3 and Delaying Actions in the North ===
On December 22, 1942, USAFFE notified all its units of the old War Plan Orange 3 in effect due to unexpected Japanese landings in Lamon Bay. North Luzon Force now is to make delaying actions and will withdraw to Bataan peninsula. 72nd fought Japanese Tanaka detachment in D3 to cover retreating units to D4 line.

=== Battle of Layac Junction ===
Now promoted Brigadier General Selleck was tasked to put up a defense in Layac Junction in Dinalupihan, Bataan the main entrance of the peninsula to give time for forces in the peninsula to organized. It will be the first time 71st Division will be fighting as one unit including 72nd Infantry together with 71st Infantry and 71st Field Artillery was put in the line. To reinforced the division North Luzon Force headquarters attached 26th Cavalry (PS), 31st US Infantry, 2 Batteries of 86th Field Artillery (PS), and tanks from 192nd US Tank Battalion. However, no long range artillery guns 155mm was allocated on this line. Division artillery only have the old M1916 75mm Howitzers and 2.95inch Mountain Guns. Japanese Imai Detachment started its barrage with their 100mm and 155mm guns outgunned these guns.

=== Service Area Command ===
After Battle of Layac Junction 71st Division was so battered and their fighting capability was down to less than 2,000 due to casualties, sick, and exhaustion. 71st Division units are placed in Service Area Command in Mariveles, Bataan for rest and refit. Its commander Lieutenant Colonel Lloyd Biggs was transferred to Corregidor Island and replaced with Lieutenant Colonel Irving Compton.

==== Battle of Points ====
In February 1942, Japanese attempted to land in the west coast in Service Area Command, General McBride hurriedly sent 71st Division of General Selleck to thwart this landings. 72nd Infantry was engaged in preventing Japanese to expand the beachhead, high casualties on both sides prompted General McBride to reinforced them with PC units, Marines, and Air Provisional Infantry Regiment. USAFFE headquarters assessed the situation and concluded that General Selleck is not aggressive enough to attack Japanese positions. This made General MacArthur decision to replaced him with newly promoted Brigadier General Clinton Pierce former commander of 26th US Cavalry. However, they failed to see that undermanned regiments of 72nd and 71st Infantry due to casualties, hunger, and sickness due to malaria. By the end of February, with reinforcements from Marines and PC units and fire support from Corregidor finally defeated the Japanese landings were defeated in these points.

=== Bagac-Orion Line ===
In March, after General Homma was reinforced with fresh troops from China, British Malaya, and Singapore. He ordered another assault of Bagac-Orion Line, were his troops was defeated on its first attempt last February. 71st Division was placed in I Corps under Major General Albert Jones to support I Corps troops. I Corps area was breach at the right flank coming from II Corps west flank, 72nd Infantry was sent to reinforced 31st Division. However, II Corps was disseminated and troops dispersed into the forest.

=== Surrender ===
Seeing his troops could no longer hold and fight, General Edward P. King, commander moved forward and surrender entire Bataan Force on April 9, 1942. All units was dissolved and soldiers became POWs and endured 65 mile March came to be known as Bataan Death March.

== See also ==
- 71st Infantry Division
- North Luzon Force
- Battle of Layac Junction
- Battle of Bataan
- Clyde Selleck
- Virgilio Cordero
