= Alva R. Fitch =

United States Army general (1907–1989)

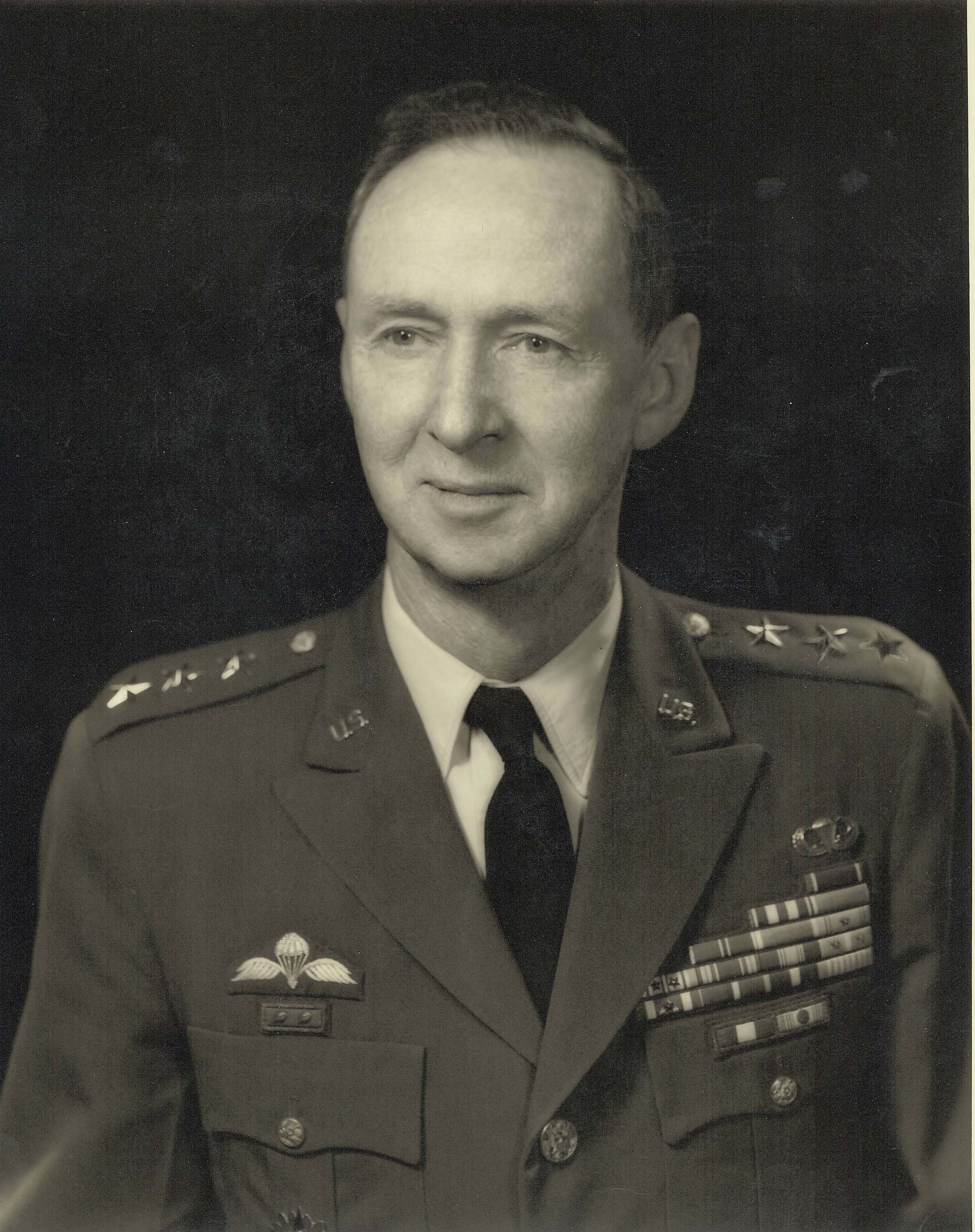
- Fitch in 1966
- Born: Alva Revista Fitch; September 10, 1907; Amherst, Nebraska, US
- Died: November 25, 1989 (aged 82); Washington, D.C., US
- Burial place: Arlington National Cemetery
- Military career
- Allegiance: United States
- Branch: United States Army
- Service years: 1930–1966
- Rank: Lieutenant general
- Commands: 3rd Armored Division Artillery
- Conflicts: World War II; Battle of Bataan (POW); Korean War
- Awards: Distinguished Service Cross; Distinguished Service Medal; Legion of Merit; Silver Star; Bronze Star

Alva Revista Fitch (September 10, 1907 – November 25, 1989) was a lieutenant general in the United States Army and was deputy director of Defense Intelligence Agency from 1964 to 1966. He commanded an artillery battalion during the Battle of Bataan and was a prisoner of war from 1942 to 1945. From October 16, 1961, to January 5, 1964, Fitch served as the assistant chief of staff for intelligence, Headquarters, Department of the Army.

== Early life ==
Born in Amherst, Nebraska, on September 10, 1907, son of Gertrude De La Barre and John Albert Fitch. Fitch was the first Eagle Scout in Nebraska, and one of the very earliest west of the Mississippi River. He graduated from Kearney High School and received an appointment to West Point, having been nominated by Nebraska senator Robert B. Howell.

== Junior officer ==
Fitch graduated from the United States Military Academy at West Point in June 1930 and became a second lieutenant in the Field Artillery. He was promoted to first lieutenant in September 1935 and served as aide-de-camp to Gen. Lesley J. McNair from 1937 to 1939.

== World War II ==
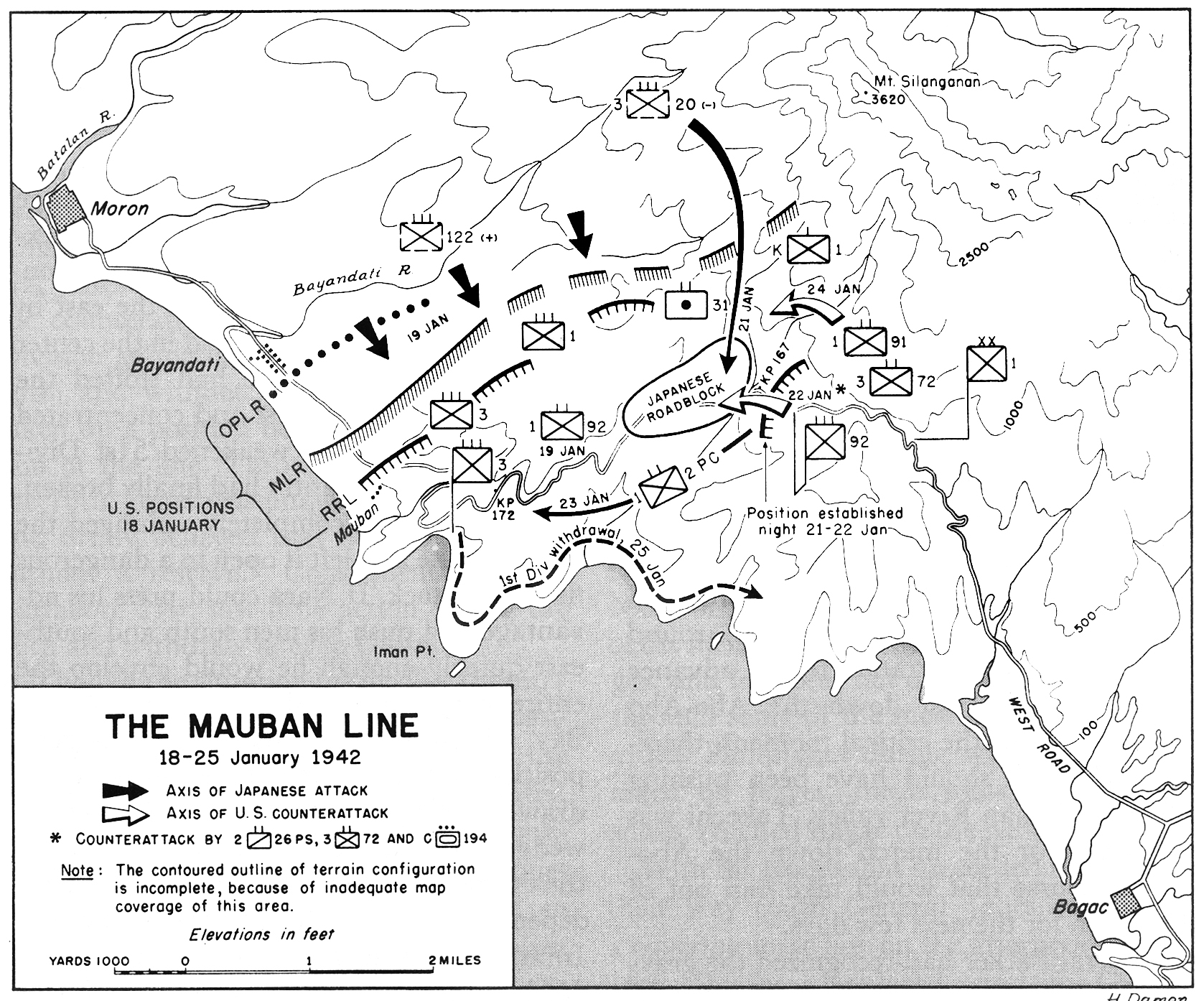
Fitch received the Distinguished Service Cross for using his 23rd Field Artillery troops to clear a coastal escape route for 1st Division forces cut off by a Japanese roadblock.

Fitch was sent to Fort Stotsenburg in the Philippines in February 1940 and He commanded Battery A of the 23rd Field Artillery Regiment, which was armed with horse and mule drawn QF 2.95-inch Mountain Guns. He was promoted to captain in June 1940.

After the invasion of the Philippines began on 8 December 1941, the 23rd Field Artillery was attached to the 26th Cavalry Regiment on December 13 and retreated with other units of I Corps to Bataan. Fitch was promoted to major in January 1942 and was put in command of the 71st Field Artillery when Colonel Halstead C. Fowler was wounded. Fitch received the Distinguished Service Cross for leading a battalion of artillery cut off by Japanese encirclement to remaining I Corp units south of Mauban. He was captured in May 1942 a few days after the surrender and taken prisoner.

A survivor of the Bataan Death March, he was held at Luzon at Camp O'Donnell. In December 1944 he was transferred with other Bataan survivors aboard the Ōryoku Maru to the Fukuoka prison camps. He was released in September 1945. He was awarded the Distinguished Service Cross and the Silver Star for heroism and courage in combat and while a captive of the Japanese.

== Post-war ==
From February to July 1946, he attended the Command and General Staff College at Fort Leavenworth, Kansas, and remained as an instructor until August 1947.

In the Korean War, Fitch was an artillery commander and then commanded the 3rd Armored Division Artillery. He later served as Chief of Staff of Army Intelligence before being named to the Defense Intelligence Agency post in 1964.

== Military intelligence ==
He served on the Army Aircraft Requirements Review Board, also known as the Rogers Board, which was established on January 15, 1960, by the Army Chief of Staff to review the Army Aircraft Development Plan and the related industry proposals. The Rogers Board's members included Major Generals Hamilton H. Howze, Thomas F. Van Natta III, Robert J. Wood, Richard D. Meyer, Ernest F. Easterbrook, and chairman Lieutenant General Gordon B. Rogers; and its results prefigured the more influential Howze Board on airmobility.

== Retirement and death ==
Fitch retired from active duty in 1966 and was military editor of the Kiplinger Newsletter from 1966 to 1975.

He died at Walter Reed Army Medical Center, Washington, D.C., on November 25, 1989, and was buried in Section 30 of Arlington National Cemetery. General Fitch is a member of the Military Intelligence Hall of Fame.

== Notable subordinates ==
General Fitch was Elvis Presley's commanding officer during the singer's stint in the army from 1958 to 1960.

Future U.S. Secretary of State Colin Powell was a lieutenant with the 3rd Armored Division under General Fitch.

== Gallery ==
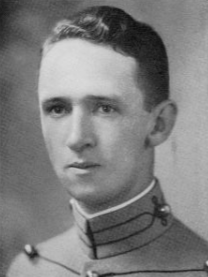
As a West Point cadet

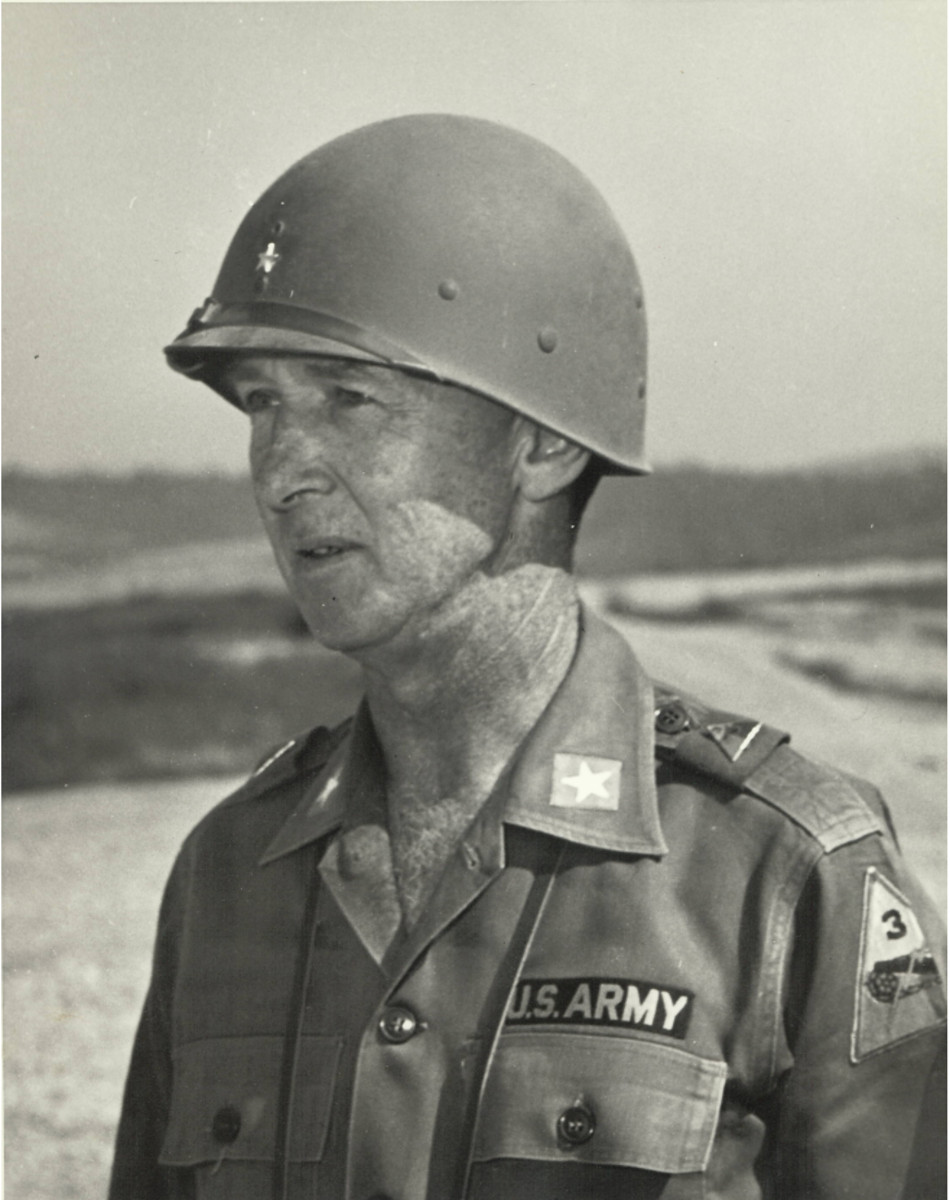
Brigadier General Alva R. Fitch, Division Artillery Commander of the 3rd Armored Division.

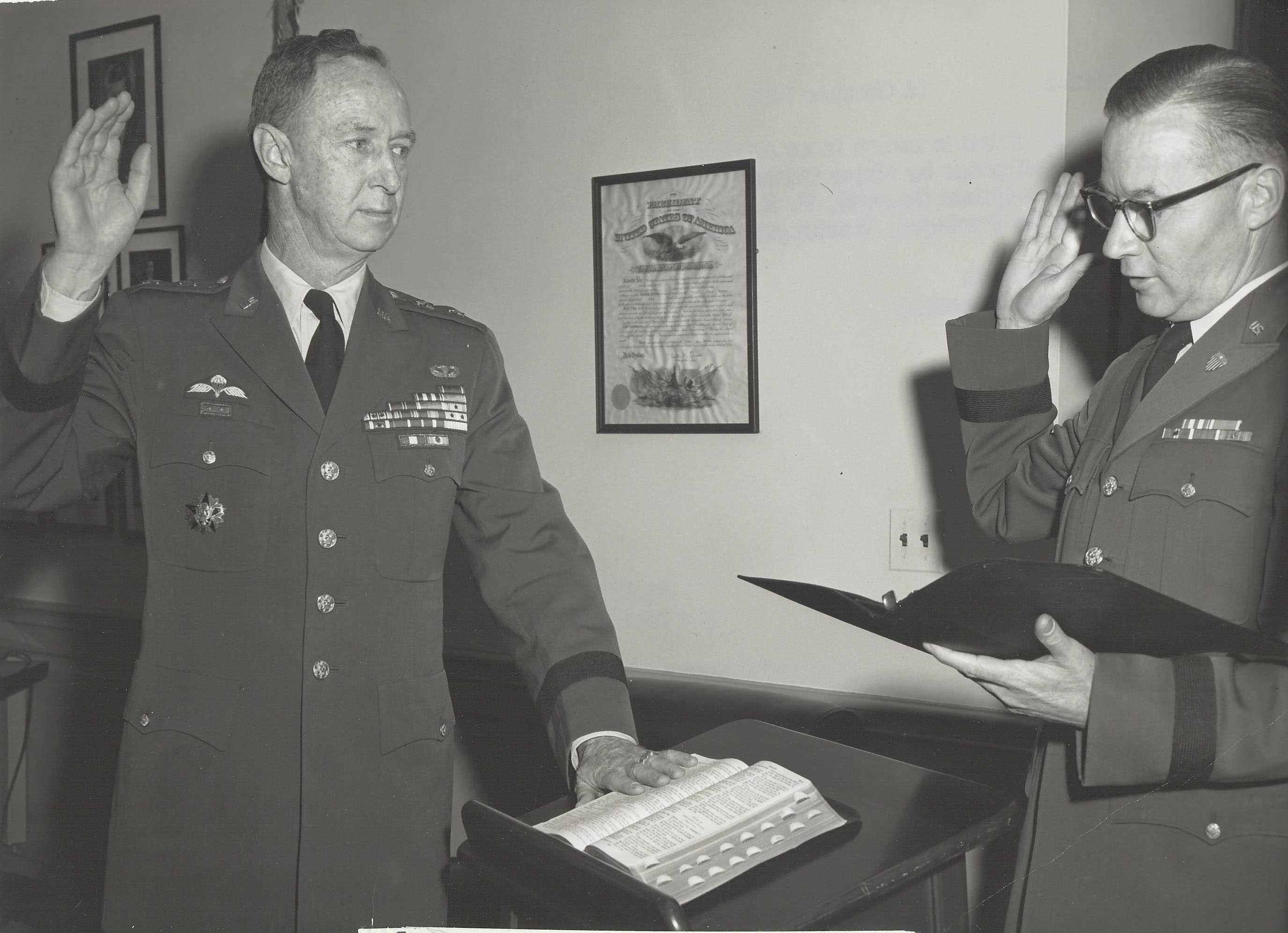
Fitch being sworn in as Assistant Chief of Staff for Intelligence by Maj. Gen. Joe C. Lambert at The Pentagon in 1961

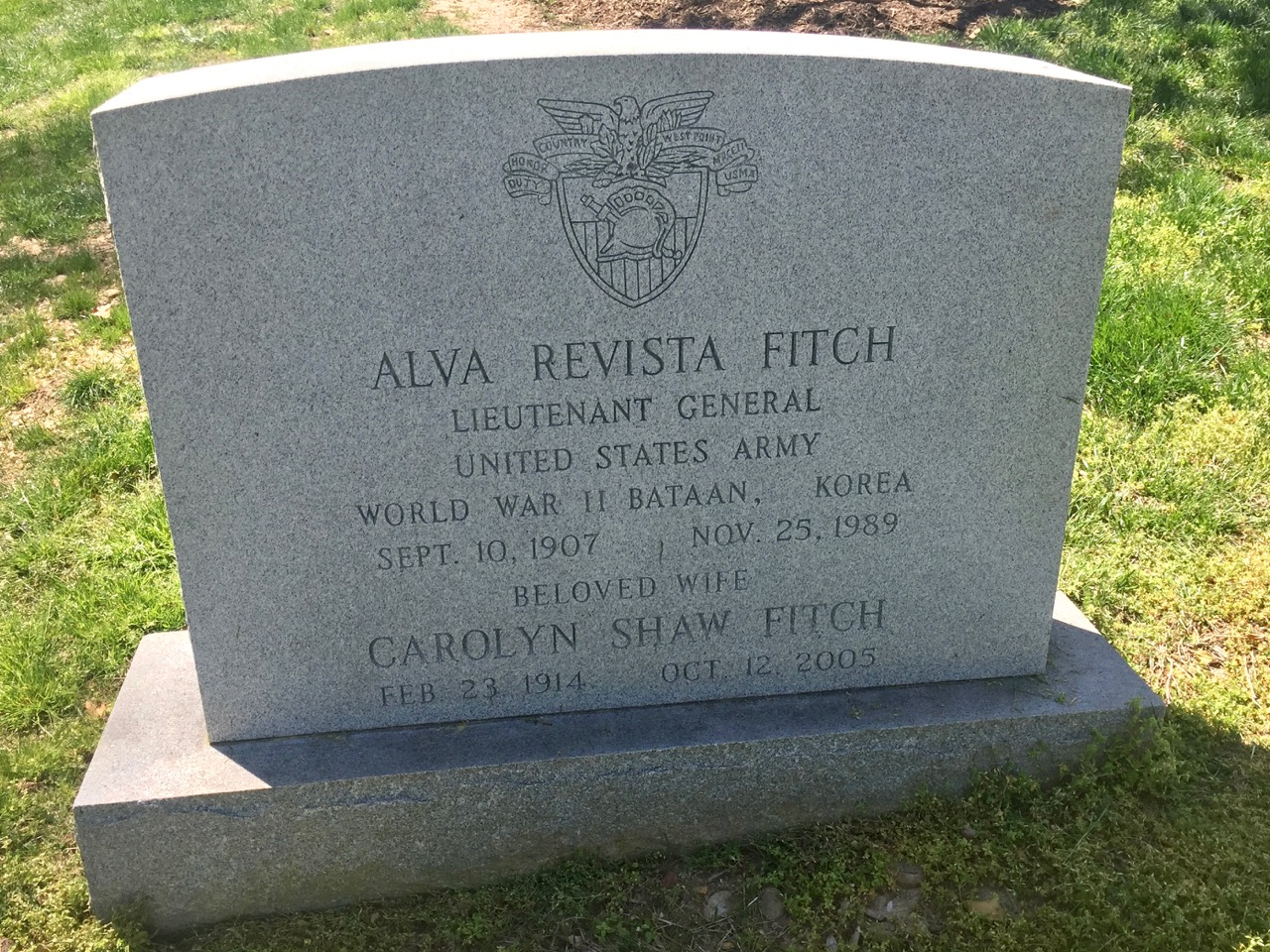
Grave site of Alva R. Fitch at Arlington National Cemetery

== See also ==
- 26th Cavalry Regiment

== Bibliography ==
- Black, J. K. (1977). United States Penetration of Brazil. Manchester University Press. pp. 183, 188. ISBN 978-0719006999.
- Fitch, A. R. (1984). Autobiography of Alva Revista Fitch. Fitch family genealogy collection, unpublished. p. 4.
- Mader, Julius (1968). Who's Who in the CIA. OCLC 14116.
- Newman, John M. (1992). JFK and Vietnam: Deception, Intrigue, and the Struggle for Power. Warner Books. pp. 33, 186. ISBN 978-0446516785.
- Powers, T. (1981). The Man Who Kept the Secrets. Pocket Books. p. 271. ISBN 978-0671836542.
