= North Luzon Force =

North Luzon Force (I Philippine Corps)
- Hukbong Hilagang Luzon
- Active: November 4, 1941 – April 9, 1942
- Countries: Commonwealth of the Philippines; United States
- Allegiance: United States Army
- Branch: Philippine Army; United States Army
- Type: Corps
- Role: Territorial Defense
- Size: 40,000
- Part of: Luzon Force; US Army Forces in the Philippines
- Garrison/HQ: Fort Stotsenburg
- Equipment: M1914 Pattern Bolt Action Rifles M1917 Enfield Bolt Action Rifles; M1903 Springfield .30 Caliber Bolt Action; M1 Garand Rifles; M1928 Thompson Submachineguns; M1918 155mm Howitzers; Canon de 155mm QF2.95inch Mountain Guns; M1A1 75mm Pack Howitzers; M1918 Browning Automatic Rifles; M1911 Colt .45 Pistols; M1917 Browning .30 Caliber Machineguns; M2 Browning .50 Caliber Heavy Machineguns M1935 37mm Carriage Guns
- Engagements: Philippines campaign (1941–1942); Battle of Bataan
- Decorations: US Presidential Unit Citation

Commanders
- Commanders: MGen. Albert M. Jones, USA; MGen. Jonathan Wainright IV, USA
- Deputy Commander: BGen. Edward P. King Jr.
- Chief of Staff: Col. William F. Maher, USA
- Operations G3: Col. Robert Hoffman, USA
- Supply G4: LCol. Gyles Merrill, USA
- Chief of Artillery: Col. Everett C. Williams, USA
- Chief of Engineers: Col. Harry A. Skerry, USA
- Notable commanders: Major General Jonathan Wainwright IV

Aircraft flown
- Bomber: B10/12 Medium Bombers; B17 Flying Fortress
- Fighter: P26 Boeing Peashooter P35 Seversky P40 Curtiss Warhawk

The North Luzon Force was a corps-sized grouping of the U.S.-sponsored Philippine Army, defeated in battle against the Japanese in 1941–42.

On November 4, 1941, United States Army Forces Far East (USAFFE) announced the creation of new commands to organize, train, and equip Philippine Army forces and US Philippine Department forces. The new commands are North Luzon Force (NLF), South Luzon Force (SLF), Visayan-Mindanao Force (VMF), and Harbor Defenses of Manila and Subic Bays under BGen. George F. Moore.

Initially BGen. Edward P. King Jr was selected as commander established his headquarters in Fort Stoltenberg in Angeles, Pampanga. However, as war was looming MGen. Jonathan Wainwright IV, replaced General King to command and he was given 11th Infantry Division under Col. (Later BGen) William Brougher, USA, 21st Infantry Division under BGen. Mateo Capinpin a native Filipino army officer, 31st Infantry Division under Col (Later BGen.) Clifford Bluemel, and 71st Infantry Division under Col. (Later BGen. Clyde Selleck). 71st Division could only be committed with direct permission by USAFFE Hq.).

War came in the Philippines on December 8, 1941, when Japanese bombed Clark Air Field and other military installations without warning. Combat units of the NLF was still partly assembled and trained. The equipment dated to the First World War, and the majority of the trainees has not fired a rifle due to lack of training facilities and ammunition.

Later additional units where added 26th US Cavalry Regiment (PS), 31st US Infantry Regiment the only all American personnel infantry unit and 88th US Field Artillery (PS). Also added are antiaircraft artillery units of recently arrived 200th US Coast Artillery (AA) Regiment a National Guard unit from New Mexico, US. Another unit was added before the start of the hostilities, 1st Provisional Light Tank Group composed by 192nd US Tank Battalion and 194th US Tank Battalion (Less Company C and D) equipped with M3 Stuart Light Tanks and M2 Half Tracks. 301st US Field Artillery under Col Edward Quintard was created locally and was equipped with M1918 155 mm Howitzers (Long Tom) and Canon de 155 mm guns found in the island but lacks the fire controls.

== Deployments ==
General Wainwright deployed his troops mainly near the Lingayen Gulf area expecting major landings in the area. 21st Infantry Division posted at the west coast of Lingayen Gulf and 11th Division at the eastern coast. Also, anticipating landings in Cagayan area where he posted a small unit to create token resistance. 26th US Cavalry and 94th Tank Battalion were stationed in the central plains. As a result, General Wainwright deployed his reserve force 71st Division of BGen Selleck along with the 26th US Cavalry Regiment of Colonel Pierce at Rosario to prevent them from going to Baguio the summer Capital of the Philippines. Tank Company of 194th Tank Company was also sent to support the opposing forces at Pozurrubio, but these forces weren't able to stop the Japanese from reaching Rosario where the junction to Baguio starts. As a result, 14th Infantry Regiment of 11th Division and a battalion of 71st Infantry, 71st Division who was posted in Baguio was cut off. As a result, General Wainwright decided that any defenses above Agno river was futile so he ordered them to withdraw below Agno river which General MacArthur approved.

== Withdraw to Bataan ==
Along the Bataan defensive line the NLF became the I Philippine Corps. MGen. Albert Jones took over the command when the command in the Philippines were restructured. MGen. Wainwright was promoted to Lieutenant General and took over command of forces in entire Philippines thus creating US Forces in the Philippines (USFIP). All Forces in Bataan was under MGen. Edward P. King Jr became Luzon Force making I Philippine Corps (NLF) and II Philippine Corps (SLF) its subordinate.

To prevent further annihilation of his battered and hungry troops, left General King surrendered his Luzon Force on April 9, 1942 to Japanese. His troops were forced to walked under the heat without very little food and water later known in what became known as the Death March. Many soldiers died from the 65 mile forced march and many atrocities occurred by the thousands.

=== Guerilla activities ===
Few months after surrender those units who were isolated and those refused to surrendered started guerilla campaign against the Japanese. New recruits and more joined when Filipino soldiers were released in September 1942 setting up several guerilla units, one of the more effective units was commanded by Colonel Martin Moses and later Colonel Russell Volckman.

== Order of Battle ==
- 11th Infantry Division (PA) – BGen. William E. Brougher, USA
- 21st Infantry Division (PA) – BGen. Mateo M. Capinpin, PA
- 31st Infantry Division (PA) – BGen. Clifford Bluemel, USA
- 71st Infantry Division (PA) – BGen. Clyde A. Selleck, USA
- US Provisional Light Tank Group – Colonel James R. N. Weaver, USA
- 26th US Cavalry (Motorized) Regiment – Colonel Clinton Pierce, USA
- 31st US Infantry Regimental Combat Team – Colonel Charles Steel, USA
- 200th US Coast Artillery (AA) Regiment – Colonel Charles Sage, USA
- 1/60th US Coast Artillery (AA)
- 86th US Field Artillery
- 803rd Engineer (Aviation) Battalion

== See also ==
- History of the Philippine Army
- US Army Forces in the Far East (USAFFE)
- Philippine Campaign
- Harbor Defenses of Manila and Subic Bays
