= 24th Field Artillery Regiment (United States) =

Philippine Scouts unit in 1922-1942

24th Field Artillery Regiment (Philippine Scouts)
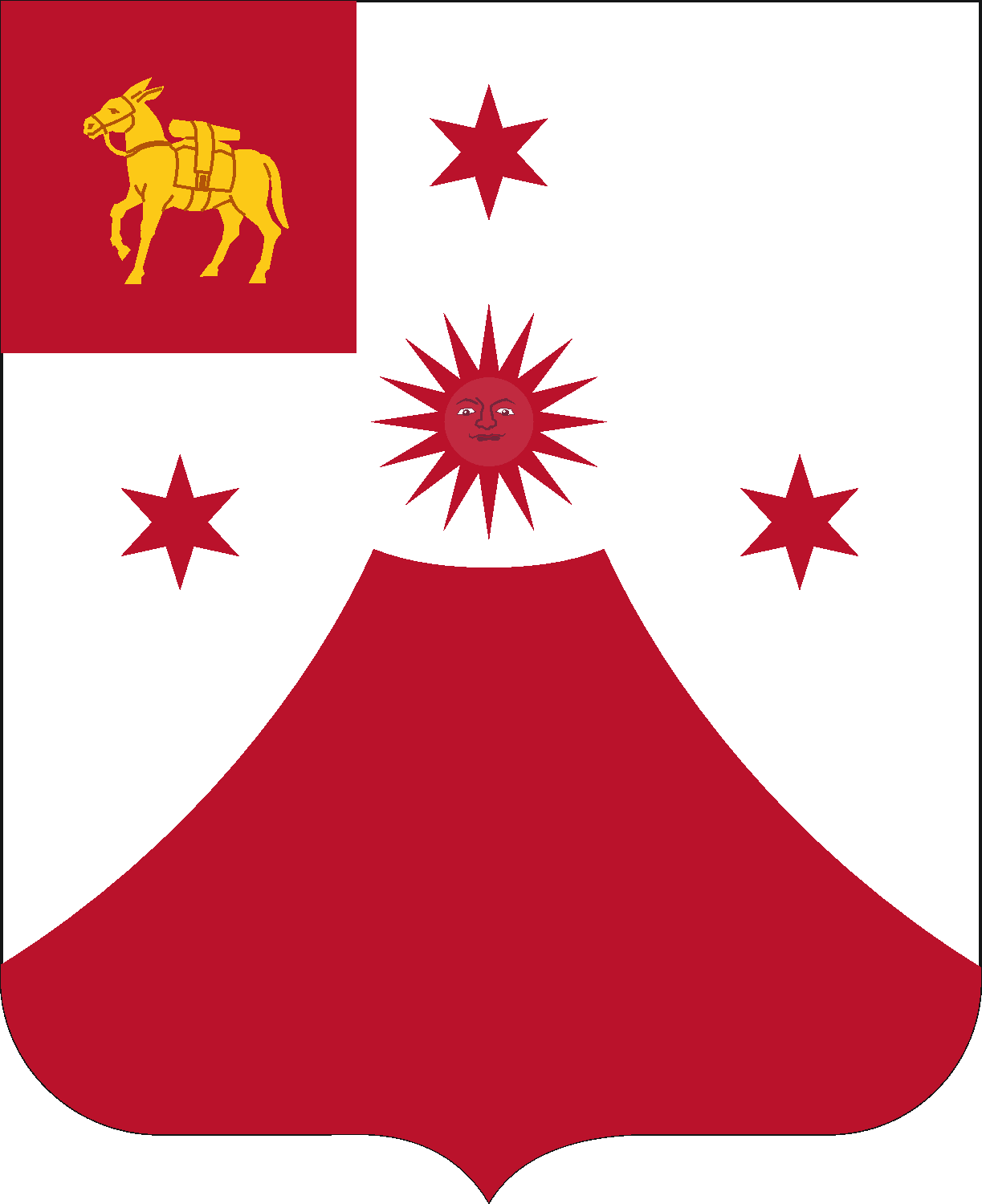
- Coat of arms
- Active: 1921–1942
- Country: United States
- Branch: Army
- Type: Field artillery
- Size: Two battalions
- Garrison/HQ: Fort Stotsenburg
- Motto: Crescit sub ponders Virtu (Virtue increases under a load)
- Engagements: World War II

Insignia
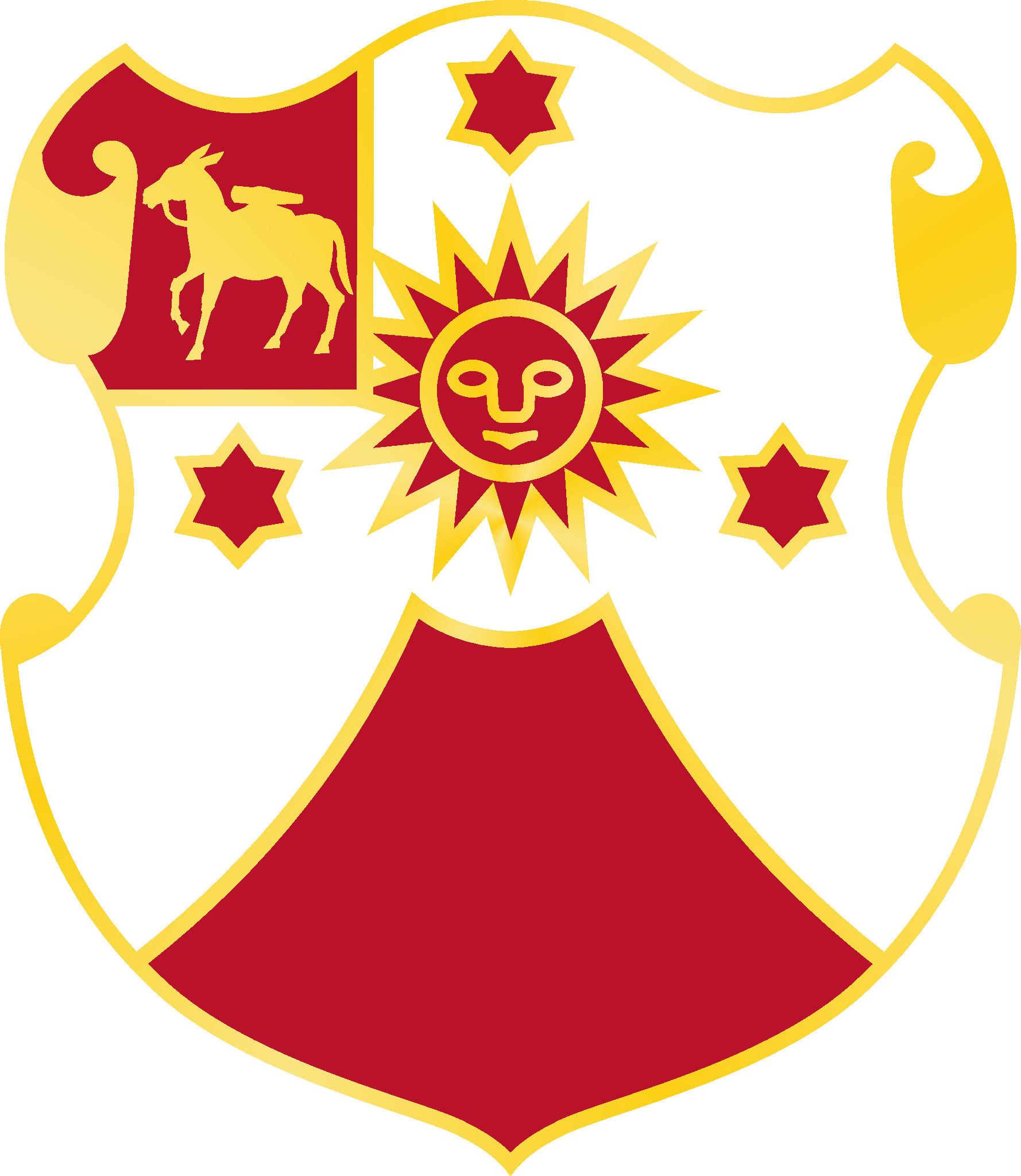
- Distinctive unit insignia

The 24th Field Artillery Regiment (Philippine Scouts) (24th FA (PS)) was a Philippine Scouts unit, part of the US Army's Philippine Division, formed in 1922 and active until April 1942. Antecedent units dated back to 1899.

== History ==
The 24th Field Artillery Regiment (Philippine Scouts) was constituted as a Regular Army unit on 22 December 1920, part of the Philippine Department. It was organized at Fort Stotsenburg on 15 May 1921 from the 1st Philippine Field Artillery Regiment (Provisional) (Mountain) and the 11th and 12th Infantry Battalions (Philippine Scouts) with the Philippine Division. Initially equipped with the 2.95-inch Mountain Gun, it converted to the truck-drawn 75 mm M1917 guns on 2 September 1931. During 1924 and 1925 it helped build a bridge over the Pinatubo River, and in the 1920s and 1930s also participated in the construction of an artillery trail from Fort Stotsenburg to the South China Sea via the Zambales Pass.

The 1st Philippine Artillery Regiment had been provisionally formed, in 1917, at Fort Stotsenburg, from the 11th and 12th Philippine Scout Battalions, by the United States 2nd Field Artillery Regiment (Mountain). The 11th and 12th Philippine Scout Battalions (12th PS) had been formed in the Philippines in 1901. They were primarily composed of men from various provisional infantry companies, of Philippine Scouts, formed in 1899. Both battalions were involved in combat at Samar, Mindanao, and Jolo.

By July 1941 the regiment, with two battalions of the now World War I-vintage 75 mm guns, along with the one battalion-23rd Field Artillery, formed the entire artillery support of the Philippine Division. On the last day of the month it had a strength of 843 – 904 Philippine Scouts enlisted men and 39 officers, five of whom were Philippine Scouts. During the Battle of the Philippines against the Japanese, the 24th FA participated in the withdrawal, on Luzon, to the Bataan Peninsula and the Battle of Bataan. In the Bataan defensive line set up in January 1942, the regiment's 1st Battalion provided direct artillery support to the 57th Infantry (Philippine Scouts), holding positions on the coastal road and the beach on Manila Bay on the right flank of the position. Two batteries of the battalion were emplaced near Abucay while the remaining battery was on the main defensive line. The regiment's 2nd Battalion, southeast of Abucay, provided additional artillery support to II Philippine Corps and the 41st Division. On the night of 11 January the regiment's guns replied to a Japanese artillery barrage that preceded an attack on the 57th Infantry's main line of resistance. The 24th surrendered in April 1942.

The regiment was awarded the Philippines Islands Campaign Streamer. It was officially disbanded on 25 March 1952.

Members of the 24th Field Artillery Regiment included Juan Reyes Fabia, Lieutenant General Edward H. Brooks, and Elias Coloma.

== Distinctive unit insignia ==
- Description

A Gold color metal and enamel device 1 1/4 inches (3.2 cm) in height consisting of a shield blazoned: Parti per chevron couped and concave Argent and Gules in chief a sun in splendor between three six-pointed mullets one and two all of the second, on a canton of the like a mule with mountain artillery pack Or (for the Second Field Artillery).

- Symbolism

The white portion of the shield is symbolic of the old Infantry alluding to the fighting of the scouts. The red charges refer to Artillery. The base is the outline of Mt. Arayat and the red six-pointed stars and sun are from the flag of the Philippine Insurrection. The canton with the yellow pack mule and mountain gun is from the arms of the Second Field Artillery.

- Background

The distinctive unit insignia was approved on 12 September 1923. It was rescinded on 21 April 1959.

== Coat of arms ==
- Blazon
  - Shield- Parti per chevron couped and concave Argent and Gules in chief a sun between three six pointed mullets one and two all of the second, on a canton of the like a mule with mountain artillery pack Or (for the Second Field Artillery).
  - Crest- None.
  - Motto- CRESCIT SUB PONDERE VIRTUS (Virtue Increases Under A Load).
- Symbolism
  - Shield- The white portion of the shield is symbolic of the old Infantry alluding to the fighting of the scouts. The red charges refer to Artillery. The base is the outline of Mount Arayat and the red six-pointed stars and sun are from the flag of the Philippine Insurrection. The canton with the yellow pack mule and mountain gun is from the arms of the Second Field Artillery.
  - Crest- None.
- Background- The coat of arms was approved on 27 July 1922. It was rescinded on 21 April 1959.

== Notable personnel ==
- Paul D. Phillips, assistant to Chief of Staff, G-2 and later G-3; moved up through staff and field positions while serving the Visayan Mindanao Force (1941-1942); former oldest living West Point graduate, retired as a Brigadier General.

== See also ==
- Field Artillery Branch (United States)
