= 71st Field Artillery Regiment (PA) =

Philippine army unit

- Active: August 1941 – April 1942
- Disbanded: April 9, 1942
- Countries: United States of America; Philippines
- Allegiance: United States Army; Philippine Army
- Branch: Army
- Type: Field Artillery
- Role: Fire Support
- Size: 1,500
- Part of: 71st Infantry Division
- Garrison/HQ: Camp Del Pilar, Pampanga; Camp Leon Kilat, Dumaguete, Negros Oriental
- Equipment: M1916 75mm Howitzers; QF 2.95inch Mountain Guns

Commanders
- Notable commanders: Lieutenant Colonel Halstead C. Fawler

Insignia
- Identification symbol

71st Field Artillery Regiment was a military unit of Philippine Army activated in 1941 as part of 71st Infantry Division. It fought in Luzon during Japanese landing and also in Bataan. All officers and men was captured during surrender of Fil-American forces in Bataan on April 9, 1942.

== Organization ==
The regiment was activated in Camp Leon Kilat in Dumaguete, Negros Oriental on August 28, 1941. All reserve for the regiment was called for active duty. It was inducted by Colonel Van Bonnet on September 1. It was ordered to transfer to Luzon and arrived in Camp Del Pilar in Pampanga and continued their training.

Major Halstead Fawler was appointed as regimental commander and Captain Carmelo Barbero as Executive Officer. Composing the regimental staff are 1Lieutenant Antonio San Agustin as both S2 & S3; 3Lieutenant John Lim as S4;

3Lieutenant Napoleon Nasal as Motor Officer, 3Lieutenant Isidro Gatmaitan, CO HQ Battery, 3Lieutenant Gregorio Katimbang, CO 1st Battalion, and 1Lieutenant Eriberto Ignacio, CO 2nd Battalion, and 2Lieutenant David Lopez, CO 3rd Battalion.

71st Infantry Division was designated as part of the reserve forces of the North Luzon Force under Major General Jonathan Wainwright only to be committed when approval is given by USAFFE Headquarters.

=== Retreat to Bataan ===
71st Infantry Division with supporting units was designated to put up a defense in Layac Junction in Dinalupihan, Bataan to give other units time to retreat to Bataan. 71st FA along with 71st and 72nd Infantry retreat towards south and given time to rest. However, Japanese tried to land in the southern tip of Bataan peninsula and Brigadier General Allan McBride sent 71st Division to crush Japanese landings. 71st Field Artillery provided fire support of its infantry and PC units.

=== Surrender ===
71st Field Artillery battered, hungry, lack ammunition, and although tired with strength dwelling due to casualties was still fighting. However, the order came to surrender as Major General King surrendered all his troops in Bataan.

== See also ==
- 71st Infantry Division
- Battle of Layac Junction
- Battle of Bataan
- North Luzon Force
