= Robert J. Wood =

United States Army general

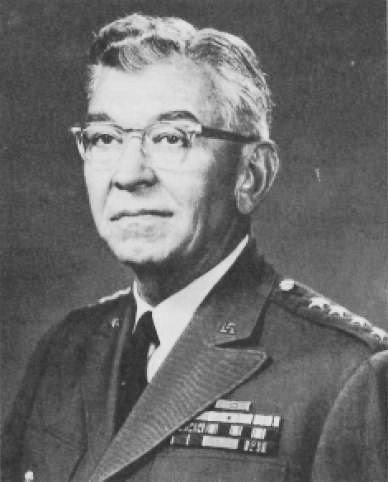
- Born: 9 June 1905; Petersburg, Virginia
- Died: 8 July 1986 (aged 81); Washington, D.C.
- Military career
- Allegiance: United States of America
- Branch: United States Army
- Service years: 1930–1965, 1968–1969
- Rank: General
- Commands: United States Army Air Defense Command
- Conflicts: World War II; Cold War
- Awards: Distinguished Service Medal; Legion of Merit (2); Purple Heart

Robert Jefferson Wood (9 June 1905 – 8 July 1986) was a United States Army four-star general who helped organize the creation of the North Atlantic Treaty Organization (NATO) military organization in the early 1950s and later served as director of the military assistance program from 1962 to 1965.

== Early career ==
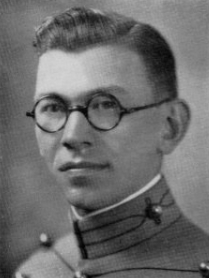
As a West Point cadet

Wood was born in Petersburg, Virginia. He attended Randolph-Macon College from 1925 until entering the United States Military Academy in 1926. Upon graduating on 12 June 1930, he was commissioned a second lieutenant in the Coast Artillery Corps.

During World War II, Wood served in the Mediterranean theater, advancing through the grades from captain to colonel. As a lieutenant colonel, he served in the G-3 section of the Fifth Army staff under Major General Alfred M. Gruenther, future NATO supreme commander. Following the war, he attended the National War College and served as a military aide to Secretary of Defense James Forrestal.

== NATO ==
In 1951, Wood was assigned to the Advanced Planning Group charged with creating Supreme Headquarters Allied Powers Europe (SHAPE), the NATO headquarters organization. The chief of the Advanced Planning Group was now-Lieutenant General Alfred Gruenther, who was still using Wood as his "personal dog robber", or staff troubleshooter, so Wood took the job of staff secretary as it seemed to them to be the best control point. "General Gruenther is an extremely able staff officer," Wood later observed. "I learned more about staff work in the 5th Army and SHAPE from him than I ever did at Leavenworth Command and General Staff School."

As staff secretary, Wood dealt with a diverse set of issues ranging from critical tasks such as helping the planning group organize itself while concurrently working out the nature and organization of the command as a whole, developing the necessary infrastructure, and transitioning the previous planning groups into the actual command headquarters organization; to comparatively trivial tasks such as devising the SHAPE logo and motto and rescheduling the SHAPE activation date to avoid April Fool's Day.

Following SHAPE's activation on 2 April 1951, Wood continued to serve as secretary of the staff at SHAPE headquarters until May 1952, when he was promoted to brigadier general and assigned as Chief of the Defense Annual Review Team for the U.S. Mission to NATO and the European Regional Organization (USRO). In July 1953, he was assigned as deputy defense advisor to the United States Ambassador to NATO in Paris, France.

== Senior positions ==
In January 1956 he was appointed deputy commanding general of the U.S. Army Antiaircraft Artillery and Guided Missile Center at Fort Bliss, Texas, and became commanding general of Fort Bliss and commandant of the Antiaircraft Artillery and Guided Missile School on 1 May 1956.

On 1 July 1957, Wood was assigned as the Army's Deputy Chief of Research and Development, working on a variety of projects including antimissile weapons and germ and gas warfare systems. He served on the Army Aircraft Requirements Review Board, also known as the Rogers Board, which was established on 15 January 1960, by the Army Chief of Staff to review the Army Aircraft Development Plan and the related industry proposals. The Rogers Board's members included Major Generals Hamilton H. Howze, Thomas F. Van Natta, Alva R. Fitch, Richard D. Meyer, Ernest F. Easterbrook, and chairman Lieutenant General Gordon B. Rogers; and its results prefigured the more influential Howze Board on airmobility.

In 1960, he was promoted to lieutenant general and assigned as commanding general of the Army Air Defense Command (ARADCOM) in Colorado Springs, Colorado, assuming command on 1 August 1960.

== Director of Military Assistance ==
On 1 September 1962, he succeeded General Williston B. Palmer as director of the military assistance program in the office of the Assistant Secretary of Defense for International Security Affairs, with rank of full general. The Director of Military Assistance supervised the operational details of arms transfer to NATO allies and other friendly countries, as guided by the State Department. As chief of staff of the foreign military aid program, he was considered to be on the same level as the chiefs of staff of the Army, Navy, and Air Force and of comparable military rank, but without a seat on the Joint Chiefs of Staff. When Wood retired, the position was downgraded to three stars and eventually its title was changed to deputy assistant secretary of defense (international security affairs) for military assistance and sales.

== Retirement ==
Wood retired on 1 September 1965, but was recalled to active duty on 1 February 1968, to serve as Director of the Overseas Base Requirements Study Group, a special interdepartmental study group planning future overseas military base locations. Upon completion of this assignment, he returned to the retired list on 31 March 1969. He subsequently served on a presidential task force on international development and consulted for the Research Analysis Corporation in McLean, Virginia.

He married the former Sarah Thomas on 4 September 1930. He died on 8 July 1986, and was survived by his wife and one daughter.

His awards and decorations include the Distinguished Service Medal, Legion of Merit (2), and the Purple Heart. He attended the Coast Artillery School, the Command and General Staff School, the Armed Forces Staff College, and the National War College.
