= Halstead C. Fowler =

United States Army colonel

Halstead Clotworthy Fowler
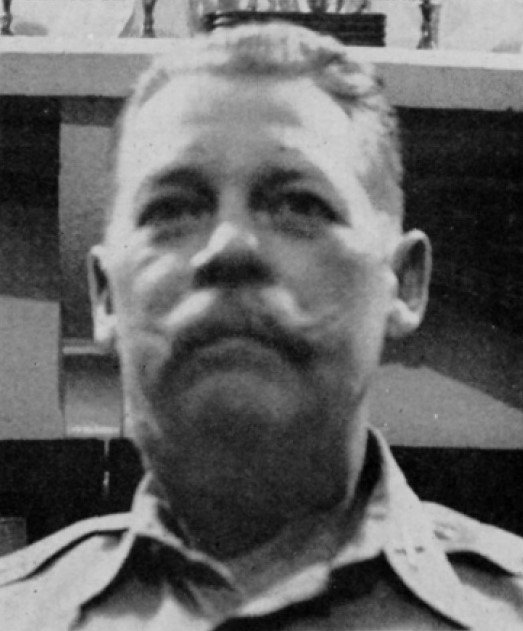
- Born: 19 April 1899; Brooklyn, New York
- Died: 7 September 1950 (aged 51); Afton, Virginia
- Burial place: Arlington National Cemetery
- Military career
- Allegiance: United States
- Branch: United States Army
- Service years: 1920–1946
- Rank: Colonel
- Nickname: Chick
- Commands: 71st Field Artillery
- Conflicts: Lingayen Gulf; Bataan; Death March
- Memorials: Distinguished Service Cross (2); Silver Star; Purple Heart (3); Prisoner of War Medal

Halstead Clotworthy Fowler (19 April 1889 – 7 September 1950) was a colonel in the United States Army. He commanded the 71st Field Artillery during the Philippines campaign (1941–1942) and was multiply decorated. He was a survivor of the Bataan Death March and prisoner of war.

== Early life ==
Halstead Fowler was born in 1899 in Brooklyn, New York to Halstead Parker Fowler and Carrie Haines Fowler. His father was an architect and a captain in the New York National Guard. After his father died, he moved to Charleston, South Carolina where he attended high school and the College of Charleston for one year before transferring to West Point in 1918, graduating in 1920.

== Early military career ==
Fowler spent two and a half years in the 61st Antiaircraft Battalion at Fort Monroe before being sent to the Philippines in 1923. He returned to Fort Sill in the United States and transferred to the field artillery at Fort Benjamin Harrison. He attended the Command and General Staff School at Fort Leavenworth and then was an Assistant Professor of Military Science and Tactics at Ohio State University.

== Invasion of the Philippines ==
Fowler returned to the Philippines in October 1941 as a major and soon thereafter a lieutenant colonel, commanding the 71st Field Artillery of the Philippine Army. Fowler's unit fought a delaying action after the Japanese invasion of Lingayen Gulf and retreated south to the Bataan peninsula. For his actions at the Agno River, Luzon in December 1941 and northern Bataan in January 1942, he was awarded the Distinguished Service Cross twice.

He was wounded three times in four weeks between December 1941 and January 1942 and then captured after the surrender.

== Prisoner of war ==
Fowler survived the Bataan Death March and was held prisoner at the Bilibid prisoner of war camp. He never fully recovered from his wounds and loss of eyesight during captivity and retired as a colonel on 30 September 1946.

== Later life ==
Fowler had married Margaret "Tykie" Adams, the daughter of Brigadier General William K. Naylor and mother of Fowler's three stepchildren, in 1938. After his retirement, they lived on a farm in Afton, Virginia and he died there on 7 September 1950. He was buried at Arlington National Cemetery on 11 September 1950.

== See also ==
- 71st Division (Philippines)
- Alva R. Fitch
