= Clyde A. Selleck =

American Army officer

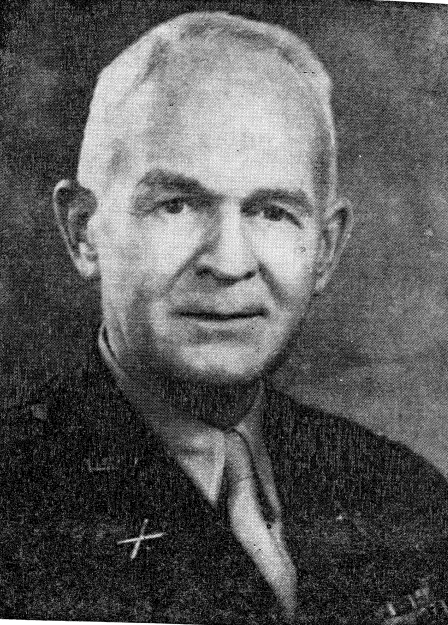
- Born: 29 July 1888; Brandon, Vermont
- Died: 9 January 1973 (aged 84); Silver Spring, Maryland
- Military career
- Branch: United States Army
- Service years: 1910–1947
- Rank: Colonel
- Nickname: Pappy
- Commands: 71st Division (Philippines); 83rd Field Artillery Regiment; I Corps Artillery (Acting); Battalion, 21st Field Artillery
- Conflicts: World War I; World War II; ● Battle of Bataan
- Awards: Purple Heart

Signature
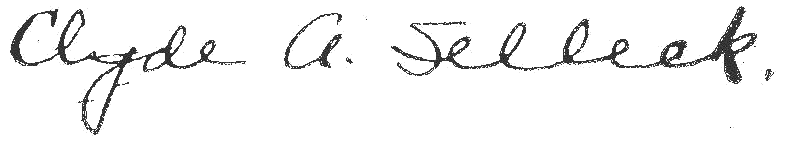

Clyde Andrew Selleck Sr. (29 July 1888 – 9 January 1973) was a United States Army officer. During World War II, he commanded the 71st Division during the Philippines campaign and then spent more than three years as a prisoner of war after surrendering at Bataan in April 1942.

== Early life and education ==
Selleck was born in Brandon, Vermont and raised in nearby Rutland. After studying at Norwich University for a year, he entered the United States Military Academy in June 1906. Selleck graduated in June 1910 and was commissioned as a second lieutenant of field artillery. He subsequently graduated from the School of Fire for Field Artillery in June 1913. Selleck later graduated from the Field Artillery School advanced course in June 1926, the Command and General Staff School in June 1927 and the Army War College in June 1935.

== Military career ==
After commissioning, Selleck served with the 1st Field Artillery at Fort Sill in Oklahoma and Schofield Barracks in Hawaii. He then taught chemistry at the Military Academy from August 1913 to June 1916. Selleck was promoted to first lieutenant in July 1916 and captain in May 1917.

During World War I, Selleck received a temporary promotion to major in February 1918 before being sent to France with the 5th Division. He briefly served as a battalion commander with the 21st Field Artillery in August 1918. Selleck received a temporary promotion to lieutenant colonel in September 1918 and served as chief of staff of the VII Corps Artillery until November 1918. He then served as chief of staff and acting commander of the I Corps Artillery until January 1919.

After the war, Selleck taught at the School of Fire from July 1919 to December 1920. He reverted to captain in March 1920 before being permanently promoted to major in July 1920. Selleck served as a field artillery instructor with the New York National Guard from July 1921 to August 1925.

Selleck was assigned to the Militia Bureau in Washington, D.C. from June 1927 to June 1931. He then served as commanding officer of the 83rd Field Artillery at Fort Benning in Georgia from June 1931 to June 1934. Selleck was promoted to lieutenant colonel in October 1934 and colonel in April 1939.

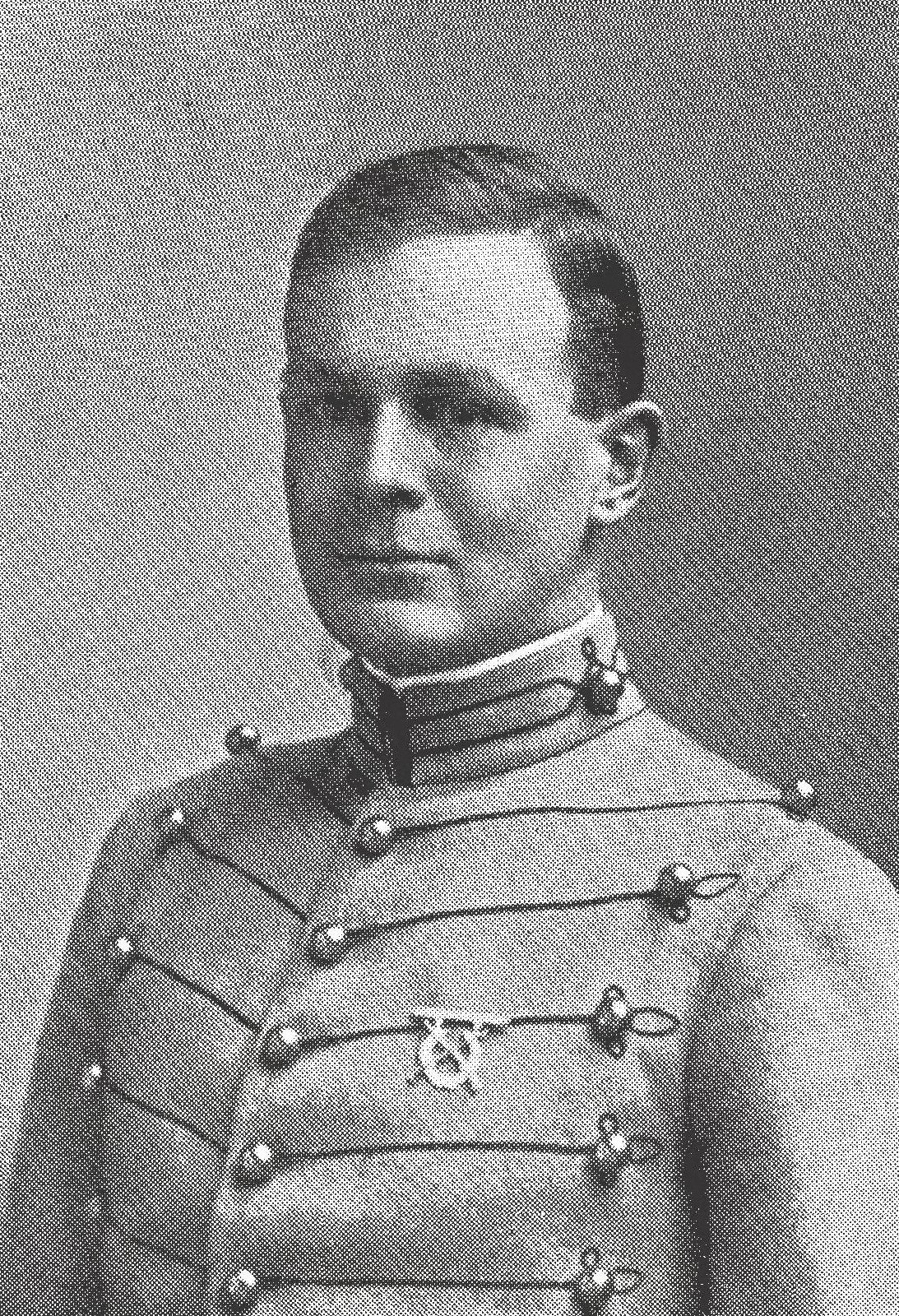
Clyde Selleck as Cadet at USMA in 1910.

Selleck was sent to the Philippines in October 1941 and he was assigned as instructor at the Philippine Army Command and General Staff School at Baguio. He assumed command of the 71st Division in November after its transfer in Luzon from Negros. After the Japanese invasion in December, he received a temporary promotion to brigadier general and moved his division north as reserve of General Wainwright's North Luzon Force. Few of units was used to cover withdrawal in Pangasinan.

=== Layac Junction ===
After General MacArthur's order to activate WPO-3 a general retreat of all forces in the north Luzon and south Luzon to Bataan. To cover this retreat his division was assigned in Layac Junction the gateway to Bataan. Attached with artillery and combat units he tried to delay Japanese advance to Bataan but the superior force of 48th Division force him to withdraw as his division along with attached units are being annihilated. His was posted at the rear at Service Area Command to serve as reserve and get some rest.

=== Battle of Points ===
When Japanese attempted to land in the west coast of Bataan his division was ordered to move forward to meet these landings and boot the Japanese out. After an additional month of combat, Selleck was relieved of command in January 1942 due to unsatisfactory report of General MacArthur's staff on his division performance at battle of Points, did not consider the state of his division who were tired, weak, and lack of arms. After relief he was reduced in rank to colonel and reassigned as chief of staff, Service of Supply. After being captured, Selleck survived the Bataan Death March and then was held in prisoner-of-war camps until August 1945.

After returning to the United States, Selleck was assigned to the National Guard Bureau in June 1946. He unsuccessfully applied to be reinstated as a brigadier general. Selleck retired from active duty as a colonel on 30 April 1947.

== Personal ==
Selleck was the son of Andrew and Jennie (Barber) Selleck.

Selleck married Gertrude Troth (30 April 1893 – 21 August 1964) on 15 August 1923. They had two daughters and a son. Their son Clyde Andrew Selleck Jr. (23 December 1930 – 12 May 2016) was a 1952 West Point graduate who retired from the Army Corps of Engineers as a colonel.

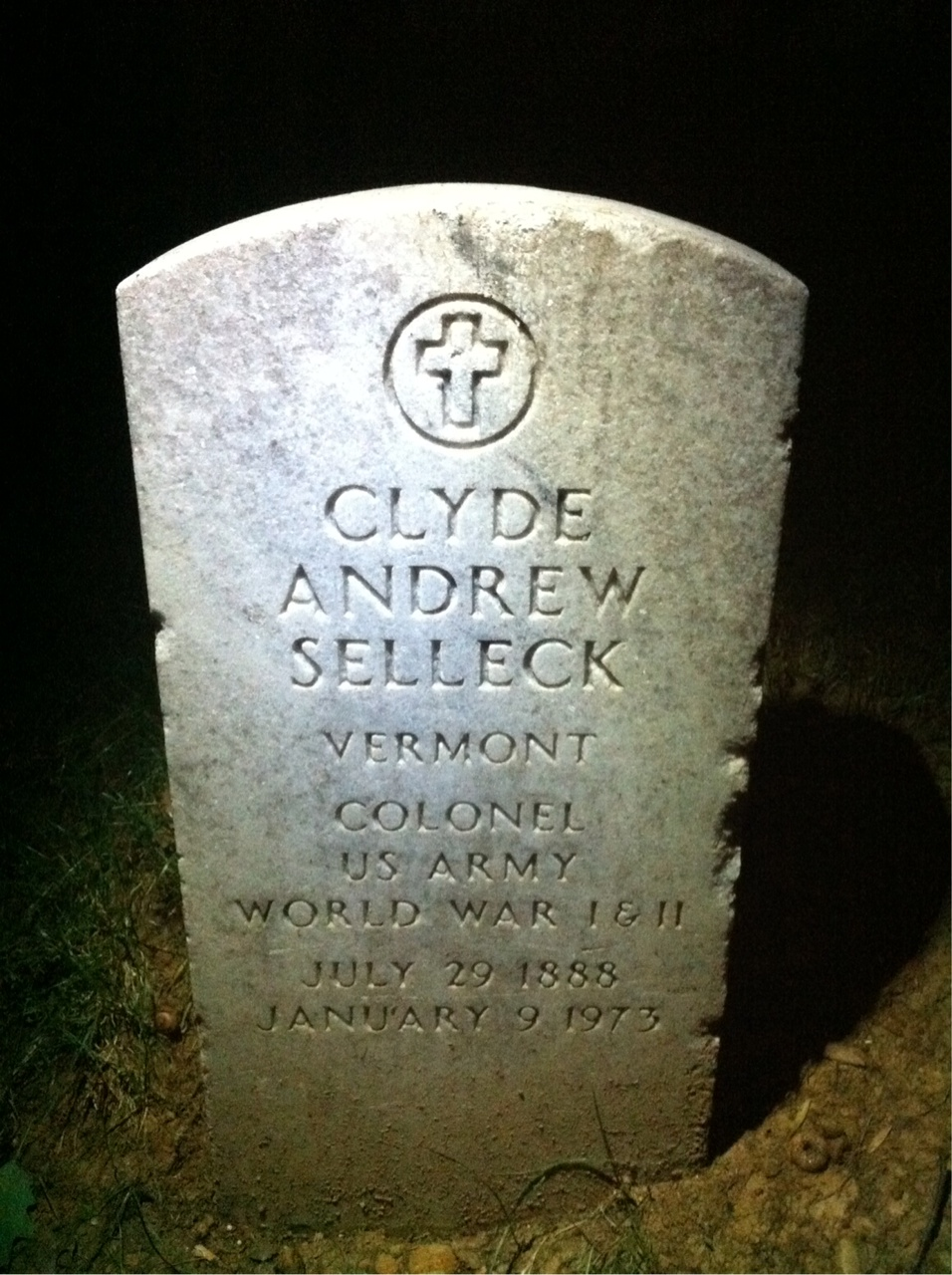
Colonel Selleck's grave at Arlington National Cemetery.

After his 1947 retirement, Selleck and his wife lived in Alexandria, Virginia. He died at a nursing home in Silver Spring, Maryland and was interred next to his wife at Arlington National Cemetery on 11 January 1973.
