= Fort Stotsenburg =

Historic location in Angeles City

- Barrio Sapang Bato, near Angeles City in Philippines
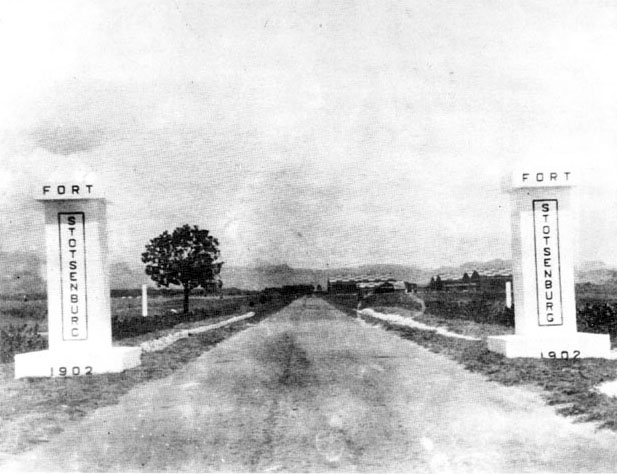
- The Gateposts of Fort Stotsenburg, as seen between 1919-1941

Site information
- Type: Fort
- Condition: Ruined

Site history
- Built: 1902
- Battles/wars: World War II

Garrison information
- Garrison: 26th Cavalry Regiment

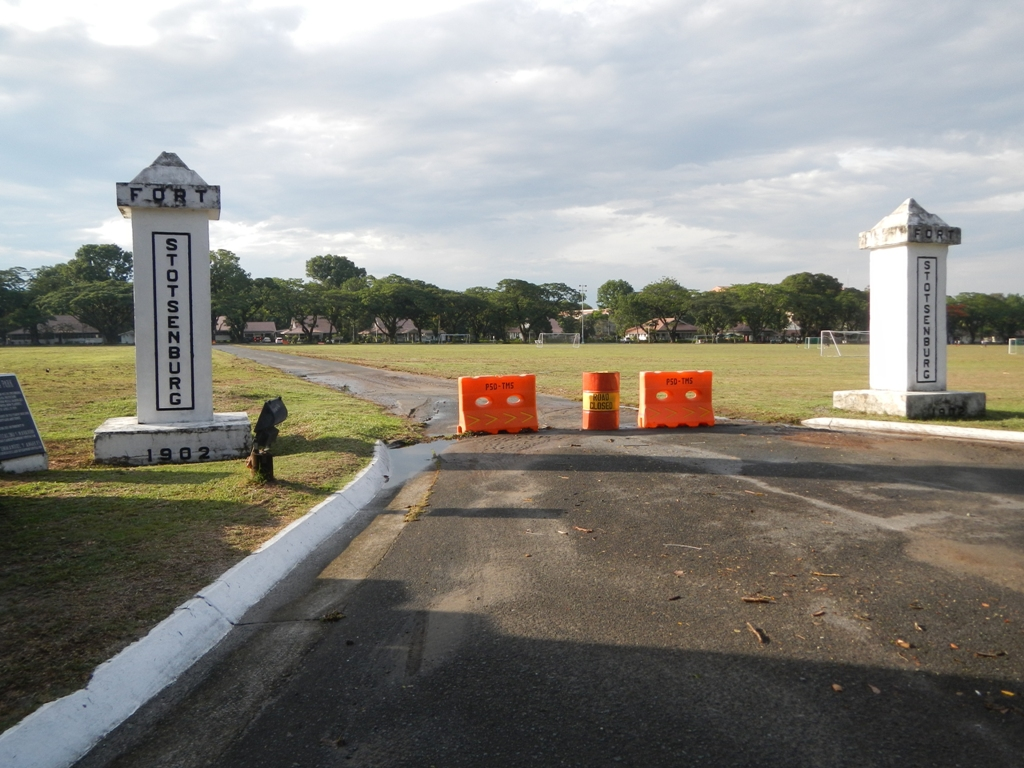
The Gatesposts of Fort Stotsenburg in 2015

Fort Stotsenburg, during the World War II era, was the location of the Philippine Department's 26th Cavalry Regiment (PS), 86th Field Artillery Battalion, and 88th Field Artillery Regiment; along with the Philippine Division's 23rd and 24th Field Artillery Regiments. Also based here were the 12th Ordnance Company and a platoon of the 12th Quartermaster Regiment.

Fort Stotsenburg is situated in Sapang Bato, Angeles City and is approximately 80 km north of Manila. This was one of the locations where, under the National Defense Act of 1935, field artillery training was conducted. It was named after Colonel John M. Stotsenburg, a Captain of the Sixth U.S. Cavalry, and a Colonel of the First Nebraska Volunteers who was killed while leading his regiment in action near Quingua, Bulacan, the Philippines on April 23, 1899.

c.1917, Fort Stotsenburg was home to the 1st Philippine Artillery Regiment.

== Origins ==
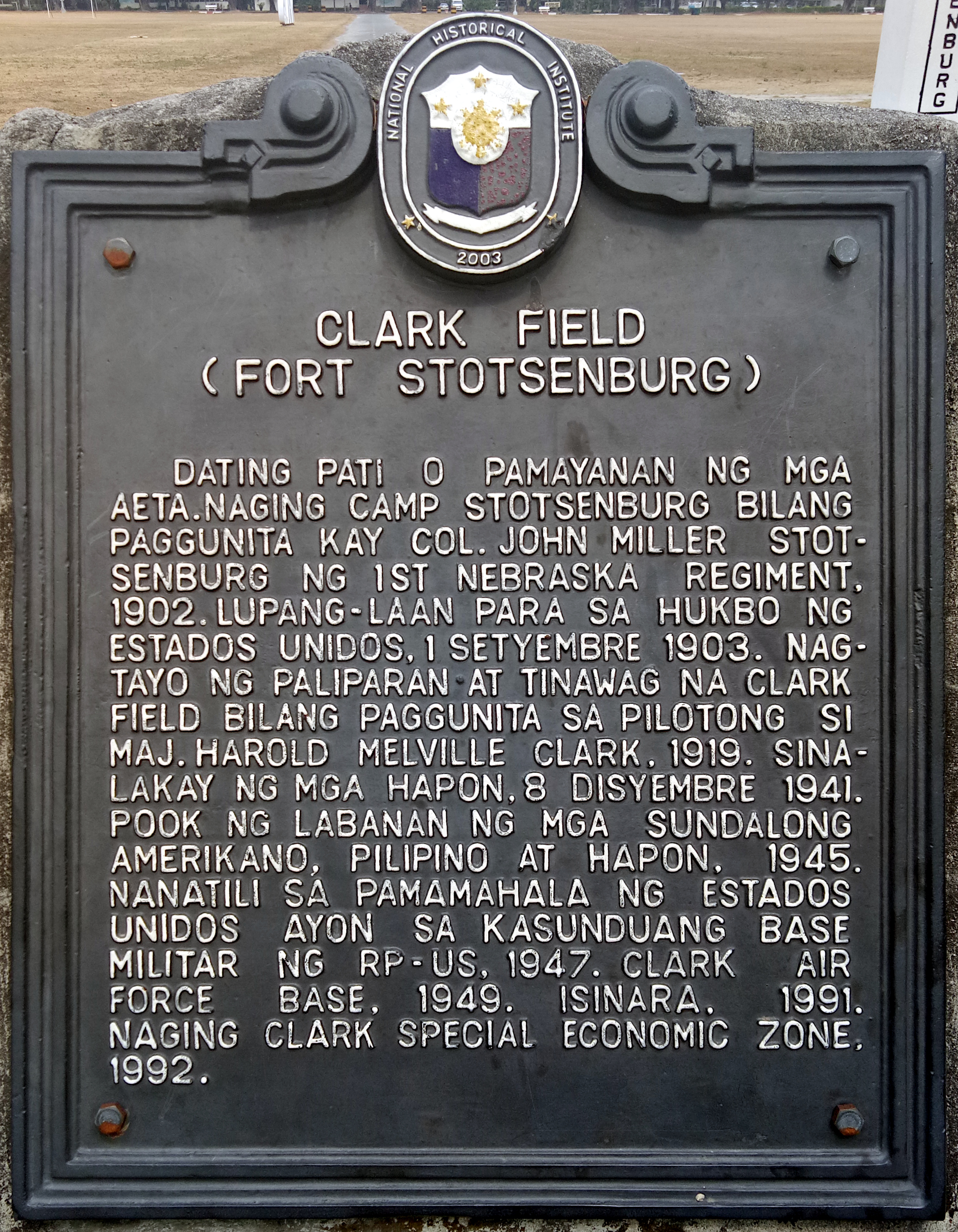
Philippine historical marker installed at the site in 2003

By October 1902, American forces had established more or less permanent quarters near the Angeles railroad station in an area of the town known as Talimundoc (now the barangay of Lourdes Sur). The rumor is that cavalry foragers had come across a fertile plain further to the north and that sweet grass was abundant in this area. The U.S. cavalry forces had encountered problems caused by the fact that their horses became sick and often died after eating Philippine "sawgrass."

By the latter part of 1902, plans were under consideration to relocate the American military reservation to this area near the barrio of Sapang Bato. The preliminary survey dates from 1902. In the following year, President Theodore Roosevelt signed an executive order, establishing Fort Stotsenburg in the location later occupied by Clark Air Base.

=== Impact on Indigenous communities ===
The establishment of the US bases in the Philippines, particularly of Fort Stotsenberg, Clark Airfield, Subic Bay, and John Hay, frequently resulted in the displacement and disenfranchisement of the Aeta and Ibaloi indigenous peoples who lived in the land, at a time when they were already facing pressures from the incursions of civilian lowlanders. None of these indigenous peoples were properly compensated at the time the bases were established, and they remain marginalized and unable to return to their historic lands today.

== Facilities and structures ==
=== Gateposts ===
The entrance pillars to Fort Stotsenburg were originally located on what is now known as Dau Highway. During the Japanese occupation of Clark Air Base from 1942 to 1945, Imperial forces used these pillars for fill material during their repairs to the base runway. They were unearthed intact in the vicinity of the old Base Operations Building in 1965. Following their discovery, the original pillars were relocated near the Consolidated Base Personnel Office, which at that time served as the on-base American Legion Post.

In 1984, as part of an overall plan to highlight the base's long history, the 13th Air Force History Office received permission to move the gateposts once again. Because putting them at their original site would have placed them in an area which possessed low visibility, it was decided to install them on the southern boundary of the parade ground instead. Special crews and a giant crane rented from a company in Manila moved the posts in what turned out to be an all-day affair. Quite a number of onlookers viewed the move and cheered as the last post was dropped into its new position.

=== Parade Ground West End, Thirteenth Air Force Area ===
The post flagpole has always been in its present location in front of Building 2122 with the original flagstaff constructed on September 16, 1906, at a cost of $220. It was the location for reveille at 6 a.m.; a cannon was fired at 5 p.m. for retreat ceremonies; and taps was sounded at 10 p.m. In accordance with the provisions of the Military Bases Agreement as revised in 1979, the flagpole became the only one upon which the American flag could be displayed. In March 1984, at Major General Kenneth D. Burn's request, the Government of the Philippines amended this provision to allow another U.S. flag to be flown at the site of the joint US/Philippine Cemetery, near the Main Gate of Clark Air Base.

=== Camp gymnasium ===
The camp gymnasium was completed in 1912 and this building has been used for many purposes over the years, including Post Exchange and "Charlie Corn's Canteen." It last housed the offices of the Thirteenth Air Force Chief of Staff for Operations and Intelligence and the 6200th Tactical Fighter Training Group.

=== Parade Ground, West End, Building 2125 ===
This building, which last housed the Thirteenth Air Force's Deputy Chief of Staff for Operations and Intelligence and the 6200th Tactical Fighter Training Group, responsible for Cope Thunder Exercises, originally was completed in 1913. In the early decades of Fort Stotsenburg's history, it housed Charlie Corn's canteen and restaurant in the basement, the post exchange on the first floor and the post theater on the second floor. Following the American recapture of Clark in February 1945, it served as the Fifth Air Force Headquarters building. Years of renovation and modification have all but disguised the original structure, which originally possessed an open portico.

=== Post Commander's office ===
The first building on this site was made of nipa and bamboo in 1902 and served as post headquarters. In 1906, it was rebuilt of lumber and roofed with tarpaper. It was reconstructed of concrete in 1912 and, for a time, housed a bowling alley. Throughout most of its history, this building served as the office of post commanders and their executive officers, even during the Japanese occupation.

=== Parade Ground, West End, Building 2127 ===
Constructed between 1912 and 1913, Building 2127 originally served as barracks for enlisted personnel from cavalry and field artillery units. Its most famous occupants were the Philippine Scouts of the 26th Cavalry, who lived there at the time of the outbreak of World War II. This massive structure last housed the Air Force Office of Special Investigation on the first floor, the Central Civilian Personnel Office on the second floor, and the Deputy Chief of Staff for Logistics along with the Pacific Air Forces Contracting Center on the third floor. A similar barracks, constructed at the same time, preserves more of the original character of these buildings. It is located just down Austin Street and housed the Base Social Actions function and the offices of the general educational institutions.

=== Telephone Exchange (Building 2425) ===
Directly across Weston Avenue from the old 26th Cavalry(PS) barracks stands this small structure that was constructed in November 1914 at a cost of only $260. During its long history, Building 2425 sometimes served as a post office facility, but for most of its life has housed Clark's telephone operations office, as it last did. During the battle for Clark in late January 1945, this building sustained a number of hits. Despite a number of renovations, these hits on the building have been left uncovered as testimony to the ferocity of the fighting.

=== Old Railway Station (Building 2697) ===
The Manila-Dagupan Railway line was once the most efficient ways of traversing the island of Luzon. This rail line passed right through what before 1979 was the Clark Air Base Military Reservation, and for many years, the most efficient method of travel between Fort Stotsenburg and Manila was by train. Arrivals and departures were gala occasions, marked by the presence of crowds and bands at the Fort Stotsenburg terminal. After World War II, this means of travel lessened significantly and the use of this facility as a passenger terminal was discontinued. It last housed the television studios of Detachment 1, Air Force Pacific Broadcasting Squadron's Far East Network-Philippines.

=== Officers' Row ===
Almost since the beginning, Fort Stotsenburg's Wirt Davis Avenue, which borders the Parade Ground to the north, has been known by this name. This Avenue was home to the quarters of the Commander of the Thirteenth Air Force from 1946 until the Americans vacated the base in 1991. A similar structure, but somewhat smaller, serves as the quarters for the Clark Air Base Command Deputy Commander. Other concrete homes in this area served as the quarters for Thirteenth's Vice Commander and other key subordinate unit personnel. The balance of the homes along this row are "barns." The concrete quarters were constructed around 1910 and 1913 and the trees also date from this period. The trees are acacia (monkeypod) and were over 25 years old in 1939.

=== U.S. Facility Commander's Residence ===
The original building, which was made of wood with corrugated iron roofing, was erected at the beginning of the 20th century. The present concrete structure was completed on November 26, 1910, at a cost of $10,901.25. It was called Field Officers' Quarters, but some post commanders had an office on the first floor in addition to their offices in Building 2121. During the Japanese occupation, Japanese staff officers used the building for offices and housing. Major General Eugene L. Eubank, Thirteenth Air Force Commander from July 1946 to October 1948, was the first to occupy this building after its re-designation as the General's Family Quarters in August 1946.

=== Old Houses along the parade ground ===
Although some were built as early as 1903, all the houses along Wirt Davis Avenue, originally called Officers' Row, were completed by 1904. The original cost per house was $1,309.90. The distinctive construction allowed cooling breezes to pass under the raised floor and through the wide, screened verandas, while the steep, metal roofs dissipated trapped heat and allowed a rapid run-off of the heavy rains. All flooring was made from Oregon pine, imported to the Philippines. The huge trees shading the houses are acacia and were planted at the time of construction.

Similar houses were constructed as late as 1931 on the three parallel streets behind Davis Avenue. On the opposite side of the Parade Ground were large open areas surrounding troop barracks, blacksmith shops, house corrals and stables.

As a whole, the buildings still stand as some of the best-preserved examples of U.S. military tropical construction. The Thirteenth Air Force has decreed these historic structures, especially the ones along Davis Avenue, to be preserved. The "barns" were highly sought after for officer/civilian housing because of their size, coolness, and history.

=== Post Commander's residence ===
At the midpoint of Davis Avenue stands a "barn" that used to serve as the Post Commander's residence prior to World War II. This building was differentiated from the rest of the officers' quarters along the Parade Ground by two red posts flanking the stairs. A persistent myth has it that each morning two horses would be hitched to these posts, so that the commander could select his mount for the day. The building's central location was considered to be a position of prestige, a fact that was not lost on Japanese troop commanders who also occupied this house during World War II.

== Recapture ==
The site, now mostly rubble, was recaptured by the 37th Infantry Division late on 31 January 1945.

== Notable personnel ==
- Paul D. Phillips, battery officer (1941), retired as a brigadier general.

== In literature ==
John Grisham's novel The Reckoning includes a description of the Second World War raid by American and Japanese guerrillas on the Japanese-held Fort Stotsenburg and the destruction of numerous Japanese Zero aircraft.

== See also ==
- Clark Air Base
- Geography of the Philippines
- Military History of the Philippines
- Military History of the United States
