= 71st Infantry Regiment (PA) =

- Active: August 1941 – April 1942
- Disbanded: April 9, 1942
- Countries: United States of America; Commonwealth of the Philippines
- Allegiance: United States Army; Philippine Commonwealth Army
- Branch: Army
- Type: Infantry
- Role: Reserve Unit
- Size: 1,500
- Part of: 71st Infantry Division
- Garrison/HQ: Camp O'Donnell, Tarlac; Mambucal, Negros Occidental
- Engagements: Battle of Rosario, Pangasinan Battle of Layac Junction Battle of Points, Bataan

Commanders
- Notable commanders: Colonel Donald N. Van Bonnett, USA

71st Infantry Regiment is a reserve unit of Philippine Commonwealth Army under 71st Infantry Division activated and organized in Negros Island. It was transferred to Luzon island to bolster its defending forces during World War II. It fought in Northern Luzon and in Bataan where it defeated Japanese at the Battle of the Points.

== Background ==
The regiment was activated and organized on August 28, 1941, it was inducted on September 1 at Fabrica, Negros Occidental by Lieutenant Colonel Donald Van Bonnett, USA who was assigned also as the regimental commander. He formed his regimental staffs and appointed commanders for each Battalions. Major Duran is the regimental executive officer, Major Jacinto Aguila as Adjutant and S1, 1Lieutenant Bienvenido Padilla, S2, 1Lieutenant Epifanio Liberal as S3; Captain Simeon D. Yra as S4. Captain Guillermo Nakar was appointed as commander of 1st Battalion, Captain Jose V. H. Banzon, CO, 2nd Battalion; and Captain Fernando Nicolas, CO 3rd Battalion. The regimental went into hard training under American instructors.

=== Transfer to Luzon ===
In September 1941, 7th Military District received an order to shift 71st Infantry Regiment to Luzon. On September 13, 1941, Regimental Staffs and HQ & HQ Company left Negros and arrived in Manila then transported to Camp O'Donnell, Tarlac Three of its Battalions followed reaching Manila and immediately railed to Camp O'Donnell so training can resume.

After all units of 71st Division arrived in Luzon, division staff was organized by Colonel Van Bonnett and Colonel Clyde Selleck arrived to assumed command.

== Japanese Invasion ==
On December 8, 1941, Japanese bombed Clark, Iba, and Loakan Air Fields also Fort Stotsenberg. 71st Infantry was held as reserve force of North Luzon Force under Major General Jonathan M. Wainwright IV. The Japanese unexpectedly landed at the east coast of Lingayen Gulf which caught North Luzon Force off guard as they were expecting Japanese will land at the west coast which 21st Infantry Division prepared beach defenses. General Wainwright send 26th US Cavalry and 71st Infantry to stop Japanese advanced towards Baguio City. 1st Battalion under Captain Guillermo Nakar withdraw towards Baguio City and 2nd Battalion under Captain Jose Banzon withdrawn southward in order not to get outflanked by the Japanese. Entire regiment was posted at Rosario-Baguio Road. However, due to unstoppable armored force of the Japanese it breakthrough that force 71st to moved up to Baguio. 1st Battalion will cover the withdraw of 2nd and 3rd Battalions and moved south to rejoin the rest of the division in Pampanga. Colonel Van Bonnett led his regiment into hiking towards jungles of Cordilleras and reached Balete Pass and rejoined 71st Division in Mexico, Pampanga.

1st Battalion under Captain Nakar was still in Bauang- Naguillian Road covering the withdrawal of other battalions of 71st Infantry when he pulled out he found no 71st Infantry as it already withdrawn towards Balete Pass. He withdrawn towards to San Jose when he found out it is already in Japanese hands, he decided to stay at the mountains to conduct resistance for as long as possible. Along with C Troops, 26th Cavalry under Captain Everett Warner, elements of 11th and 91st Infantry Division under Captain Manuel Enriquez G2 of 11th Infantry Division form a 1st Guerilla Regiment and attacked Japanese units in the area.

=== Battle of Layac Junction ===
71st Infantry again was engaged in Layac Junction after General Selleck commander of 71st Division was appointed to setup defense at the main entrance to Bataan. Together with battered and exhausted 72nd Infantry and elements of 91st Division, 26th Cavalry and 31st US Infantry with 71st Field Artillery in support, they put up a holding position in Layac Junction. 71st Infantry along with other units was badly mauled by the long range artilleries of the Japanese. However, 21st Division and 51st Division was able to get into Bataan due to this action.

==== I Corps ====
Battered and exhausted the 71st regiment and other 71st Division units was posted in I Corps at the west coast of Bataan as reserves for rest and refit. It was thrown again to battle during Japanese assault of Mauban-Abucay line on January 10, 1942. 71st Infantry was posted in Aglaloma which is a quiet sector and for the first time the regiment was able to rest for 2 weeks since fighting in Central Luzon.

==== Battle of Points ====
71st was again thrown to battle on January 22 when Japanese attempted to land and create a beachhead at Mariveles. This was known as Battle of the Points, it took Bataan Defense Force more than 3 weeks to thwart the landings. With reinforcements from 1st and 2nd PC Regiments and other miscellaneous units to prevent the expansion of the beachhead.

71st Infantry and 71st Division was withdrawn to Service Area Command and held as reserve force. The regiment was plugged to I Corps area during the Japanese Final Assault to Orion-Bagac Line in March.

Bataan Defense Force was surrendered by General Edward P. King Jr. Commander of Luzon Force on April 9, 1942. The regiment surrendered and was assembled in Mariveles, Bataan where they were forced to walked 65 miles to San Fernando, Pampanga came to be known as Bataan Death March.
