= 71st Division (Philippines) =

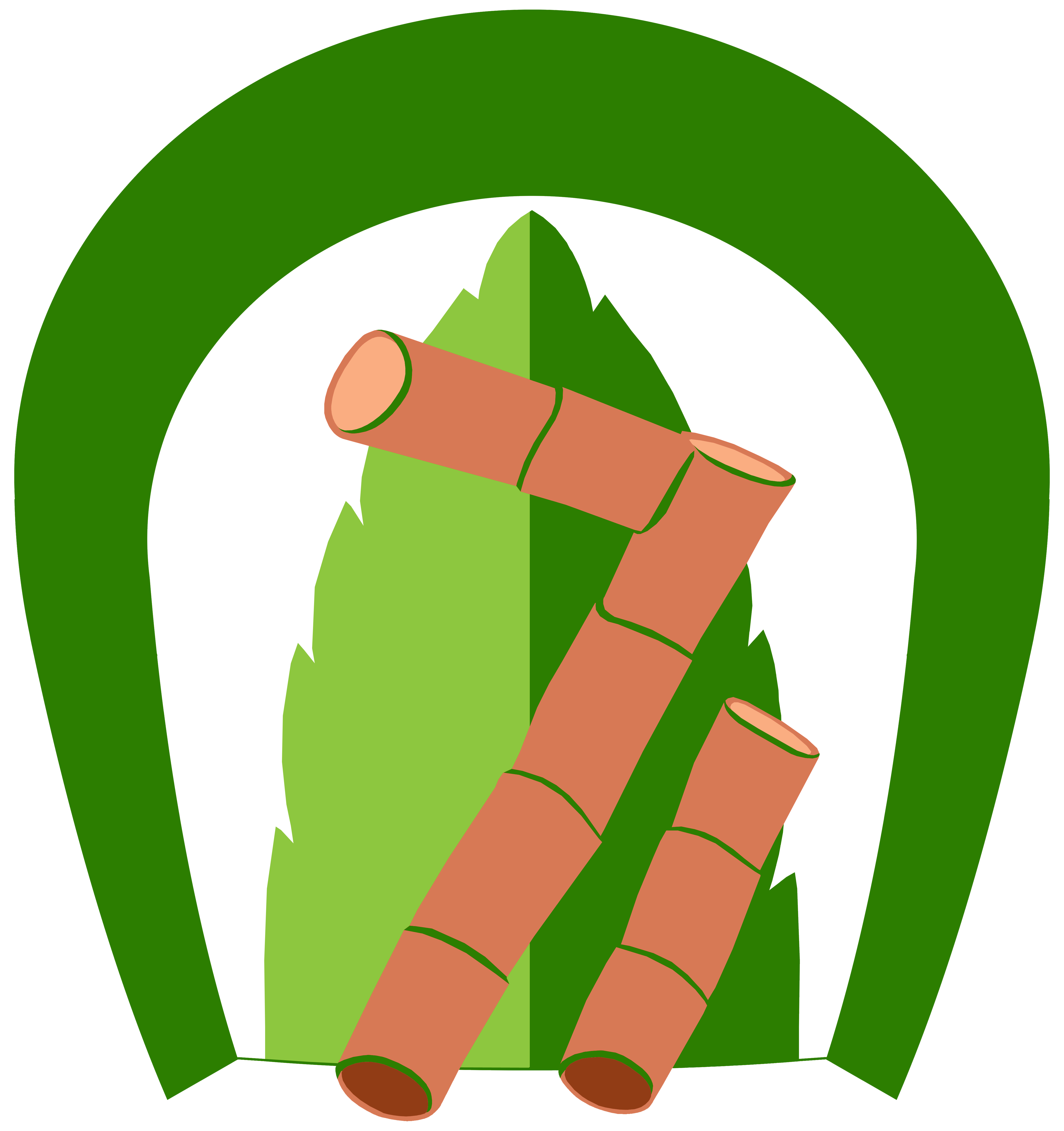
- 71st Philippine Division Emblem 1941-42
- Active: 1941 - 9 April 1942
- Country: Commonwealth of the Philippines
- Allegiance: United States of America; Philippines
- Branch: Philippine Army
- Type: Infantry Division
- Size: Division
- Part of: South Luzon Force
- Garrison/HQ: Camp O'Donnell, Capas, Tarlac
- Equipment: M1917 Enfield Rifles, M1917 Browning Machineguns, M1918 Browning Automatic Rifles, M1923 Thompson Submachineguns, 3inch Stokes Mortar, M1935 37mm Carriage Guns, M1918 75mm Guns, M1A1 75mm Pack Howitzers
- Engagements: World War II: Battle of Bataan; Philippines campaign (1941–1942)

Commanders
- Division Staffs: Chief of Staff - LCol. Salvador Reyes Assistant Chief of Staff - Capt Juan Relosa ADC - 3Lt. Francisco Gallego | 2Lt. Juan F. Fernandez
- Support Staffs: ACS Personnel G1 & Adjutant - Maj Juan Relosa ACS Intelligence G2 - Maj. Felix Maniego; ACS Operations G3 - LCol. Pedro San Diego; ACS Supply G4 - Maj Severino Obana; Quartermaster - LCol. Daniel Victoria; Surgeon - LCol. Manuel De Luna; Judge Advocate - Capt. Leonardo Lucena; Chaplain - Capt. Jose Miranda; Supply - Capt Artemio Malabayabas; Engineer - Capt. Hector R. Franco; Provost Marshal - Capt. Santiago Ledesma; Veterinarian - 1Lt. Cipriano Flores Communications - Capt. Luis Alba
- Military Adviser: Maj. William D. Collins, USA
- Notable commanders: Col. (later BGen.) Clyde A. Selleck; BGen. Clinton A. Pierce

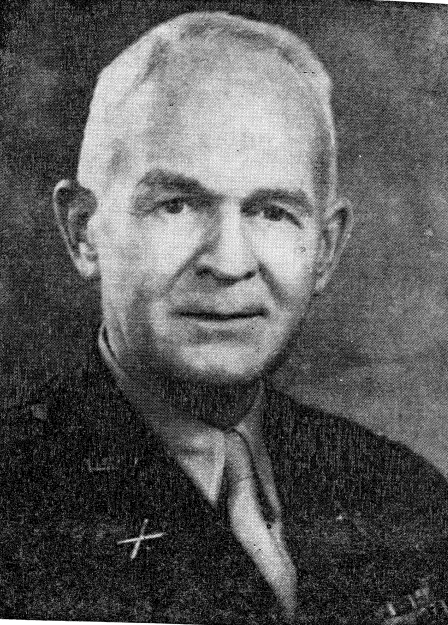
General Clyde Selleck commanded the division from December 1941 in Pangasinan and in the battle of Layac Junction in early January 1942.

The 71st Infantry Division was a reserve division of the Philippine Army that fought under the United States Army Forces in the Far East (USAFFE). It was known for its fight with Japanese invading forces in Layac Junction, that was ordered to hold until all retreating Fil-American forces crossed into the Bataan Peninsula.

== Organization ==
The division was activated in Negros and transferred to Luzon to augment the North Luzon Force. It was active from 1941 to April 9, 1942, whereupon it surrendered when Bataan fell. Previously it was active in Southern Luzon. Initially Lieutenant Colonel Donald Van Bonnett was appointed to start organizing its troops. Then few days later Col. (later BGen.) Clyde A. Selleck (USA), a 1910 U.S. Military Academy graduate, arrived in Negros to assumed command as the division commander. The division was inducted to USAFFE on September 1, 1941. General Selleck commanded the division until February 1942, when BGen. Clinton A. Pierce (USA) took over the command. Pierce had previously been in command of the U.S. 26th Cavalry Regt. (PS) since before the Japanese opened hostilities. Col. Salvador F. Reyes (PA), a 1917 U.S. Military Academy graduate, was the division's chief of staff. Initially activated on Negros island were 71st and 72nd Infantry regiments are formed. The division was transferred to Luzon on September 1, 1941. leaving its third regiment the 73rd Infantry as it was still being mobilized.

== Order of Battle August to September 1941 ==
- 71st Infantry Regiment (PA) (LCol. D. Van N. Bonnett) (moved to Luzon)
  - 1st Bn - Capt Guillermo Nakar, PA
  - 2nd Bn - Capt. Jose V. H. Banzon, PA
  - 3rd Bn - Capt. Fernando Nicolas, PA
- 72nd Infantry Regiment (PA) (Col. Lloyd Biggs, Inf.)(moved from Negros to Luzon on 9 Dec 41)
  - 1st Bn - Maj. Caswell
  - 2nd Bn - Capt Sofronio Jimenia
  - 3rd Bn - Capt Johnson
- 73rd Infantry Regiment (PA)(Capt. Juan Taduran, Maj. Robert H. Vessey) (remained on Negros island)
  - 1st Bn - 1Lt. Albert F. Chase
  - 2nd Bn - 1lt. Jack Lare
  - 3rd Bn - 2Lt. John W. Stephens
- 71st Field Artillery Regiment (PA) (LCol. Halstead C. Fowler)
  - HQ & HQ Company - 3Lt. Gregorio Katimbang
  - 1st Bn(75mm guns, 8x) - 1Lt. Eriberto Ignacio
  - 2nd Bn (2.95-inch pack howitzers, 12x) - 2Lt. David Lopez
  - 3rd Bn - 2Lt. David Lopez
- 71st Engineer Battalion (PA) - Capt. Hector Franco, PA (but under direct supervision of Col. Skerry the NLF Chief Engineer)
- 71st Division Units
  - 71st Division Headquarters & HQ Company
  - 71st Medical Battalion
  - 71st Signal Company
  - 71st Quartermaster Company (Motorized)
  - 71st QM Transport Company (Truck)

=== World War II ===
The division was designated as a reserve force USAFFE initially attached to South Luzon Force. However, on November 25, 1941 it was transferred to North Luzon Force only to be committed if permitted by USAFFE headquarters. It saw little action at the start of the hostilities.

==== Rosario-Baguio Road Junction ====
General Wainwright attached 26th Cavalry Regiment to 71st Infantry Division and ordered BGen. Selleck to move his division from Urdaneta, Pangasinan to Damortis and prevent Japanese from moving south. 72nd Infantry Regiment of Col. Lloyd Biggs and 71st Infantry Regiment under LCol. Halstead Fowler accompanied by General Selleck arrived at Rosario. 26th Cavalry was to cover the right flank of 71st Division and hold the junction of Rosario-Baguio road, east of Rosario in order to permit the 71st Infantry Regiment (less 1st Bn) under LCol. Donal Van Bonnett then at Baguio to clear that point and join North Luzon Force.

==== Battle of Layac Junction ====
On January 6, 1942, the 71st Infantry Division under Brigadier General Selleck was posted at Layac Junction in Dinalupihan, Bataan supported by the 31st US Infantry Regiment under Colonel Charles Steele, 26th US Cavalry (Motorized) Regiment of Colonel Clinton Pierce with supporting units of artilleries, Light tanks, and self-propelled guns fought Imai detachment of 48th IJA Division. The junction was a key position based on WPO 3 and designated as a first line of resistance (MLR) of the combined Fil-American forces.

In this battle, Sergeant Jose Calugas (MOH) eluded bullets to take over a fallen comrade's machine gun and led a group of volunteers, and engaged the Japanese in a shootout thus enabling other soldiers to take advantageous positions to defend the line. For this extraordinary bravery, he was awarded the Medal of Honor. Lts. Julian Chua and Cecilio Garcia were also awarded Distinguished Service Cross for exhibiting exceptional courage.

==== Battle of Bataan ====
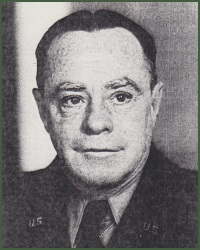
Brigadier General Clinton Pierce commanded the division in Battle of Points in March until its surrender in April.

The division saw action in defending Quinauan Point from the Japanese landings in the western coast of the Bataan peninsula. The division was never utilized as one unit as it was downsized due to casualties and desertions of Filipino soldiers.

==== Surrender ====
On April 9, 1942, General Edward P. King surrendered the entire Bataan Force and the entire 71st Infantry Division fell to captivity and suffered more casualties during the dreaded Death March from Mariveles, Bataan to San Fernando, Pampanga.

=== Other units ===
73rd Infantry Regiment was left in Negros island as it was still activated by the time division was ordered to Luzon. Eventually the regiment was attached to 81st Infantry Division under BGen. Guy O. Fort and saw action at Malabang, Lanao engaging Kawaguchi detachment.

To cover the defense of Negros island LCol. Gabriel Gador commander of 7th Military District requested to call to arms all reserve soldiers and activated 74th Provisional Infantry Regiment under the command of Major Sam Jones to defend Negros Occidental and later 75th Provisional Infantry Regiment under LCol. Teburcio Ballesteros to defend Negros Oriental. Colonel Roger Hilsman arrived to take matters on Negros defense and became a component of Visayan Force of BGen. Bradford Chynoweth. When General Wainwright surrendered Corregidor in May 1942 all units in Visayas and Mindanao also surrendered as part of the condition by General Homma.

== Order of Battle December to April 1942 ==
71st Division
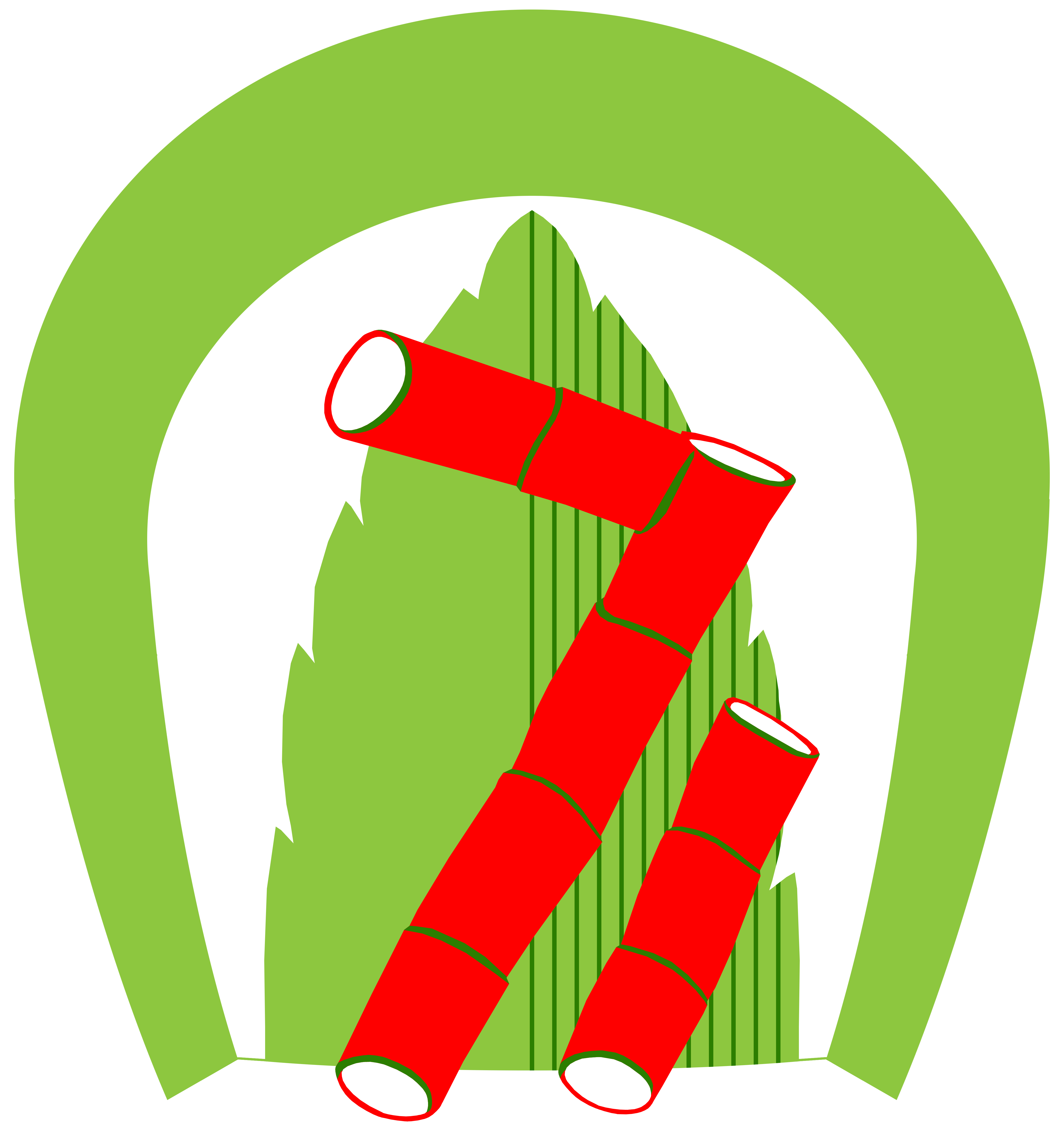
- 71st Philippine Division Emblem 1941-42, alternate version
- Branch: Philippine Army

=== Forces in Bataan ===
- 71st Infantry Regiment (PA) - LCol. Donald Van N. Bonnett
  - 1st Bn
  - 2nd Bn
  - 3rd Bn
- 72nd Infantry Regiment (PA) Col. Irving Campton then (Col. Virgilio N. Cordero, Inf.)
  - 1st Bn
  - 2nd Bn
  - 3rd Bn
- 71st Field Artillery Regiment (PA) (LCol. Halstead C. Fowler)
  - 71st FA Regt HQ Company
  - 1st Bn/71st FA Regt (PA) (75mm guns, 8x)
  - 2nd Bn/71st FA Regt (PA) (2.95-inch pack howitzers, 12x)
  - 3rd Bn/71st FA Regt (PA)
- 71st Reconnaissance Battalion
- 71st Engineer Battalion (PA)
- 71st Division Units
  - 71st Division Headquarters & HQ Company
  - 71st Medical Battalion
  - 71st Signal Company
  - 71st Quartermaster Company (Motorized)
  - 71st QM Transport Company (Truck)

=== Forces in Negros ===
Negros Force - Colonel Roger Hilsman | Colonel Carter McClennan (Acting) | Colonel Roger Hilsman

- 74th Provisional Infantry Regiment (PA) (Major Sam Jones) under Negros Force
  - 1st Bn - Major Angel Okol | Maj Francisco Gomez
  - 2nd Bn - Major Francisco Gomez | Major Salvador Abcede
  - 3rd Bn - Capt Ernesto Mata
- 75th Provisional Infantry Regiment (LCol. Teburcio Ballesteros) under Negros Force
  - 1st Bn - 1Lt Feliciano Señeres | Major Pulong Arpa
  - 2nd Bn - 1Lt Antonio Romero | Capt Benjamin Ignacio | Major Fortunato Roque
- 72nd Field Artillery Regiment
- PC Battalion Negros

=== Unit in Mindanao ===
73rd Infantry Regiment (PA)(LCol. Robert H. Vesey) (attached to 81st ID in Lanao sector Mindanao)

- 1st Battalion - Maj Albert F. Chase
- 2nd Battalion - Capt Jack Lare
- 3rd Battalion - Capt John W. Stephens

== Notables Soldiers ==
- Salvador Abcede - later commanded 20th BCT in Korean War.
- Ernesto Mata - later became commanding general Philippine Army and AFP Chief of Staff.
- Uldarico Baclagon - Retired as Army Colonel and became Historian and author.
- Diosdado L. Rodriguez - Gold Cross Medal Awardee
- Clyde Selleck - First commander
- Clinton Pierce - Second Commander

== Sources ==
- Morton, Louis (1953). United States Army in World War II, The War in the Pacific: The Fall of the Philippines. Washington, D.C.: Center of Military History, United States Army.
- Whitman, John W. (1990). Bataan: Our Last Ditch: The Bataan Campaign, 1942. Hippocrene Books. ISBN 0-87052-877-7.

== Bibliography ==
- Morton, Louis. The Fall of the Philippines (Publication 5-2) . Retrieved on 14 Feb 2017.
