= Clinton A. Pierce =

United States Army general

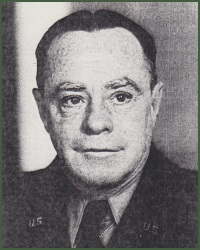
- Born: June 15, 1894; Brooklyn, New York, US
- Died: August 22, 1966 (aged 72); Eureka Springs, Arkansas
- Burial place: Arlington National Cemetery
- Military career
- Allegiance: United States of America
- Branch: United States Army
- Service years: 1916–1951
- Rank: Brigadier General
- Commands: 71st Division (Philippines); 26th Cavalry Regiment
- Conflicts: World War I World War II ● Battle of Bataan
- Awards: Distinguished Service Medal; Silver Star (2); Purple Heart

Clinton Albert Pierce (June 15, 1894 – August 22, 1966) was an American brigadier general and commander of the 26th Cavalry Regiment (Philippine Scouts) during the Battle of Bataan.

== Military service ==
Pierce served as a corporal in the Illinois National Guard field artillery from June to October 1916. He was commissioned as a U.S. Army second lieutenant of cavalry in March 1917. Pierce served as a temporary major during World War I.

Pierce graduated from the Cavalry School advanced course in 1932. He was promoted to major in March 1930 and lieutenant colonel in July 1939.

Sent to the Philippines in May 1940, Pierce received temporary promotions to colonel in October 1941 and brigadier general in January 1942. He then assumed command of the 71st Division. After surrendering to Japanese forces in April 1942, Pierce spent over three years as a prisoner of war.

=== Post War ===
In March 1947, his temporary promotion to brigadier general was renewed. In April 1947, his promotion to colonel was made permanent retroactive to December 1945. His postwar assignments were at Fort Riley, Kansas and Augsburg, West Germany. He retired from active duty as a brigadier general on February 28, 1951.

== Later life ==
After his retirement, Pierce and his wife Margaret settled in Eureka Springs, Arkansas. He died at Eureka Springs City Hospital of lingering complications from an automobile accident and was interred at Arlington National Cemetery on August 25, 1966.
