= 23rd Field Artillery Regiment (United States) =

Inactive US army unit

23rd Field Artillery Battalion
- Active: 1921
- Country: United States
- Branch: Army
- Type: Field artillery

The 23rd Field Artillery Battalion was a field artillery battalion of the regular Army that was constituted as a US-manned unit in 1921, but redesignated as a Philippine Scouts unit in 1930.

== Lineage ==
The battalion was formed on 16 August 1921 in the United States Regular Army under the name of the 1st Battalion, 23d Field Artillery. It was redesignated on 1 January 1930 as the 1st Battalion 23d Field Artillery (Philippine Scouts). On 6 May 1942, the battalion surrendered to the Japanese forces in the Philippines Islands. The battalion was later disbanded on 25 March 1952.

== Decorations ==
- Presidential Unit Citation, Streamer embroidered BATAAN
- Presidential Unit Citation, Streamer embroidered LUZON 1941–1942
- Presidential Unit Citation, Streamer embroidered DEFENSE OF THE PHILIPPINES
- Presidential Unit Citation, Streamer embroidered 7 DECEMBER 1941 TO 10 MAY 1942

== Coat of arms ==
The 7th Field Artillery Observation Battalion's coat of arms was reassigned to the 23rd in 1955.

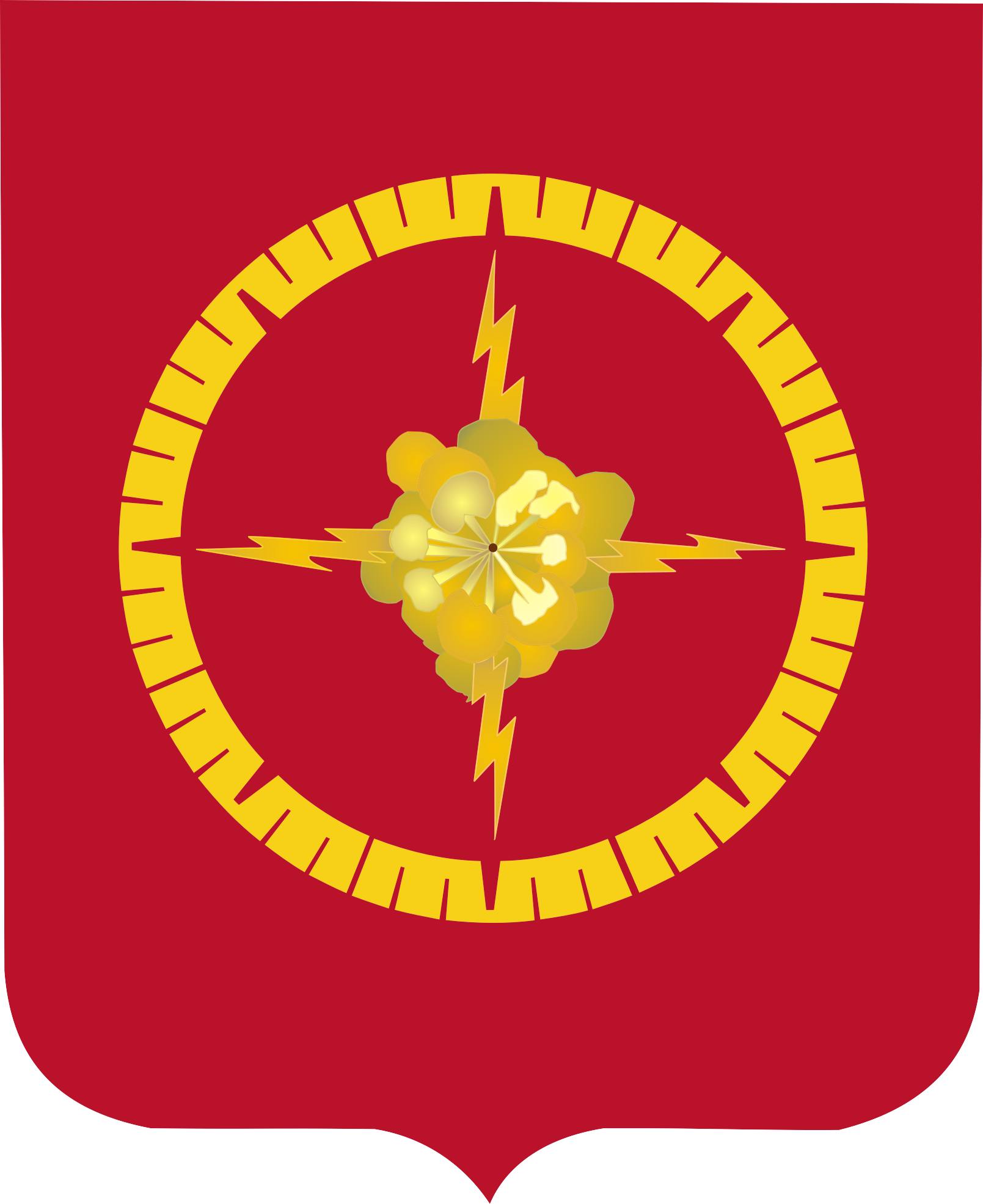

== See also ==
- Field Artillery Branch (United States)
- U.S. Army Regimental System
