= 26th Cavalry Regiment (Philippine Scouts) =

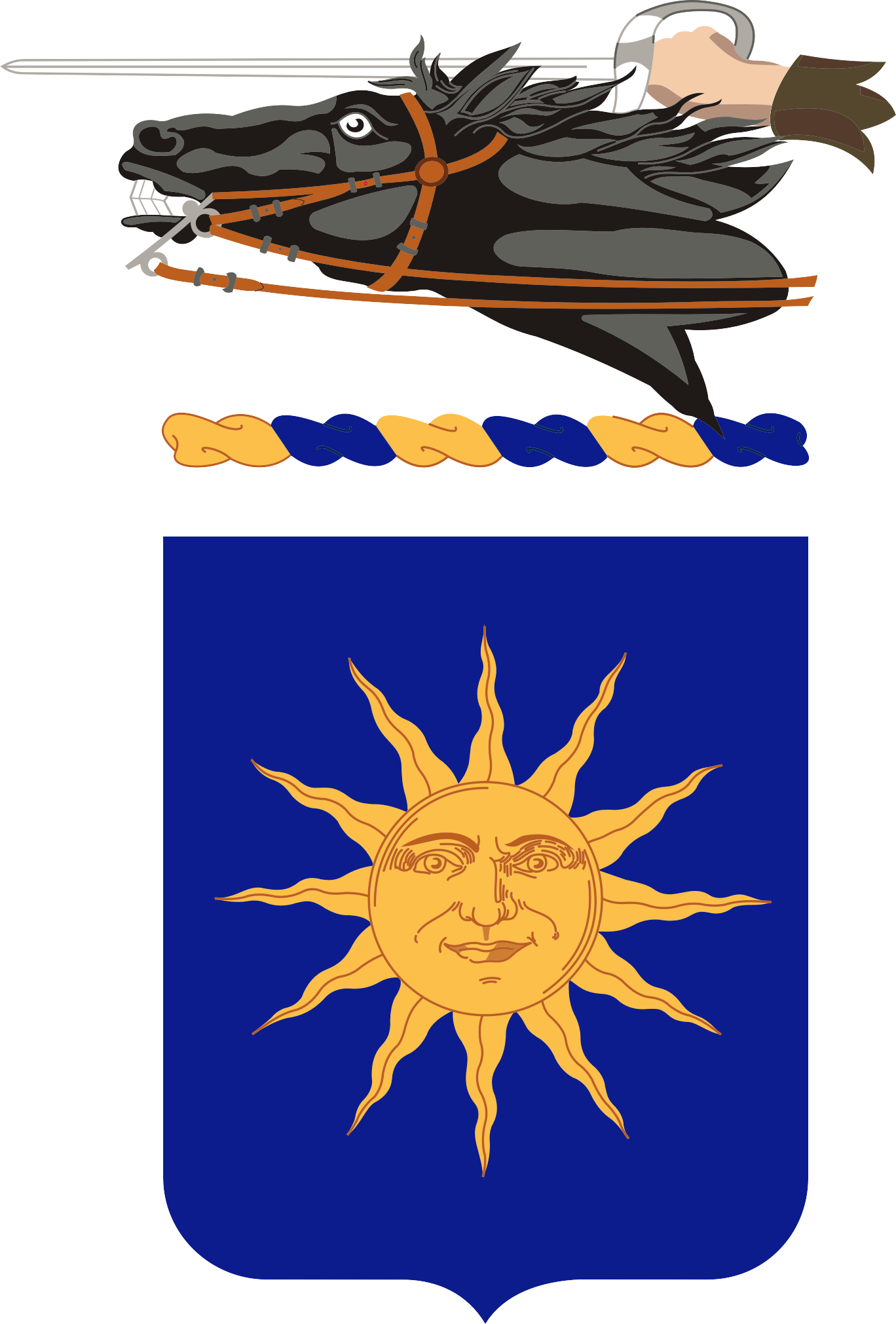
- Coat of arms
- Active: 1922–1946
- Disbanded: 1951
- Country: United States
- Allegiance: United States of America; Commonwealth of the Philippines
- Branch: United States Army
- Type: Cavalry
- Size: Regiment
- Garrison/HQ: Fort Stotsenburg
- Motto: Our strength is in loyalty
- Engagements: World War II: Philippine Islands
- Decorations: Presidential Unit Citation; Philippine Presidential Unit Citation

Commanders
- Notable commanders: BG Clinton A. Pierce

Insignia
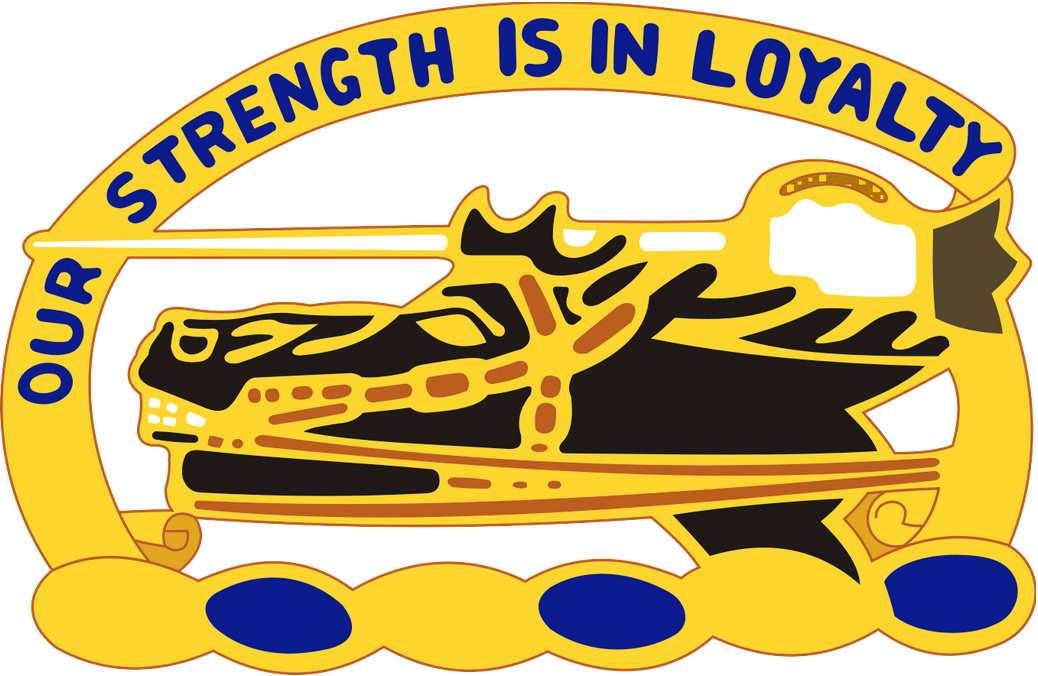
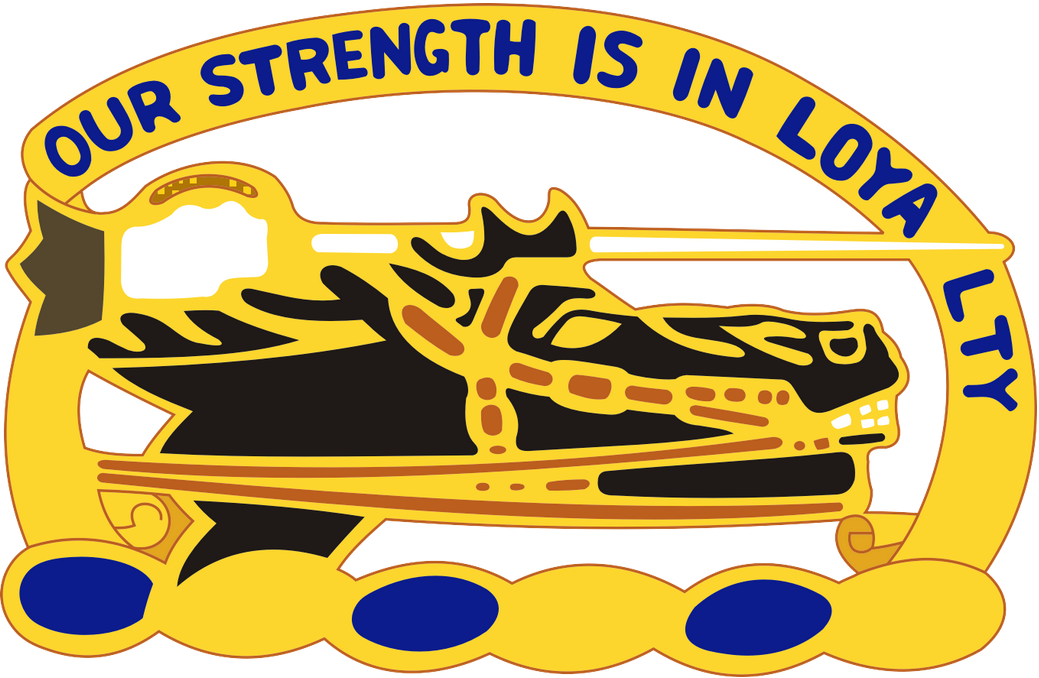
- Left & right distinctive unit insignia

The 26th Cavalry Regiment (Philippine Scouts) (26th CAV (PS)) was part of U.S. Army Forces Far East's Philippine Department, during World War II. The 26th engaged in the last cavalry charge in the history of the U.S. cavalry. The American Battle Monuments Commission list 301 dead who were members of this regiment interred at Manila American Cemetery and Memorial.

== Formation ==
The 26th Cavalry Regiment was constituted in the Regular Army on 1 October 1922 and assigned to the Philippine Department. It was concurrently activated at Fort Stotsenburg by transfer of personnel from the 25th Field Artillery Regiment (PS) and 43rd Infantry Regiment (PS), with equipment and horses taken from the 9th Cavalry Regiment when that regiment transferred to Fort Riley, Kansas, on 12 October 1922. The entire regiment was based at Fort Stotsenburg, with the exception of Troop F, which was based at Nichols Field. In addition to the horse-mounted troops, the regiment had a Headquarters Troop, Machine Gun Troop, and a platoon of six Indiana White M1 scout cars, and trucks for transporting its service elements. The regiment was reorganized on 1 December 1927 as a three-squadron regiment. Troops C and G were inactivated on 6 March 1928 at Fort Stotsenburg. Concurrently, the 2nd Machine Gun Troop was redesignated the Machine Gun Troop, 26th Cavalry. The regiment conducted a river crossing exercise in May 1933 on the Rio Grande de Mindanao and Hagonoy Rivers. Troops C and G were activated on 15 March 1941 at Fort Stotsenburg. The 26th Cavalry was the primary reconnaissance force for the Philippine Department, and was assigned the task of performing the covering force mission from Lingayen Gulf to the Bataan Peninsula. On 30 November 1941, the regiment had 787 enlisted men and 55 officers, and its commander was Colonel (later Brigadier General) Clinton A. Pierce (USA).

== World War II combat history ==
=== Northern and central Luzon ===
Following the 1941 Japanese invasion, the 26th participated in the Allied withdrawal to the Bataan Peninsula. In doing so, the unit conducted a classic delaying action that allowed other, less mobile, units to safely withdraw to the peninsula. During the delaying action the 26th provided the "stoutest" and only "serious opposition" to the Japanese; the majority of the units sent north towards Lingayen Gulf were divisions (11th, 21st, 71st, & 91st Infantry Divisions) of the untrained and poorly equipped Philippine Army. For instance, during the initial landings the regiment alone delayed the advance of four Japanese infantry regiments for six hours at Damortis.

==== Delaying Action ====
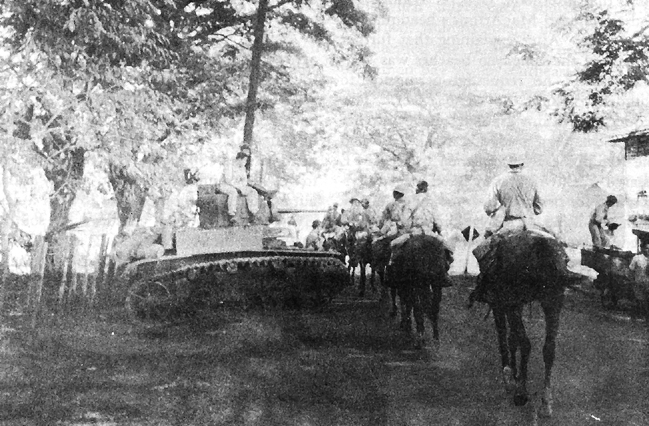
Cavalrymen moving into Pozorrubio on 23 December 1941.

On the morning of 24 December, the unit was stationed north of the town of Binalonan. Colonel Pierce and his mounted troops held the ground surrounding the highway to the town, whilst the accompanying 91st Infantry Regiment held the town and the southern flank. Beginning at 05:00, the Japanese 4th Armored Regiment began an assault on the 26th's position using Ha-Go and Chi-Ha tanks along with dismounted infantry. The defenders repelled the assault, and reportedly rode up to the tanks on horseback or on foot and used frag grenades to disable the engines. Once these ran out, improvised Molotov cocktails made from Coke bottles and dried banana leaves were used. Other defenders in hastily constructed trenches and repelled the dismounted infantry with rifle and machine gun fire. As the fighting continued throughout the morning, the defenders' supplies began to dwindle. Ammunition was running low on their rifles and machine guns, and the Japanese had deployed the 1st and 2nd Formosan Infantry Regiments to try and push the 26th Regiment out of their position. Mounted couriers were sent back into town to retrieve ammunition and supplies, but due to the distance between the front and the town, the regiment risked their positions being overrun before the couriers could make it back with their supplies. Certain troops of the 26th Cavalry decided to buy time and gamble; when the two regiments of Formosan infantry assaulted, these troops charged on horseback into enemy lines with M1911 pistols and swords. The Formosan infantry, having been composed of poorly trained conscripts with inferior equipment, retreated hastily back to Japanese lines. The gamble paid off, and the mounted couriers arrived with fresh supplies, including .30-06 ammunition, Molotov cocktails, and frag grenades. Eventually, at around 13:00, the Japanese 47th Regiment was sent into battle; together, with the other Japanese units, they fought the defenders and managed to force them back at 15:30 after two and a half hours of fierce fighting. The delaying action of the 26th Cavalry and the accompanying 91st Infantry halted the Japanese advance on the eastern portion of Luzon, allowing for the consolidation of the D-1 line and causing the Japanese Army to, for the next few days, exercise caution in their maneuvers. However, the resistance was not without cost, as by the end of 24 December the regiment had been reduced to 450 men. Following these events, the regiment was pulled off the line and brought back up to a strength of 657 men, who in January 1942 held open the roadways to the Bataan Peninsula allowing other units to prepare for their stand there.

=== Bataan ===
The 26th Cavalry Regiment, consisting mostly of Philippine Scouts, was the last U.S. cavalry regiment to engage in horse-mounted warfare. When Troop G encountered Japanese forces at the village of Morong on 16 January 1942, Lieutenant Edwin P. Ramsey ordered, for that time, the last cavalry charge in American history.

During the retreat to Bataan, the 26th was heavily outnumbered by an infantry force supported by tanks. They drove off the surprised Japanese. Due to a shortage of food, they found it necessary to butcher their mounts and the regiment was converted to two squadrons, one a motorized rifle squadron, the other a mechanized squadron utilizing the remaining scout cars and Bren carriers.

=== Order of Battle 1942 ===
- Headquarters, 26th Cavalry Regiment (PS) - Captain Paul Montgomery Jones
  - 1st Scout Car Platoon - 1st Lieutenant Carol I. Cahoo, USA
  - Recon Patrol - Captain Charles Bowers
- 1st Squadron - Major Hubert Ketchum | Captain William E. Chandler
  - Troop A - 1st Lieutenant Hugh Stevenson
  - Troop B - Captain Theodore Hurt Jr. | Captain Joseph Rhett Barker
  - Troop C - Captain Ralph Praeger
  - Troop D
- 2nd Squadron - Major Thomas Trapnell, USA
  - Troop E
  - Troop F - 1st Lieutenant William Gordon Bartlett
  - Troop G - 1st Lieutenant Edwin Ramsay
  - Troop H

=== Guerrilla activities ===
Following the delaying action down the central Luzon plain, Troop C was cut off from the rest of the regiment, having been ordered into Northern Luzon in an attempt to defend Baguio by Major General Wainwright in late December 1941. In January 1942, the unit, with assistance from 71st Infantry and elements of the 11th Infantry, raided Tuguegarao Airfield, destroying several planes, and killing multiple Japanese soldiers. Eventually the unit was supplemented by other soldiers and guerrillas, and remained an effective fighting force well into 1943.The remnants of Troop C would later be integrated into the United States Army Forces in the Philippines – Northern Luzon, which due to deaths and captures would be led by Russell W. Volckmann. Other guerrilla organizations were led by officers of the regiment, who ignored the surrender orders, or by enlisted men who escaped from Bataan. However, those organizations did not have a direct connection to the regiment, as the Cagayan-Apayao Forces did.

== After World War Two ==
With the re-activation of the Philippine Division, the regiment was redesignated as the 12th Cavalry Reconnaissance Troop (Mechanized). It was assigned to Camp O'Donnell in Tarlac, equipped with M3A1 scout cars. During its time it had engaged with Hukbalahap forces.

The regiment was inactivated in 1946 and disbanded in 1951.

== Decorations ==
Ribbon	Award
	Presidential Unit Citation, 3 awards
	Philippine Presidential Unit Citation

Conflict	Streamer	Year(s)
World War II	Philippine Islands	7 Dec 41 - 10 May 42
World War II	World War II Victory	service between 7 December 1941 and 31 December 1946

== See also ==
- Horses in World War II
- Military history of the Philippines during World War II
