= Battle of Digos =

World War II battle in the Philippines

- Part of Battle of Mindanao
Date	December 31, 1941 – May 10, 1942
Location	Digos, Davao
Result	Japanese victory
Territorial changes	Southern Davao Province captured by Japanese forces

Belligerents
United States; Commonwealth of the Philippines	Empire of Japan

Commanders and leaders
(United States) Reed Graves (United States) John H. McGee (United States) Howard Perry (United States) Howard Frissell (Commonwealth of the Philippines) Manuel Acosta	(Empire of Japan) Tanaka Raizo (Empire of Japan) Muira Tushio

Units involved
"Ground Forces": Philippine Commonwealth Army: 3/101st Infantry; 3/102nd Infantry; 1/103rd Infantry; 1/101st Field Artillery; 3/101st Field Artillery; 101st Division Special Troops; Artillery Detachment; Philippine Constabulary: 3rd PC Regiment	Ground units: Japanese Fourteenth Army: 1/33rd Infantry; Naval units: Japanese Imperial Navy: 2nd Fleet; 11th Air Fleet; Kure Special Naval Landing Force

Strength
4,000 Troops 2 QF2.95inch Mountain Guns	3,000 Troops; 12 Tanks; 1 Light Carrier; 4 Destroyers 6 Transports

After Davao Force was dispersed on December 24, 1941, they went missing and no contact, General Joseph Vachon sent Lieutenant Colonel Howard Frissell to Digos, Davao and setup defense of Digos Junction area to prevent Japanese drive towards Digos-Pikit road and reaching Kabacan the southern terminus of Sayre Highway.

The Digos Force of Cotabato-Davao Sector held the Japanese for four months despite lack artillery guns and ammunition. The landing of one of the group of Sakaguchi detachment in Cotabato City and made a landing head to Pikit and Midsayap through the Mindanao River on April 28, 1942, made 101st Division commander General Vachon to order Digos Force to retreat towards Kabacan in fear of being cut off as Japanese are now fighting at the vicinity of Kabacan.

== Background ==
When Davao City, Davao was Japanese secured on December 24, 1941, at a great cost due to heavy casualties inflicted by the Davao Force under Lieutenant Colonel Roger Hilsman, Sakaguchi detachment under Major General Sakaguchi Kayatake was forced to use his reserves intended for Jolo, Sulu Invasion. He landed his troops in Malalag, Davao southeast of Davao Gulf. General Joseph Vachon, Commanding General of 101st Infantry Division, Philippine Commonwealth Army ordered Lieutenant Colonel Howard Frissell to setup defense in Digos area and locate the missing forces of Colonel Hilsman.

Japanese moved west to Padada, Davao where the setup their supply depot where they can attack Digos. Another landing was made by the Japanese along the shoreline from Padada to Digos.

=== Defending force ===
He has 3rd Battalion 101st Infantry and 3rd Battalion 102nd Infantry. On December 31, 1941, a detachment of three QF 2.95inch Mountain Guns under Captain Manuel Acosta of Philippine Army was arrived to support the force, which gave a little morale booster to the defending force. 3rd Battalion 101st Infantry under Major Arlie Higgins was posted at the south of Digos and 3rd Battalion 102nd Infantry under Captain Johnson posted in the north toward Davao.

=== Japanese force ===
Muira detachment was secluded in Davao City maintaining garrison duty. It did not move towards Digos only in February when battalions from 10th Independent Garrison arrived to replaced them on garrison duty. 2nd Kure Special Landing Force was freed from Legaspi, Albay and landed in Malalag, Davao to free Sakaguchi detachment and moved to Jolo, Sulu. Muira Detachment meanwhile was reinforced by 2 battalions of 10th Independent Garrison in order for them to move to Northern Davao towards Agusan and Digos to link with Kawaguchi Detachment.

== Combat narratives ==
Marines from 2nd Kure SNLF landed in the shoreline from Digos to Padada on December 31, 1941. With artillery, tanks, and air support it easily secured a beachhead and made contact on 3rd Battalion 101st which took heaviest pressure. Captain Johnson and his 3rd Battalion 102nd Infantry was ordered to assist the right flank. Captain Johnson was wounded and Captain Acosta commander of Artillery detachment was killed. The Digos-Pikit Junction was lost on this action. A reserve 3rd PC Infantry battalion at center was held it for a while but fled as towards Pikit. Captain Floyd Forte a Visayas-Mindanao Force HQ staff rallied to held the line near the Haley Plantation.

On January 18, 1942, Colonel Howard Frissell was replaced by Lieutenant Colonel Howard Perry with Major John H. McGee as his executive officer in Digos Sector. 3rd PC Infantry Regiment was replaced by 1/101st Infantry and 1/101st Field Artillery. 101st Special Troops was also attached to the sector to make raids on Japanese positions. First raid in Padada was successful and several warehouses were burned and Japanese supplies were destroyed. However, raiding team commander Captain Nicolas Del Rosario was killed on his wounds.

In March Lieutenant Colonel Howard Perry was replaced by his XO Major John H. McGee as he was ordered to be in Mindanao Force HQ in Malaybalay and assumed as Force Personnel Officer G1. McGee was promoted to Lieutenant Colonel and 3rd Battalion 101st Infantry was replaced by 1st Battalion 101st Field Artillery (equipped as infantry) under Major Reed Graves. 3rd Battalion 101st Infantry was fighting in the sector for three months since January 1942. 2nd Battalion 101st Infantry was again retrofit and attached to this again under its commander Major John Richardson.

In April Lieutenant Colonel John H. McGee was replaced by Lieutenant Colonel Reed Graves, commander of 101st Field Artillery Regiment. 101st Infantry Regiment units are pulled out to Kabacan and Aroman area in Carmen Ferry Sector. Muira receiving reinforcements took and offensive campaign in coordination with Kawaguchi detachment who just landed in Cotabato City and Parang. Graves forces repulsed Muira assaults twice with mortals and machineguns. However, due to Kawaguchi was able to make a landing head in Midsayap through Mindanao River, General Vachon ordered Graves to retreat towards Kabacan in fear of being cut off. Thus, the operations in Digos sector ended as operations are now concentrated in Kabacan and Carmen sector.

=== Surrender of Mindanao force ===
101st Infantry Division was still fighting when order from Mindanao Force headquarters reached Division headquarters to surrender at daybreak on May 12, 1942. Digos was the longest campaign in Mindanao during World War II as it reached four months before it was evacuated by 101st Division troops.

== See also ==
- Japanese invasion of Davao
- 101st Infantry Division
- 101st Infantry Regiment
- 102nd Infantry Regiment
- 103rd Infantry Regiment
- 101st Field Artillery Regiment
- Visayas-Mindanao Force
