= 101st Field Artillery Regiment (PA) =

- Active: August 26, 1941 – May 10, 1942
- Disbanded: May 12, 1942
- Countries: United States of America; Philippine Commonwealth
- Allegiance: United States Army
- Branch: Army
- Type: Field Artillery
- Role: fought as Infantry
- Size: 1500
- Part of: 101st Infantry Division
- Garrison/HQ: Camp Casisang, Malaybalay

Commanders
- Notable commanders: LCol. Reed Graves; LCol. Alexander Quintard

101st Field Artillery Regiment is a reserve field artillery regiment activated in August 1941 as part of 101st Infantry Division based in Camp Casisang in Bukidnon Province. After the Visayas-Mindanao Force only received 8 QF 2.95inch Mountain Guns and divided it between two divisions in the island 101st and 81st in Lanao sector, the regiment retrained into fighting as infantry due to lack of guns to operate.

== Background ==
The regiment was organized in Camp Keithley in Lanao Province from reservist, students, and local moros. It was commanded initially by Captain Abellana during the activation but he was replaced by Lieutenant Colonel Alexander Quintard while being moved to Camp Casisang in Bukidnon province. In November 1941, Quintard was ordered to transfer to Luzon to command 301st Field Artillery Regiment leaving Major Reed Graves in command.

Due to lack of artillery guns Graves was ordered to train his regiment into fighting as infantry. It fought as infantry during the entire Japanese invasion of Mindanao.

=== Combat narratives ===
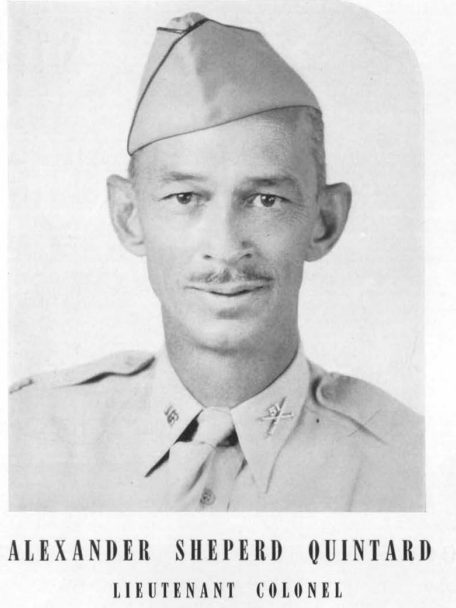
Lieutenant Colonel Alexander Quintard, American first commander of the regiment who was recalled to Luzon to command another artillery regiment.

In January 1942, a detachment with four QF 2.95inch Guns from 101st FA under Captain Manuel Acosta was dispatched to Digos Subsector to provide fire support 3/101st Infantry and 3/102nd Infantry under Lieutenant Colonel Howard Frissell who setup the new Main Line of Resistance (MLR) in Digos, Davao. They engaged Japanese forces who landed in Malalag and made Padada as its combat base. The Japanese with superior weapons, naval and air support made their progress easy. On January 12, 1942, the detachment received a direct hit from a naval gun destroying one gun and killing its commander Captain Acosta. With the order of the Visayas-Mindanao Force CG Sharp all guns were withdrawn to Bukidnon. In February 1942, 3rd Battalion 101st FA was dispatched and attached Digos SubSector to replace 3/102nd Infantry. The 3rd Battalion was fighting as infantry due to lack of artillery guns to operate. In April, 1 Battalion 101st Field Artillery under Lieutenant Colonel Reed Graves was dispatched to Digos to replace 1/101st Infantry who had been fighting in that sector since February 1942. In April Lieutenant Colonel Reed Graves took over the command of Digos Subsector.

2nd Battalion 101st FA was posted in Midsayap, Cotabato to prevent Japanese landing through Mindanao River. In March Lieutenant Colonel Reed Graves took over the command of Digos sector from Lieutenant Colonel John H. McGee who was suffering from malaria.

On April 26, Muira detachment received reinforcements and was ordered to keep engaged for Kawaguchi to reach Kabacan. Colonel Graves repulsed these attempts twice from his prepared positions with mortars and machine guns. However, he was ordered to pullback in Kabacan as Kawaguchi detachment reached Midsayap and Pikit.

== Surrender ==
On May 10, 1942 Visayas-Mindanao Force CG Major General William F. Sharp ordered all units in Visayas and Mindanao to surrender at daybreak the following day. 101st Division commander BG Joseph Vachon ordered 101st FA to surrender but LCol Graves allowed those Filipino soldiers who do not want to surrender to escape to the hills.

== See also ==
- Visayas-Mindanao Force
- Mindanao Force
- 101st Infantry Division
- 101st Infantry Regiment
- 102nd Infantry Regiment
- 103rd Infantry Regiment
