= 104th Infantry Regiment (PA) =

- Active: January 1942 – May 1942
- Disbanded: May 10, 1942
- Countries: United States; Philippines
- Allegiance: United States Army; Philippine Commonwealth Army
- Branch: Army
- Type: Light Infantry
- Role: Provisional Infantry
- Size: 1,000
- Part of: 101st Division (Philippines)
- Garrison/HQ: Kabacan, Cotabato
- Equipment: M1917 Enfield Rifle; Barong; Kris; Bow & Arrows
- Engagements: Battle of Kabacan

Commanders
- Notable commanders: Captain Henry Macner

Insignia
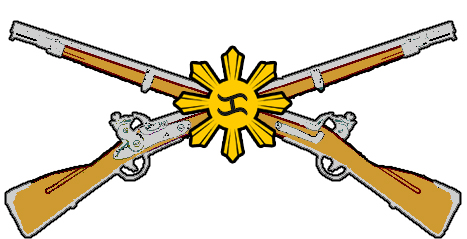
- Identification symbol

104th Infantry Regiment, was a unit of Philippine Commonwealth Army activated and organized while the war progressed. It was organized with moros and local recruits within Cotabato-Davao Sector under 101st Infantry Division under Brigadier General Joseph Vachon in Mindanao Island during World War II.

== Background ==
In January 1942, due to sudden influx of volunteers and Moros who wanted to fight the Japanese in Cotabato-Davao Sector General Vachon organized a regiment to control this volunteers and warriors who did not go through a formal training but has a great fighting skills, under American officers. These soldiers go home as they like as they are not regular soldiers. This also coincided that 103rd Infantry Regiment under Major Joseph Webb was ordered transferred to Cagayan Sector to form the newly activated 102nd Infantry Division.

Colonel Howard Perry then commander of Digos Subsector, allowed a Moro battalion under Captain Henry Macner to fought Japanese in a guerilla warfare resorting to ambuscades and raids to Japanese units. This gave the Japanese fear in entering jungles and limited their movement within the highway. Due to this success, succeeding commanders Colonel Reed Graves and John McGee expanded this unit to a regiment adding another battalion and deployed in Cotabato subsector under Lieutenant Colonel Russell J. Nelson. However, the 3rd battalion was not organized until surrender.

Due to this unit is not a regular force soldiers were sent home after the order of surrender was given by Mindanao Force.
