= Mindanao Force =

- Hukbong Lakas ng Mindanao
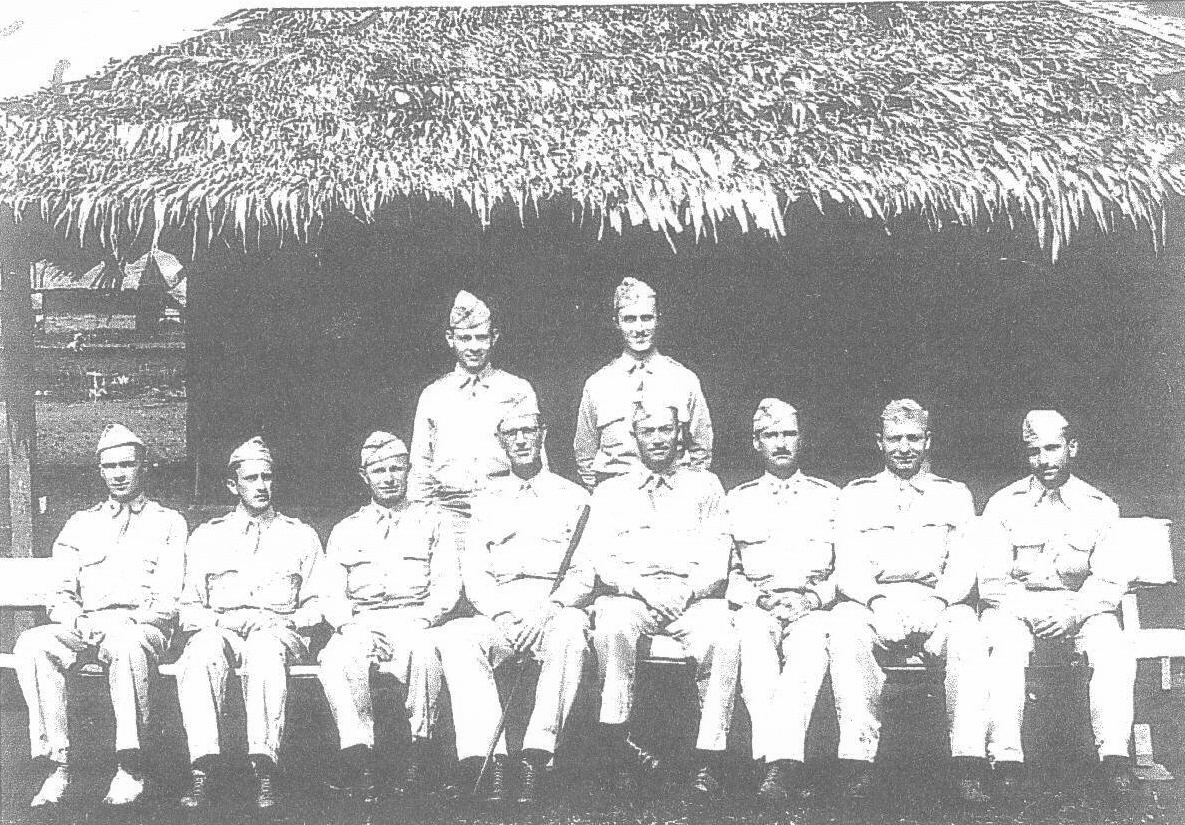
- Mindanao Force General Staff
- Active: March 17, 1942 – May 9, 1942
- Disbanded: May 10, 1942
- Countries: United States; Philippine Commonwealth
- Allegiance: United States Army
- Branch: United States Army; United States Army Air Corps; United States Navy; Philippine Scouts; Philippine Army; Philippine Constabulary
- Type: Corps
- Role: Territorial Defense
- Size: 35,780
- Part of: United States Forces in the Philippines; Visayas-Mindanao Force
- Garrison/HQ: Del Monte Fields; Camp Casisang
- Equipment: M1903 Springfield Bolt Action Rifle M1917 Enfield Bolt Action Rifle; M1928 Thompson .45 ACP Submachinegun; M1918 Browning Automatic Rifle; M1917 Browning .30 Caliber Machinegun (Water Cooled); M2 Browning .50 Caliber Heavy Machinegun; QF 2.95inch Mountain Guns M1935 37mm Carriage Guns
- Engagements: Battle of Davao; Battle of Bogo; Battle of Tagaloan; Battle of Mangayon Canyon; Battle of Cotabato; Battle of Zamboanga; Battle of Malabang
- Decorations: US Presidential Unit Citation; Philippine President
- Battle honours: US Presidential Unit Citation; Philippine Presidential Unit Citation

Commanders
- Notable commanders: Major General William F. Sharp, USA

Aircraft flown
- Bomber: B17 Boeing Flying Fortress
- Fighter: P40 Curtiss Warhawk; P35 Seversky
- Transport: C47 Skymaster; C46 Commando

Mindanao Force was a corps size military unit defending the island of Mindanao, the second largest island of the Philippines, from March 17, 1942, to its surrender on May 9, 1942. The force was created when the Visayas-Mindanao Force was split into two in March 1942. It was initiated in February 1942 in the headquarters of the United States Army Forces in the Far East, but took effect when General Douglas MacArthur departed for Australia on March 17, 1942.

Visayas-Mindanao Force (VMF) commander Major General William F. Sharp assumed command of the force since he moved his previous headquarters in January in that year. He retained his staffs from his previous VMF HQ to his Mindanao Force HQ and released Visayan Force to Brigadier General Bradford Chynoweth. Along with Luzon Force and Harbor Defense of Manila and Subic, both headquarters were to report directly to US Forces in the Philippines HQ in Corregidor under Lieutenant General Jonathan Wainwright IV.

The main mission of Mindanao Force was to protect Del Monte Field and construct more air fields around Mindanao so supplies from Australia could be flown in, in preparation for the relief of the Philippine Garrison by General MacArthur. This was not materialized, due to the grip of the Japanese forces in the Philippines and its surrender on May 10, 1942.

== Background ==
Back in January, General Sharp was able to transfer units from Visayas to Mindanao when he was still commander of Visayas and Mindanao. He was of lack of training of his forces, lack of weapons and ammunitions, and supplies. He brought along 81st Division under Brigadier General Guy O. Fort and ordered to relocate in Mindanao the following units, 73rd Infantry Regiment from Negros, 61st Infantry, 62nd Infantry, and 61st Field Artillery from Panay. He also had forces from Leyte which composed by 81st Infantry Regiment and 93rd Infantry Regiment that wasn't included during the transfer of 91st Division to Luzon. Bulk of the forces are now in Mindanao leaving only one division in Visayas.

=== Force Staffs ===
Much of the Mindanao Force staffs are the same officers of defunct Visayas-Mindanao Force.

- Chief of Staff - Colonel William Thompson, USA
- Deputy Chief of Staff - Colonel Archibald Mixson, USA
- G1 Personnel - Lieutenant Colonel Howard Perry, USA
- G2 Intelligence - Lieutenant Colonel Charles Humber, USA
  - Assistant - Major Lawrence Prichard, USA
- G3 Operations - Lieutenant Colonel William Robinson, USA
- G4 Supply - Lieutenant Colonel Robert Johnstone, USA
  - Assistant G4 - Major Reed Fritz
- HQ & HQ Units - Major Max Weil
- Adjutant General - Lieutenant Colonel William T. Halloway-Cook, USA
  - Assistant - Major Coleman Caruthers, USA
- Inspector General - Colonel Howard Frissell, USA
- Judge Advocate General - Lieutenant Colonel Arch Keever, USA
- Artillery
- Quartermaster - Colonel Melville Creusere
  - Transports - Captain James Knowles
- Engineer - Lieutenant Colonel Wendell Fertig
  - Assistant Engineer - Captain Robert Sly
- Signal - Major Robert Chrisman
- Ordinance - Major William Latimer
- Finance - Colonel William Enos
- Surgeon - Lieutenant Colonel William H. Braddock
  - Dental - Captain Robert Nelson
  - Veterinarian - Captain Oliver Orson

== Defensive plans ==
He divided the island into five defensive sector and place sector commanders on each and combat units to repulse Japanese landings. Zamboanga Peninsula sector, Misamis-Lanao sector, Cagayan Sector, Agusan Sector including Surigao provinces, and the largest Cotabato-Davao sector which covers the southern end of . All reserve forces are posted in the northern part of Bukidnon province.

Lanao Sector which included Misamis Occidental in Zamboanga Peninsula was commanded by Brigadier General Guy O. Fort who also commanded the 81st Division. He had his headquarters in Dansalan, Lanao (now Marawi City). He had 2nd Infantry Regiment a regular Philippine Army unit under Lieutenant Colonel Calixto Duque posted in Cotabato City. 61st Infantry Regiment under Lieutenant Colonel Eugene Mitchell posted in Malabang. 73rd Infantry Regiment under Lieutenant Colonel Robert Vessey was held in reserve to guard northern part of Lanao Province and Misamis Oriental.

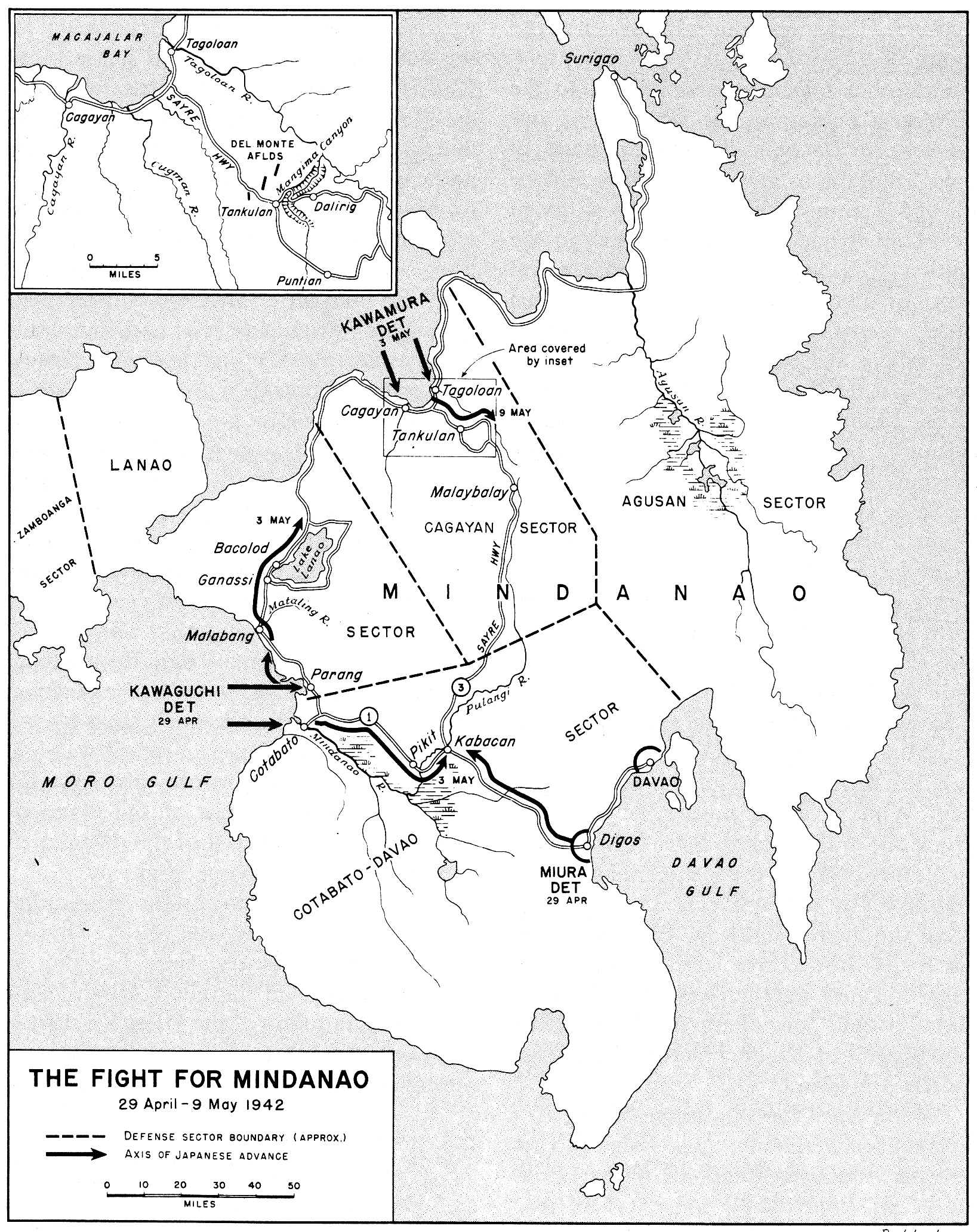

Cagayan Sector was under the command of Colonel William P. Morse who also commanded the newly created 102nd Division. Under his command was 61st Field Artillery under Lieutenant Colonel Hiram Tarkington and 81st Field Artillery Regiment under Lieutenant Colonel John Woodridge, both regiments are fighting as infantry due to lack of artillery guns. 103rd Infantry Regiment under Major Joseph Webb, was transferred from 101st Division sector.

Agusan Sector was under Colonel Ben-Hur Chastaine who transferred from Leyte island along with Leyte Brigade, which has 81st Infantry Regiment under Lieutenant Colonel Ruperto Kangleon, Lieutenant Colonel Arden Boellner took over the command, which later commanded by Lieutenant Colonel William Van Norstrand after Boellner was transferred to Cagayan sector to be the executive officer of newly formed 102nd Infantry Division/Cagayan Sector and 93rd Infantry Regiment under the command of Major John Goldstrap. He had his headquarters at Anakan Lumber Co., in Agusan. Colonel Chastaine posted 1st Battalion, 81st Infantry Regiment in Northern Davao at Camp Kalaw in Monkayo, Davao along with few constabulary, remnants of 82nd Infantry and militia to cover his rear. In February 93rd Infantry Regiment was transferred to Bukidnon designated as Force reserve. It was replaced by 3rd PC Regiment under Lieutenant Colonel Francisco Donesa and posted in Ginoog, Misamis Oriental.

Zamboanga Sector was initially under the command of Colonel William F. Dalton and later his Lieutenant Colonel Alvin T. Wilson who was combat experience in Davao, defending entire Zamboanga peninsula including Sulu Archipelago and expanding Wolfe Field is primary mission of this sector. Major Lawrence F. Prichard became sector executive officer, Major Magnusson was sector engineer in-charge of the construction of Wolfe Field and later Moret field, with the help of Captain R. Winne and Filipino engineer senor Nanac. Later Major Magnusson was relieved by Major George W. Roper to fasten its construction. However, construction of these fields are still on going and never was operational until surrender. With orders from General Sharp, Colonel Dalton with Major Peck and Captain Breitling transferred to Lake Pinamaloy in Bukidnon. Two Philippine Scout Companies also was moved to act as instructors for the infantry and artillery schools being established. Colonel Wilson's assumed command and his force was made of 1st Battalion 102nd Infantry under Major Jose D. Garcia as its commander, 1st Battalion 106th Provisional Infantry Regiment made up of high school and middle school students, Moro Bolo Battalion under Datu Topan, and Constabularies under Major A.P Carandang.

Cotabato-Davao Sector was the largest sector the entire island. It is under the command of Brigadier General Joseph Vachon concurrent commander of 101st Division based in Camp Casisang and later moved to Lake Pinamaloy in Maramag, Bukidnon. He moved again his HQ to Carmen Ferry in Cotabato Province.

- Davao subsector was initially under the command of Lieutenant Colonel Roger Hilsman Sr., at the start of the hostilities. As his troops were disseminated by the Japanese in December 1941, General Vachon sent another unit to cover Digos to Kabacan highway. 101st Field Artillery Regiment under Lieutenant Colonel Reed Graves who is fighting as infantry due to lack of artilleries.
- Cotabato subsector is under 102nd Infantry Regiment commander Lieutenant Colonel Nelson Russell which covers entire Cotabato town and further inland to guard Mindanao River.
- Carmen Ferry subsector which under the command of Major Shamfiner, guarding the main entrance to Bukidnon Province. His troops composed of service troops, air corps (fighting as infantry) and Philippine Constabulary.

Communication Zone is referred as the entire Bukidnon Province which is at the center of Mindanao, it is vital as it moved units and supplies. Lieutenant Colonel Howard Frissell was transferred from Digos sector to Bukidnon to command the sector. Initially, it has 2nd Battalion 82nd Infantry under Major Frank McGee veterans of Davao front. 3rd PC Infantry Regiment was transferred from Cotabato to guard the communication lines between sectors. Colonel Frissell reorganized the sector to have reserves on both ends of the Sayre Highway, 93rd Infantry Regiment was transferred from Agusan sector to Dalirig, Another reserve force 62nd Infantry Regiment under Lieutenant Colonel Allen Thayer was moved via hard march from Lanao to Bukidnon and posted in Puntian. Lieutenant Colonel William F. Dalton was designated as subsector commander which also the commander of the infantry and artillery school in Lake Pinamaloy. Last days of the defensive campaign 61st Field Artillery was transferred to Puntian as 62nd Infantry was moved to Tankulan to defend Magima Canyon lines. Detachment of 43rd Infantry Regiment (PS) under Major Allen Peck also in the sector as they act as instructors of the training school.

== Combat narratives ==
In December 1941 Sakaguchi and Muira detachments with air and naval support from 4th Fleet landed in Davao, there they faced defending troops of Colonel Hilsman. After dispersing the defending troops, Sakaguchi detachment left for Sulu island, only Muira detachment was left and waited for reinforcement. In April it received reinforcements from Palau and intensify its campaign in Davao area. After capturing Panay island Kawamura detachment landed in Tagoloan and Bugo in Misamis Oriental and was met by 102nd Division. After capture of Cebu island Kawaguchi detachment landed in western coast in Cotabato town and Malabang, Lanao. With these three pronged attacks, Mindanao Force was pushed in the middle of the island.

== Surrender ==
After General Homma rejected General Jonathan Wainwright's surrender because it didn't included forces in Visayas and Mindanao. He was forced to order General Sharp to surrender both Visayas and Mindanao Forces as he thinking that the forces in Corregidor will be massacred should hostilities resumed. He sent Lieutenant Colonel Jesse Traywick to General Sharp's headquarters and later to Visayas Islands. General Sharp resumed commanding forces in Visayas too on May 6, 1942, to ensure the order of General Wainwright to surrender. He ordered General Chynoweth to surrender his forces in Visayas.

== Order of battle ==
- 81st Infantry Division – Brigadier General Guy O. Fort, PA
  - 61st Infantry Regiment – Lieutenant Colonel Eugene Mitchell, USA
  - 73rd Infantry Regiment – Lieutenant Colonel Robert H. Vessey, USA
  - 84th Infantry (Moro Bolo) Regiment - Major Jay Navin, USA
  - 2nd Infantry Regiment (PA) - Lieutenant Colonel Calixto Duque, PA
  - Artillery Detachment - Captain Albert Price, USA
- 101st Infantry Division – Brigadier General Joseph Vachon, USA
  - 101st Infantry Regiment – Lieutenant Colonel Roger Hilsman Sr | Lieutenant Colonel John McGee
  - 102nd Infantry Regiment (Less 1st Bn) – Lieutenant Colonel Nelson Russell
  - 104th Infantry Regiment - Captain Henry Macner, USA
  - 105th Infantry Regiment (Moro-Bolo) - Captain Schultz
  - 101st Field Artillery Regiment – Lieutenant Colonel Reed Graves
- 102nd Infantry Division – Colonel William P. Morse, USA
  - 103rd Infantry Regiment – Major Joseph Webb, USA
  - 62nd Infantry Regiment – Lieutenant Colonel Allen Thayer, USA
  - 61st Field Artillery Regiment (Fighting as Infantry) – Lieutenant Colonel Hiram Tarkington, USA
  - 81st Field Artillery Regiment – Lieutenant Colonel John Woodridge
- Leyte-Samar Brigade – Colonel Ben-Hur Chastaine, USA
  - 81st Infantry Regiment – Lieutenant Colonel Arden Boellner | Lieutenant Colonel Robert Van Norstrand
  - 3rd PC Infantry Regiment – Lieutenant Colonel Francisco Donesa, PC | Lieutenant Colonel Roy Gregory
  - Agusan Provisional Battalion
  - Surigao Provisional Battalion
- Zamboanga - Lieutenant Colonel Alvin T. Wilson | Lieutenant Colonel William F. Dalton
  - 1st Battalion/102nd Infantry - Major Tremaine
  - 1st Battalion/106th Infantry - Major Jose D. Garcia
  - PC Company - Captain A. P. Carandang, PC
- Field Artillery Detachment (6 QF 2.95inch Mountain Guns) – Major Paul Phillips
- Reserve Forces – Colonel William Dalton, USA
  - 93rd Infantry Regiment – Major John Goldtrap | Lieutenant Colonel Ben-Hur Chastaine
  - Companies C & E, 1/43rd US Infantry (Scouts) – Major Allen Peck
  - 2nd Battalion, 2nd Infantry (Regular) Regiment - Lieutenant Colonel Calixto Duque, PA
  - Air Corps Detachment

== See also ==
- Philippine Army
- US Philippine Scouts
- World War II in the Philippines
- Luzon Force
- Visayan Force
- Japanese landing in Davao WW II
- AFP Southern Command
- AFP Eastern Mindanao Command
- AFP Western Mindanao Command
