= 105th Infantry Regiment (PA) =

- Active: February 1942 – May 1942
- Disbanded: May 1942
- Countries: Philippines
- Allegiance: United States Army; Philippine Commonwealth Army
- Branch: Army
- Type: Light Infantry
- Role: Special Troops
- Size: 500
- Part of: 101st Infantry Division
- Cantonment: Aroman, Kabacan, Cotabato
- Equipment: M1917 Enfield Rifles; Bolo; Barong; Kampilan
- Engagements: Battle of Digos; Battle of Midsayap

Commanders
- Notable commanders: Captain Paul Schultz

105th Infantry Regiment was a unit of special troops activated and organized by 101st Infantry Division during Japanese invasion of Mindanao island. Irregular soldiers from Moros and local volunteers where trained and put into one unit. During Japanese invasion of Mindanao in Cotabato-Davao Sector.

== Background ==
At the start of Japanese campaign in Davao province in Digos Sector in December 1941, local volunteers and Moros who wanted to fight was group and deployed in the area and making raids to Japanese warehouses in Padada. Due to Moros fighting ability in jungle they are resorted to ambuscades and raids, scaring Japanese and opted not to get into the jungle and stayed at the highway.

1st Battalion was ordered to joined the attack in Digos Sector under Colonel Reed Graves in February 1942, it was routed as they were not trained on the conventional warfare.

== See also ==
- 101st Infantry Division
- 101st Infantry Regiment
- 102nd Infantry Regiment
- 101st Field Artillery Regiment
