= 101st Division (Philippines) =

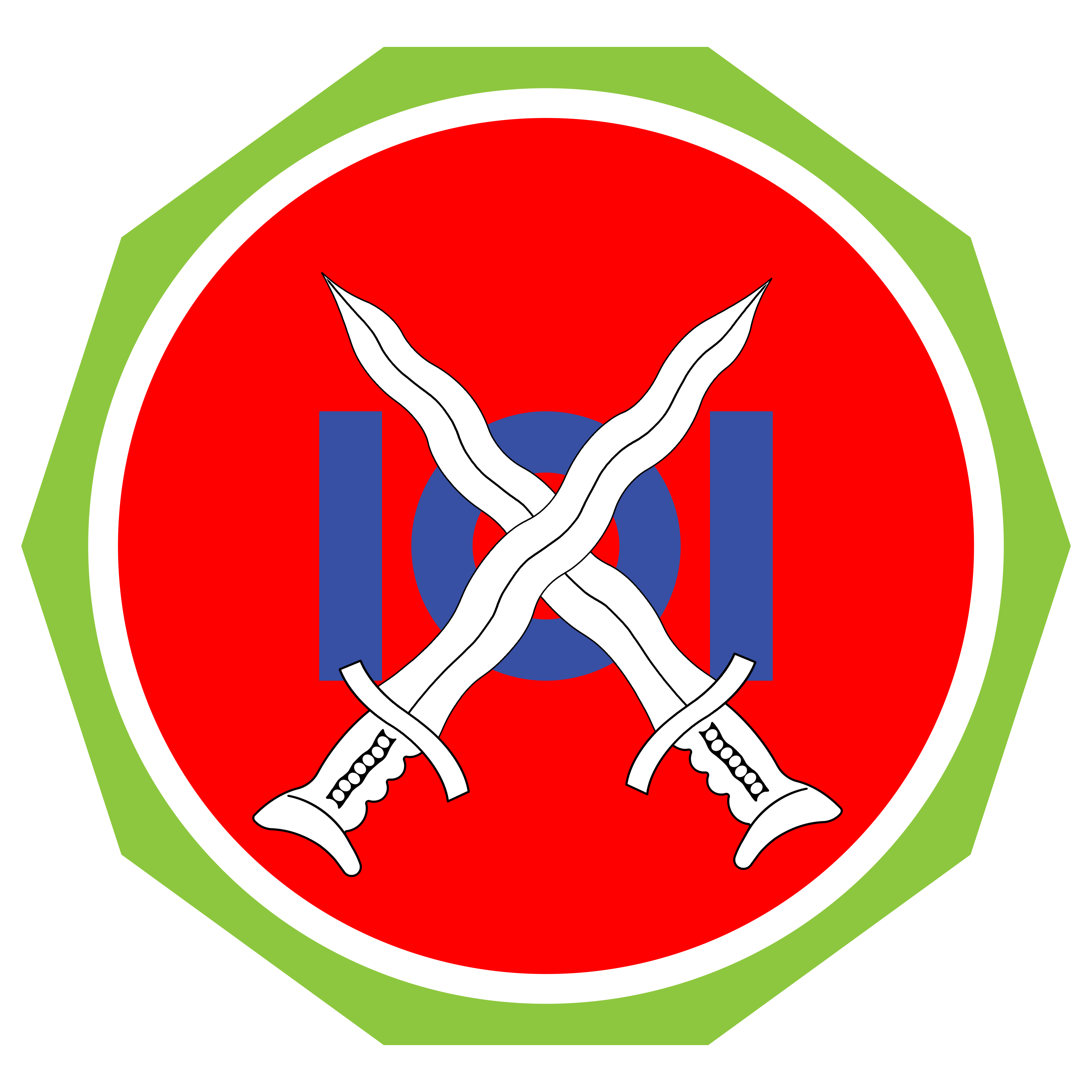
- 101st Philippine Division Emblem 1941–42
- Active: 1941 – 10 May 1942
- Disbanded: May 11, 1942
- Countries: United States of America; Philippine Commonwealth
- Allegiance: United States Army
- Branch: Philippine Army
- Type: Infantry Division
- Role: Territorial Defense
- Size: Division
- Part of: Mindanao Force; Visayas-Mindanao Force
- Garrison/HQ: Camp in Aroman, Carmen Ferry, Kabacan, Cotabato; Camp Casisang, Malaybalay, Bukidnon; Camp Kiethley, Lanao
- Engagements: World War II: Philippines campaign (1941–1942); Japanese invasion of Zamboanga; Japanese invasion of Cotabato; Battle of Digos 1941; Japanese invasion of Davao

Commanders
- Commander: Col. (later BGen.) Joseph P. Vachon
- Executive Officer: Lieutenant Colonel Maguire, USA
- Chief of Staff: Lieutenant Colonel Eustquio Baclig, PA
- Division Staffs: G1 Personnel G2 Intelligence; G3 Operations - Captain Corvera G4 Supply
- Support Staffs: Engineer - Capt. Ross Miller Quartermaster Judge Advocate
- Notable commanders: BGen. Joseph P. Vachon

The 101st Infantry Division was one the reserve divisions of the Philippine Army under the United States Army Forces in the Far East (USAFFE)'s 10th Military district mainly entire island of Mindanao.

== Organization ==
It was active from 1941 to 10 May 1942, whereupon it surrendered after Corregidor fell. It was active in Mindanao initially based at Camp Kiethley in Dansalan (now Marawi), Lanao. Col. (later BGen.) Joseph P. Vachon (USA) was the division's commander, arrived in Mindanao in November 1941. He got promoted Brigadier General in December, he moved the headquarters to Camp Casisang in Malaybalay, Bukidnon. Filipino Col. Eustaquio S. Baclig (PA), a 1918 U.S. Military Academy graduate, was appointed as division chief of staff. In January 1942 General William F. Sharp moved Visayas-Mindanao Force Headquarters in Mindanao, arrived from Cebu and established headquarters near Del Monte Fields in Tankulan, Bukidnon. General Vachon was given the command of Cotabato-Davao sector. When 102nd Division was organized to cover Cagayan sector, General Vachon moved his headquarters at Kabacan in Cotabato at the southern end of Sayre Highway for him to focus in Davao-Cotabato until its surrender.

Division staff was composed of Filipino and American Army officers

- Chief of Staff - Lieutenant Colonel Eustaquio Baclig, PA
- Personnel G1 & Adjutant - Major William F. Maguire, USA
- Intelligence G2
- Operations G3 - Captain Hernando Corvera, PA
- Supply S4 - Lieutenant Cabrera, PA
- Quartermaster - LCol. J.M. Ruffy, USA
- Engineer - Captain Ross Miller, USA
- Medical Officer - Captain Bernardo, PA
- Ordinance Officer - 1Lieutenant Paul A. Sanks, USA.
- Signal Officer - Capt. Juan Bautista, PA

== Combat Narrative ==
After the Japanese invasion of the Philippines in December 1941, it formed part of Visayan-Mindanao Force under Brigadier General (later Major General) William F. Sharp, with headquarters originally in Cebu City, and later under Mindanao Force still under Major General Sharp after Visayan-Mindanao Force was split into different commands as reorganized by General MacArthur before his departure to Australia in March 1942.

=== Preparations and Initial Japanese landings Cotabato and Davao ===
==== Davao subsector ====
101st was tasked to oppose the Japanese invasion in Davao-Cotabato sector one of the five defensive sectors of Mindanao island. It is the only army division in the entire Mindanao Island. After Pearl Harbor Bombing in Hawaii on December 7, 1941. Davao was bombed the following day, on December 9 General Vachon the division commander ordered Lieutenant Colonel Roger Hilsman to Davao to put up a defense. He brought his unit 2nd Battalion101st Infantry Regiment, with Company H (Machine Gun), 102nd Infantry. After reaching Davao on December 10 on 7PM, he setup his headquarters at the PC Camp which was also the headquarters of PC Davao under Major Gregorio Ferreol, PC. Major Frank D. McGee (retired) was recalled to assumed command of 2nd Battalion 101st Infantry, so Colonel Hilsman focus on setting the defense. Lieutenant Colonel Francisco Torres, PC assistant inspector of Mindanao island arrived in Davao and became Hilsman's executive officer. On December 12, 2nd Battalion 82nd Infantry under Major Alvin T. Wilson arrived to reinforce Hilsman. They were posted in southern side of the city covering Daliao-Talomo-Matina road.

On December 20, 1941, Japanese landed in Davao with the support of Davao Attack Force (Naval Fleet) under Vice Admiral, Muira detachment under Lieutenant Colonel Toshio Muira landed in the northern side and Sugakuchi Detachments of 56th Division in southern part of Davao moving towards Digos. Lacking artillery and air support the 101st Division soldiers resorted to delaying actions. Due to stubborn and fierce resistance put up by Colonel Hilsman's troops and the high casualties of Muira detachment, General Sakaguchi has no choice but to commit his reserve force intended for invasion of Jolo Attack Force. Colonel Hilsman pullout his forces out of the city and retreated northwest, where he and remnants has to hike the jungle just to reach Bukidnon. The Davao subsector force has disintegrated and Japanese took a firm hold of Davao Gulf and the Sasa Air Field.

==== Digos Subsector ====
General Vachon ordered two battalions under Lieutenant Colonel Howard Frissell to move out for Davao from Malaybalay to defend Digos-Pikit road. With 3rd Battalion 101st Infantry, 3rd Battalion 102nd Infantry, and a battalion of Philippine Constabulary they setup defense in Digos. Another Japanese landing in Malalag is made by Sakaguchi detachment. Digos commander reported a 3,000 strong and moving towards its way, Frissell pulled out the 3rd Battalion 101st Infantry from Davao to strengthen the position at Digos Junction. Minor skirmishes with enemy patrols took place on 23 December and near Padada Plantation south of Digos on 27th. A battery of QF 2.95inch Mountain Guns under Captain Manuel Acosta arrived in Digos sector giving some psychological uplift of the defending force.

Sakaguchi detachment left for Sulu and Dutch East Indies leaving only Muira detachment to continue its campaign towards Kabacan the southern end of Sayre Highway. However, Lieutenant Colonel Muira was not successful in his drive inland, only his air and naval support prevented his unit not drive back to the sea. Lieutenant Colonel Howard Perry relieved Colonel Howard Frissell who was transferred to Puntian sector to serve as commander of reserve force. Major John McGee who served as Perry's XO was promoted to Lieutenant Colonel and took over the command in March 1942. He was also later replaced by Lieutenant Colonel Reed Graves as commander of Digos Sector in April 1942.

==== Cotabato subsector ====
While no landings sighting in Cotabato subsector General Vachon sent 2nd Battalion (Less Company F & G), 102nd Infantry and 3rd Battalion 101st Infantry under Lieutenant Colonel Russell Nelson and was posted to Cotabato to Kabacan road at the southern end of Sayre Highway. This preventing Japanese from reaching Bukidnon and link with Muira and Kawamura detachments. 101st Infantry Division soldiers lack of trainings, weapons and low on ammunition still defended the Cotabato-Davao sector.

==== Carmen Ferry subsector ====
This subsector was set up to defend Kabacan, where Japanese objective is for its drive north to Bukidnon. It is commanded by Major Shamfiner with troops from 1st Battalion 101st Infantry (Less Company A), Ground crews of 28th Bombardment Squadron (Ground echelon, fighting as infantry), 1st Provisional Battalion 104th Infantry, Company F 102nd Infantry, 101st Field Artillery Regiment (less 2 Battalions), 101st Signal, 101st Quartermasters, 101st Medical, 101st Engineer, 101st Motor Transport, 101st Special Troops, and 101st Service Troops.

=== Japanese landing in Zamboanga ===
In January 1942, 1st Battalion, 102nd Infantry under Captain Arsenio Tolentino with newly promoted Lieutenant Colonel Alvin T. Wilson as Senior Instructor. The Battalion was sent there for training, however the Sector commander Colonel Dalton was ordered to shift to Bukidnon to setup a training school for infantry and artillery. Along with Provisional Battalion, 43rd Infantry (PS) under Major Allen Peck, they transferred to Bukidnon on February 26, 1942. Zamboanga is now under Lieutenant Colonel Wilson with only one infantry battalion and PC units in his force. 1st Battalion, 106th Infantry under Major Jose D. Garcia, is now activated from High School and College boys in Zamboanga Peninsula.

== Japanese reinforcements ==
On April 29, 1942 Kawaguchi detachment of Imperial Japanese Army landed in towns of Cotabato and Parang, opposing them in Parang is 2nd Regular Regiment under Lieutenant Colonel Calixto Duque and Cotabato sector force under Lieutenant Colonel Russell Nelson comprising 2nd Battalion 102nd Infantry, 2nd Battalion of 104th Infantry, and 3rd Battalion 101st Field Artillery (fighting as infantry). Supported by Constabularies and service troops to prevent Japanese from reaching Kabacan the southern end of Sayre Highway. 2nd Battalion 104th put up a stubborn resistance in Cotabato but Japanese aircraft from Zamboanga came to support the invading forces resulting to the battalion being pulled back. Colonel Duque's regiment put up a heavy and strong resistance in Parang delaying the Japanese for hours but was forced to withdraw in a risk of being surrounded as defending forces in Cotabato has already pulled out.

=== Surrender ===
After receiving order from General Wainwright to surrender, General Sharp surrendered his Visayas-Mindanao Force on May 9, 1942.

== Order of battle October 1941 - February 1942 ==
- 101st Infantry Regiment (PA) (LCol. Roger Hilsman | LCol. Howard Frissell | LCol. Howard R. Perry)
  - 1st Battalion - Captain Abellana | Maj. John H. McGee | Maj. Reed Graves | Maj. Earl C. Fransend
  - 2nd Battalion – Capt. Nicolas Gabutina | Maj. Frank McGee | Maj. John R. Richardson
  - 3rd Battalion - Captain Vicente Marabol | Maj. Arlie Higgins, USA
- 102nd Infantry Regiment (PA) – LCol. Russell J. Nelson, USA
  - HQ Battalion - 1Lieutenant Antonio O. Opena
  - 1st Battalion (Transferred to Zamboanga sector) - Capt. Arsenio Tolentino | Lieutenant Colonel Alvin T. Wilson
  - 2nd Battalion - Major William Baldwin, USA
  - 3rd Battalion - Captain Johnson / Captain Floyd Forte / Captain George Bradshaw
- 103rd Infantry Regiment (PA) (Maj. Joseph R. Webb) (transferred to 102nd Division (PA) in Cagayan sector in February 1942)
  - 1st Battalion - Major Robert V. Bowler (transferred to Cagayan sector)
  - 2nd Battalion - Captain Manuel D. Jaldon (remained in Kabacan)
  - 3rd Battalion - 1Lt. William McLaughlin (transferred to Cagayan)
- 104th Provisional Infantry Regiment (PA) - Major Paul Schultz
  - 1st Battalion - Captain William F. Matson
  - 2nd Battalion - Captain John Natola
- 1st Battalion, 105th Infantry (Special Troops) - Major Henry W. Macner
- 1st Battalion, 106th Infantry - Major Jose D. Garcia
- 101st Field Artillery Regiment (PA) – Capt. Abellana | Maj. Powell | LCol. Alexander Quintard | LCol. Reed Graves
  - 101st FA Regt HQ Company (PA) - Maj. Powell
  - 1st Bn/101st FA Regt (PA) (QF 2.95-inch pack howitzers, 8×)
  - 2nd Bn/101st FA Regt (PA) (QF 2.95inch mountain guns, 8x)(guns & ammo never arrived; sunk on the SS Corregidor, 17 Dec 41)
  - 3rd Bn/101st FA Regt - Maj. Reed Graves (PA) (guns & ammo never arrived; sunk on the SS Corregidor, 17 Dec 41)
- 101st Engineer Battalion (PA) - 1Lt. Vicente Simeon | Major Pedro Bitanga
- 101st Medical Battalion (PA) - Capt. Bernardo
- 101st Service Troops Company
- 101st Special Service Troops Company
- 101st Division Units (PA)
  - 101st Division Headquarters & HQ Company (PA)
  - 101st Reconnaissance Company - Captain Nicanor Del Rosario
  - 101st Signal Company (PA) - Capt. Juan Bautista
  - 101st Quartermaster Company (Motorized) (PA)
  - 101st QM Transport Company (Truck) (PA)
  - 101st Ordinance Company - Capt. Manuel A. Mateo
- Attached units
  - 2nd Infantry (Regular) Regiment (PA) - Lieutenant Colonel Calixto Duque
    - 1st Battalion
    - 2nd Battalion
  - 2nd Battalion, 82nd Infantry - Major Alvin T. Wilson
  - Davao PC Battalion - Major Gregorio Ferreol, PC
    - 1st PC Company
    - 2nd PC Company - Captain Claro Laureta, PC
    - 3rd PC Company
    - 4th PC Company
  - Battalion of Volunteers - 1Lieutenant Manuel Jaldon
  - 3rd PC Infantry Regiment - Lieutenant Colonel Francisco Donesa (Transferred to Cagayan sector in January 1942, then to Agusan sector in February 1942)
  - Field Artillery Detachment (3 QF 2.95inch Mountain Guns) - Captain Manuel Acosta

== Post War ==
101st was reactivated in the late 1990s under the Philippine Army Reserve Command as Standby Reserve division, based in Camp Evangelista, Cagayan de Oro City in Misamis Oriental, Mindanao island.

== Notable Soldiers ==
- Salipada Pendatun (later commanded guerilla force in Mindanao, governor of Cotabato 1945 - 1946 and Philippine senator 1962–1967)
- Eustaquio Baclig (Chief of Staff of 101st Division, WestPoint Graduate 1918). Executed by Japanese in 1945.
- Gumbay Piang, Congressman of lone district of Cotabato (1946 - 1949)
- Roger Hilsman Sr., Commander Davao Sector later commanded Negros Force, later chief of staff of Visayan Force for few days.
- Joseph Vachon, Division commander
- Calixto Duque, AFP Vice Chief of Staff 1949 to 1951 and Chief of Staff 1951 to 1953.
- Claro Laureta, Commanded 107th Division, Guerilla forces within Davao until end of war.
- Manuel Jaldon, guerilla leader and later Mayor of Zamboanga City.
- Tomas Cabili, Congressman from Lanao before the war. Became Secretary of Defense and Senator after the war.
- John H. McGee, commanded 1/101st and Executive Officer Digos Sector, POW and escaped to Australia and became Brigadier General.
- Alvin T. Wilson, commanded a battalion in Davao and commanded Zamboanga Sector (MIA)
- Reed Graves, commanded 101st Field Artillery Regiment and Digos Sector (MIA)
- Howard Perry, commanded Digos sector and became G1 Mindanao Force
- Howard Frissell, commanded Digos sector and Reserve Force Mindanao Force
- Frank McGee, retired major but recalled to command 2/101st Infantry in Davao and 2/82nd Infantry in Bukidnon

== Sources ==
- Morton, Louis (1953). United States Army in World War II, The War in the Pacific: The Fall of the Philippines. Washington, D.C.: Center of Military History, United States Army.
- Whitman, John W. (1990). Bataan: Our Last Ditch: The Bataan Campaign, 1942. Hippocrene Books. ISBN 0-87052-877-7.

=== External links ===
- sonsoflibertymuseum.org

== Bibliography ==
- Morton, Louis. The Fall of the Philippines (Publication 5-2) . Retrieved on 14 Feb 2017.
