= John H. McGee =

John Hugh McGee
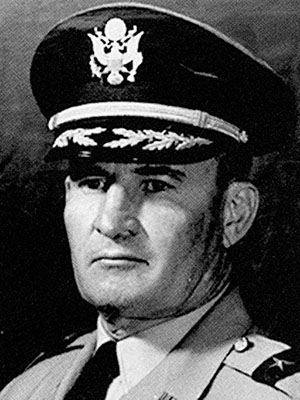
- Born: May 10, 1908
- Died: November 25, 1991 (aged 83)
- Alma mater: Command and General Staff College; United States Military Academy
- Military career
- Allegiance: United States of America
- Branch: United States Army
- Service years: 1931 – 1961
- Rank: Brigadier General
- Unit: Infantry Branch
- Commands: 8th Army United Nations Reception Center 8th Army Ranger Training Center; 8th US Infantry Regiment; 169th US Infantry Regiment; Digos Sector, Mindanao Force; 101st Infantry Regiment (Philippines); 1/101st Infantry (Philippines); Training Center Mindanao, Philippine Army C Company, 43rd US Infantry
- Conflicts: World War II; Korean War
- Awards: Distinguished Service Cross
- Other work: Author

John Hugh McGee (May 10, 1908 – November 25, 1991) was a brigadier general in the United States Army who fought as a guerilla in the Philippines during World War II. He later served upon with distinction upon the staff of the Eighth United States Army during the Korean War, finally retiring after 30 years of service in 1961.

== Background ==
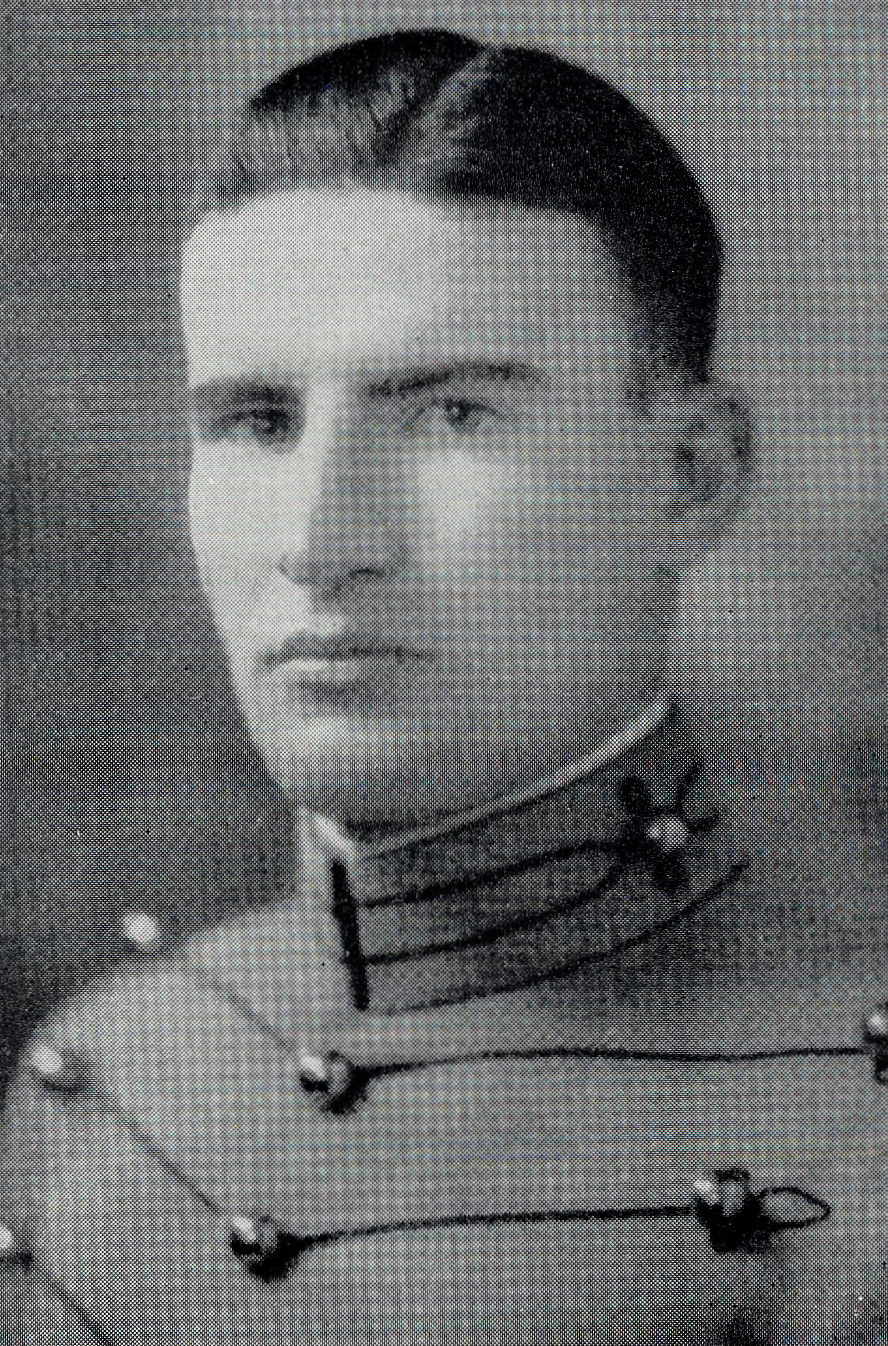
McGee as a United States Military Academy cadet c. 1931

John McGee attended US Military Academy at West Point, New York in 1927, graduating in the class of 1931.

=== Philippine Scouts ===
In 1940 he reported to Petitt Barracks in Zamboanga in southern Philippines, and was assigned to command Company C, 43rd Infantry of the Philippine Scout, composed of Moros.

His experience in training, operating, and commanding indigenous soldiers made the best to command training center for this purpose. He was appointed to command the Zamboanga Training Center setup in barrio Calarian, Zamboanga in August 1941.

=== World War II ===
In December 1941, on orders of BG William Sharp, he was transferred northeast to Bukidnon to command a battalion of Philippine Army. His battalion was assigned to guard Del Monte Field in Tankulan, Bukidnon.

==== Digos Sub-Sector ====
In January 1942, his battalion was placed under 101st Infantry a component of 101st Infantry Division. Transferred to Davao Subsector in Digos where he became executive officer to Lieutenant Colonel Howard Perry and later commanded the 101st Infantry Regiment. He fought the Miura Detachment in February until he was replaced by Lieutenant Colonel Reed Graves commander of 101st Field Artillery Regiment.

==== Surrender ====
In May 1942, he obeyed General Sharp's order to surrender to the Japanese. He and his units surrendered and became prisoner of war on May 10, 1942. He and other American soldiers was reincarcerated in Camp Kasisang, Malaybalay, Bukidnon.

==== Escaped ====
Some American officers including McGee were transferred to Davao Penal Colony, and he was scheduled for transfer to Japan in June 1944 but he escaped. He was rescued by Filipino fishermen and turned over to Captain Claro Laureta, the guerrilla commander of Davao. Laureta arranged for them to move to Zamboanga to meet Colonel Wendell Fertig, another commander of guerrilleros in Mindanao.

He was evacuated along 81 other POW escapees to Australia by United States Navy Submarine, USS Narwal (SS-167) in September 1944. He was sent home by SWPAC Headquarters to recuperate while attended the Command and General Staff College at Fort Leavenworth, Kansas. He was reassigned to command 169th Infantry Regiment a component of 43rd US Infantry Division who was to invade Japan in 1945. The invasion was cancelled due to the dropping of the atomic bombs that forced the Empire of Japan into unconditional surrender.

=== Post World War II ===
He was deployed in Japan for occupational duty for a period but was transferred back to United States. 43rd Infantry Division was deactivated in Camp Stoneman in Pittsburg, California, after its return to United States. He was assigned to training duty capitalizing his experiences during World War II in the Philippines and was Reserve Officer Training Corps (ROTC) instructor at the University of Illinois from 1946 to 1949. He was appointed to command 8th Infantry Regiment under the reactivated 4th Infantry Division (Training) at Ford Ord, California (1949 - 1950).

=== Korean War ===
At the start of Korean War, Lieutenant Colonel John H. McGee was ordered to 8th US Army Headquarters in the Naktong Perimeter of South Korea. He was assigned the Miscellaneous Division of its G3 under Colonel William H. Bartlett, 8th US Army Chief of Operations. It was an assigned where his experience during World War II was put into used as it conducts guerilla operations in North Korea. When Far East Command assumed the responsibility of the guerilla operations in North Korea. He was ordered to organized a commando type unit to infiltrate, deep penetration, and collect enemy information after Far East Command organized 1st Raider Company after North Koreans broke through Nakdong Perimeter. His unit was named 8th Army Ranger Company. He established Ranger Training Center at Gijang, South Korea. The success of his Ranger Training Center led to his appointment to command and established United Nations Reception Center (UNRC) at Daegu University upon orders of Lieutenant General Walton H. Walker commander of 8th US Army. In July 1951 he was ordered to United States to attend the Army War College in Carlisle, Pennsylvania.

== Later life ==
McGee was promoted to brigadier general and was posted in Fort Lewis, Washington. He retired from United States Army in 1961, and was inducted into the Ranger Hall of Fame in 1995. He wrote his book, Rice and Salt.
