= Japanese invasion of Davao =

Part of the Philippines campaign of WW2

Japanese Invasion of Davao
- Part of the Philippines campaign (1941–1942), Pacific Theater
Date	19–25 December 1941
Location	Davao City, Davao,& Jolo, Philippines
Result	Japanese victory

Belligerents
Japan	United States: Philippines

Commanders and leaders
(Empire of Japan) Tanaka Raizo (Empire of Japan) Sakaguchi Shizuu (Empire of Japan) Muira Toshio	(United States) Joseph Vachon (United States) Roger Hilsman (United States) Frank McGee (United States) Alvin T. Wilson (Commonwealth of the Philippines) Francisco Torres (Commonwealth of the Philippines) Gregorio Ferreol (Commonwealth of the Philippines) Nicolas Gabutina (Commonwealth of the Philippines) Luis Jakosalem

Units involved
Ground units: Japanese Fourteenth Army; Sakaguchi detachment; 146th Infantry Regiment; Armored Detachment; Artillery Batteries; Muira detachment; 1/33rd Infantry; Naval units: Japanese Imperial Navy; 2nd Fleet; 11th Air Fleet; Kure Special Naval Landing Force	Ground units: Philippine Commonwealth Army; 2nd Battalion 101st Infantry; 2nd Battalion 82nd Infantry; Civilian Home Volunteers; Philippine Constabulary; Davao PC Battalion; Air units: US Army Air Corps; 28th US Bombardment Squadron

Strength
6,500	2,000

Casualties and losses
700	1,000 2 PBY Seaplanes

The Japanese Invasion of Davao (Filipino: Paglusob ng mga Hapones sa Davao, Jolo at Arkipelago ng Sulu, Cebuano: Pagsulong sa Hapon sa Davao, Jolo ug Kapuloan sa Sulu) and on Jolo in the Sulu Archipelago on 19 December 1941 was one in a series of advance landings made by Imperial Japanese forces as first step in their invasion of the Philippines. The purpose was to cut off the possibility of reinforcements reaching Luzon from the south and to complete the encirclement of American forces there, with the secondary purpose of establishing a base from which the IJA 16th Army could launch an invasion of British North Borneo and the Netherlands Indies . The first invasion of the Philippines was at Batan Island on 8 December 1941. This was followed by Vigan, Aparri, Legaspi, Davao, and Jolo over the next few days

== Disposition of forces ==
Davao City is the economic center of southern Mindanao, and before the start of the war was the hub of Japanese settlement and economic activity in the Philippines. For the invasion of Davao, Major General Shizuo Sakaguchi IJA 56th Division organized two detachments totaling 5000 men. The Miura Detachment, led by Lt Col Toshio Miura consisted of the 1st Battalion of the 33rd Infantry Regiment, and the Sakaguchi Detachment, led by Sakaguchi himself, consisted of the 146th Infantry Regiment, as well as an armored and an artillery battalion. Whereas the IJA 14th Army was in charge of the invasion of the Philippines, Sakaguchi's forces were under the IJA 16th Army and were scheduled to continue to advance south to Tarakan in the Netherlands Indies via Jolo in the Sulu islands after Davao was secured. For the Jolo portion of the mission, Sakaguchi was to be assisted by the Kure SNLF, who has just completed their mission to secure Legaspi.

The area of Davao was in theory defended by 2,000 men of the Philippine Commonwealth Army’s 2nd Battalion 101st Infantry, 2nd Battalion 82nd Infantry, and PC Battalion of Davao commanded by Lt Col Roger B. Hilsman. As with other units in the Philippine Army, the force was only partially trained, and suffered from a serious shortage of equipment, no artillery pieces, and limited ammunition.

Davao was of concern to the Imperial Japanese Navy, as it had an American naval base and was only 500 miles from the major Japanese military center in the western Pacific, Palau. However, at the start of the war, only the seaplane tender USS William B. Preston, with three operational Consolidated PBYs were in the harbor. Unaware of this, on 8 December the Japanese launched an attack on Davao, with 13 B5N1 bombers and 9 A5M4 fighters launched from the aircraft carrier Ryūjō, with the destroyers Hayashio, Kuroshio, Oyashio and Natsushio making a high speed run for the entrance to Davao harbor to catch any escaping vessels. The raid was somewhat of a fiasco, as the Japanese pilots did not even recognize William B. Preston as a warship and only managed to destroy two of her PBY-4s (the other was away on a mission at the time).

== Landing and aftermath ==
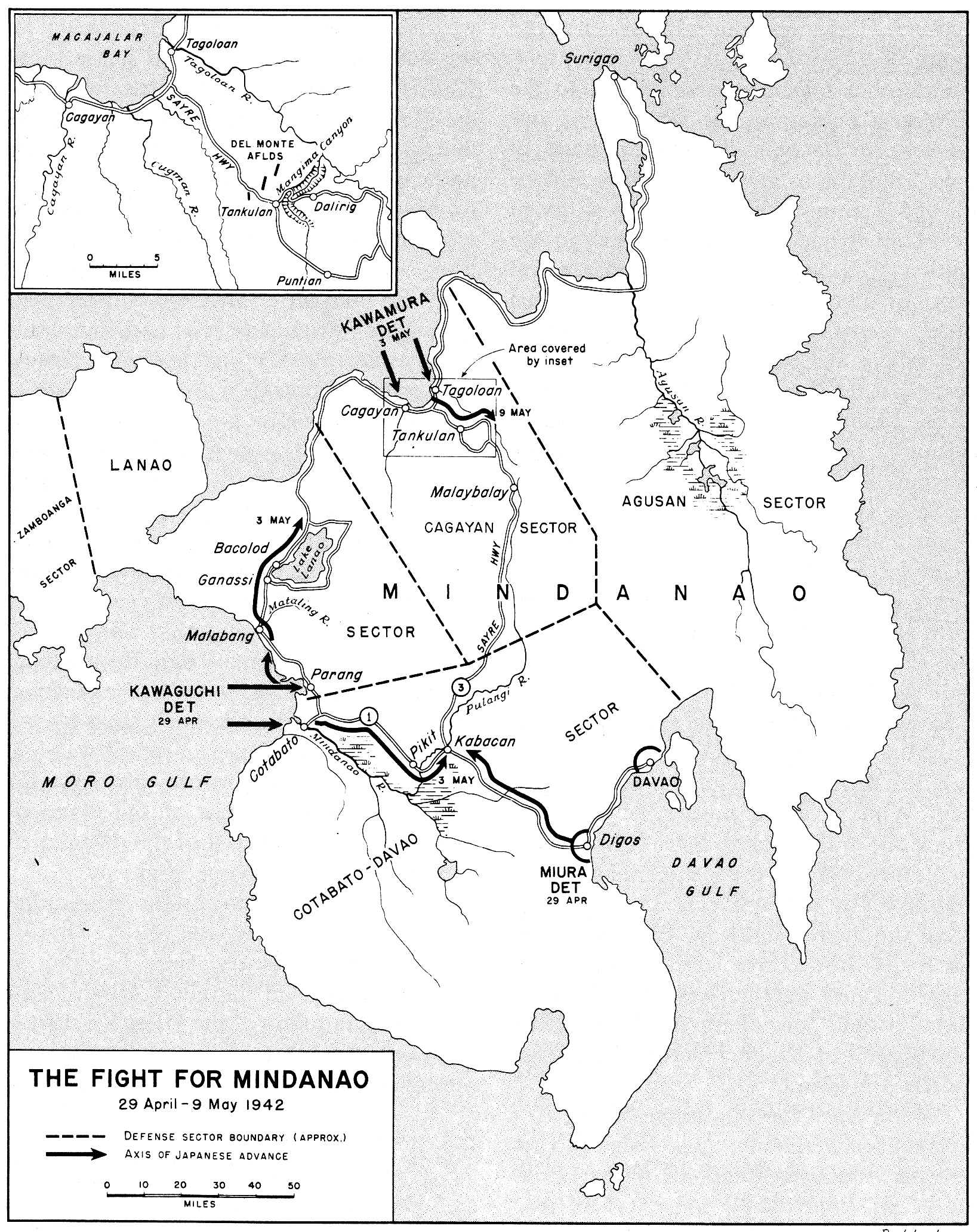
The fight for Mindanao 29 April – 9 May 1942

The Japanese invasion force under the overall command of admiral Raizo Tanaka departed Palau on 17 December in 5 transports, escorted by the light cruiser Jintsu and six destroyers (Amatsukaze, Hatsukaze, Kuroshio, Oyashio, Hayashio and Natsushio), with the aircraft carrier Ryūjō and the seaplane carrier Chitose, and the cruisers Nachi, Haguro and Myōkō providing distant cover. On the afternoon of 19 December, Ryūjō launched aircraft to destroy the radio station at Cape San Augustin, and the Chitose launched reconnaissance aircraft, which flew over Davao.

The Japanese transports arrived at Davao by midnight, and landing commenced from 0400 hours, with the Miura Detachment landing to the north, and the Sakaguchi Detachment landing to the southwest of the city. The only opposition was a single machine gun squad, which attacked the Miura Detachment before it was destroyed by a direct hit by a shell fired from a Japanese destroyer. However, since the Miura Detachment suffered casualties, Sakaguchi was forced to commit reserve forces he was holding back for the Jolo portion of the operation. By 1030, Col Hilsman pulled his men out of the city northwest into the hills. By 1500 hours, the city and airfield were in Japanese hands, and by evening a seaplane base was established to the south of the urban area. On 20 December, as Sakaguchi was reorganizing his forces into nine transports for the landing on Jolo Island, he was attacked by a force of nine USAAF Boeing B-17 Flying Fortress bombers which had launched from Darwin, Australia. Visibility was poor, and the bombers caused little damage. The Jolo invasion force departed Davao of 23 December, reaching its destination on the afternoon 24 December.

Jolo, the capital of the former Sultanate of Sulu, was defended by only 300 members of the Philippine Constabulary. The Japanese landed on the morning of 25 December with no resistance.

== Consequences ==
The advance landings by the Japanese in southern Mindanao and the Sulu island marked further success for them in the overall campaign in the Philippines, and helped secure the region for their invasion of Borneo and further expansions in 1942 such as to the Netherlands East Indies. Davao Force retreated towards Bukidnon on Jungle trails for 14 days before reaching Malaybalay with just eating monkey meat and vegetables.

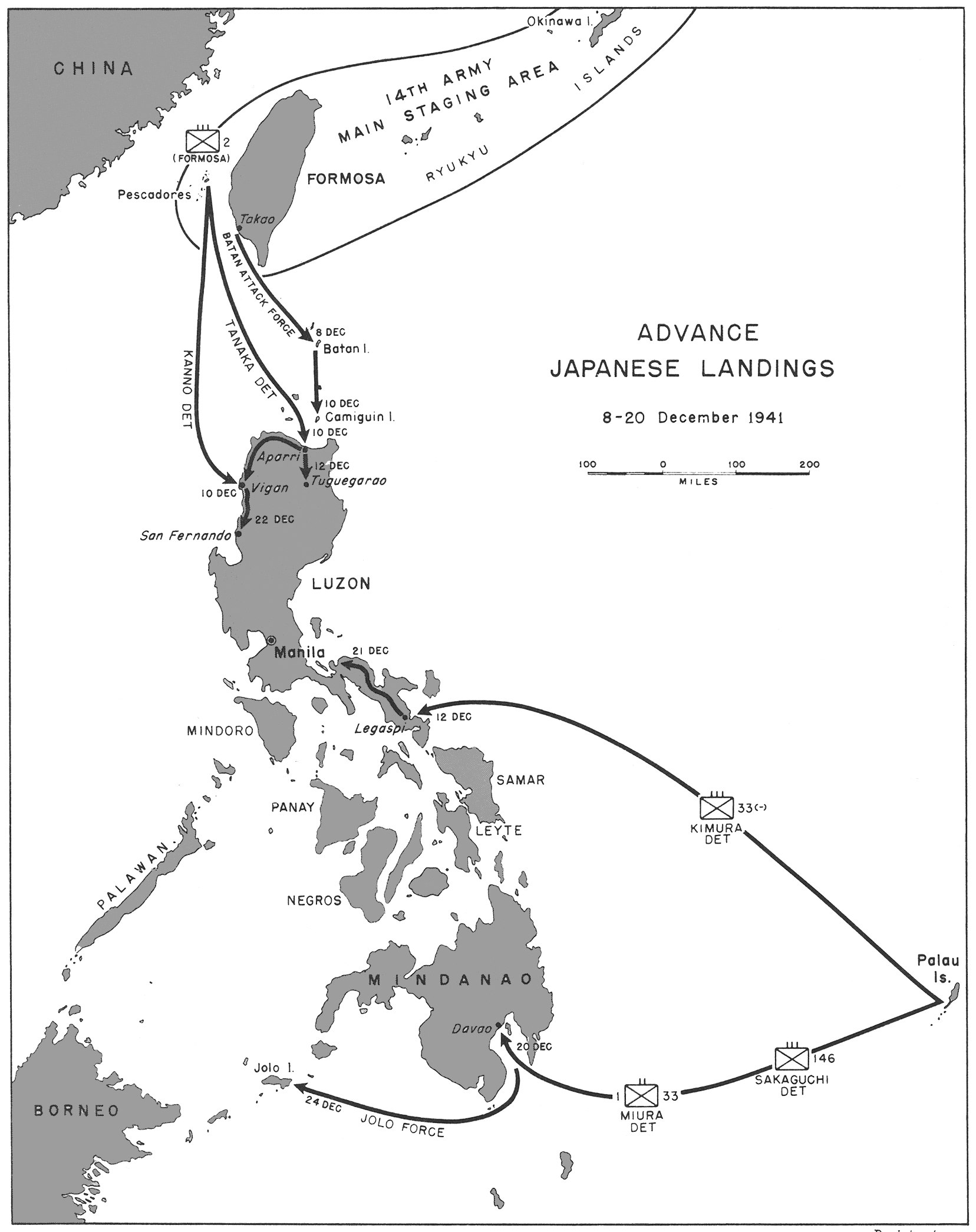
Japanese invasion of Philippines in 1941

== See also ==
- Visayas-Mindanao Force
- 101st Division (Philippines)
- Battle of Digos
