= Claro Laureta =

Philippine Army officer

Claro L. Laureta
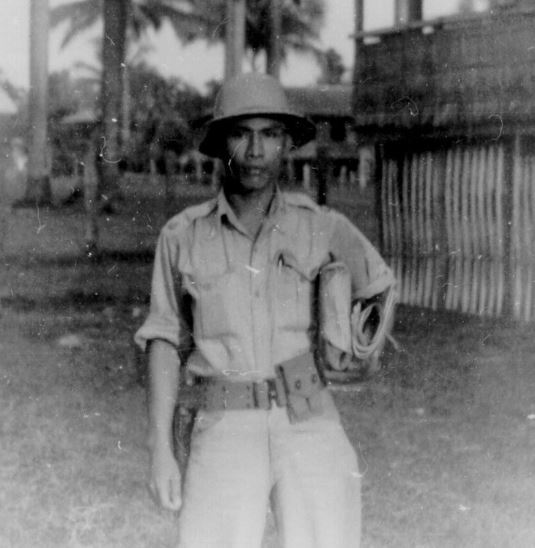
- Born: Claro Lopez Laureta
- Education: Philippine Constabulary Academy (1934)
- Military career
- Allegiance: United States of America; Commonwealth of the Philippines
- Branch: Philippine Army (1942 -1957); Philippine Constabulary(1934–1942); Philippine Scouts(1926–1932)
- Service years: 1934–1957
- Rank: Colonel
- Service number: 0-1407
- Units: 130th Infantry Regiment; 2nd Davao PC Company; 45th Infantry Regiment (PS)
- Commands: 107th Division (Guerilla), 10th Military District; 130th Infantry Regiment (Guerilla Unit); 2nd Davao PC Company
- Conflicts: Epic Battle of Tagum(November 10 – 14, 1944); Battle of Ising (May 3 – 10, 1945)
- Awards: US Distinguished Service Star; Bronze Star; Military Merit Medal

Claro L. Laureta, a military officer of the Philippine Army who commanded guerilla units within Davao Region area during World War II. He enlisted as a private in the Philippine Scouts in 1926 and assigned 45th US Infantry Regiment until 1929. He attended Philippine Constabulary Academy in Baguio and graduated in 1934. He was commissioned as 3rd Lieutenant and assigned to Davao province in 1936. He was commanded 2nd Davao PC Company based in Camp Victa in Kapalong, Davao(now Davao del Norte) in 1941 before the war. He fought the Japanese until when it moved forward towards Monkayo.

When Visayas-Mindanao Force surrendered in May 1942, Captain Laureta refused to surrender and move inland and setup his guerilla force made up of his men in PC, stragglers of USAFFE units, and recruited to augment his unit now named as 130th Infantry Regiment. He is known for securing the safety of POWs who escaped from Davao Penal Colony. When Colonel Wendell Fertig merged all guerilla forces in Mindanao in 1943, Laureta rose as commander of guerilla units in Davao region which is now called 107th Infantry Division comprising with his now with 130th Infantry Regiment and 111th Provisional Infantry Battalion, Laureta was promoted to Lieutenant Colonel and relinquished his command of 130th Infantry to Lieutenant Colonel Saturnino Silva, who came from Australia.

During the liberation campaign in November 1944, 19th US Infantry Regiment of 24th US Infantry Division linked up with 107th Division. and fought Japanese along with the 24th US Infantry Division in Battle of Tagum and later Battle of Ising in May 1945

After the war, he resumed his career as Army officer. He retired in 1957 with the rank of Colonel. With his exploits during World War II he was awarded with various military medals Distinguished Services Star, Bronze Star, and Military Merit Medal.

== Legacy ==
Laureta Elementary School and Laureta National High School in Tagum City, Davao Del Norte is named after him. A bill was passed by Congressmen Alan Dujali renaming Davao del Norte Provincial Police Office Camp in Tagum after him is still pending for approval.

== See also ==
- List of American Guerillas in the Philippines
