= Brazil Maru =

Several ships have been named Brazil Maru including:

- SS Brazil Maru launched in 1919 and sunk in 1945
- MV Brazil Maru launched in 1954
