= 102nd Infantry Regiment (Philippines) =

- Active: September 1941 – May 1942
- Disbanded: May 11, 1942
- Countries: United States of America; Commonwealth of the Philippines
- Allegiance: United States Army
- Branch: Army
- Type: Infantry
- Role: Ground troops
- Size: 1,500
- Part of: 101st Infantry Division
- Garrison/HQ: Camp Casisang, Malaybalay, Bukidnon
- Equipment: M1923 Thompson .45 ACP Submachineguns M1917 Enfield .30 caliber bolt action ifles M1918 Browning .30 caliber automatic rifles M1917 Browning .30 caliber machineguns M2 Browning .50 caliber heavy machineguns 3 inch stokes mortars
- Engagements: Battle of Pikit; Battle of Cotabato City

Commanders
- Notable commanders: Lieutenant Colonel Russell Nelson Major William Baldwin

Insignia
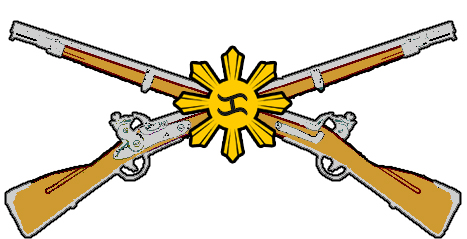
- Identification symbol

102nd Infantry Regiment is a military unit of the Philippine Commonwealth Army during World War II. I was activated in September 1941 and inducted to USAFFE on the same month. It fought under 101st Infantry Division

under Brigadier General Joseph Vachon in Mindanao in Cotabato Province. The regiment did not fought as a unit each of the three battalions fought on different fronts and sectors.

== Background ==
The regiment was activated mostly from recruits of Mindanao, 1st Battalion was organized in Lanao, 2nd Battalion came from Zamboanga, and 3rd Battalion came from Bukidnon recruited from migrants from Visayas islands who moved to Mindanao. Same with other regiments lack of weapons, and ammunitions mired the training of the regiment.

The regiment was commanded by Lieutenant Colonel Russell J. Nelson, with 1st Battalion commanded by Major Alvin T. Wilson who previously commanded 2nd Battalion 82nd Infantry back in Davao Force under Lieutenant Colonel Roger Hilsman Sr., 2nd Battalion 102nd Infantry is commanded by Major William Baldwin, and 3rd Battalion is commanded by Captain Aniano Tolentino.

=== Combat narratives ===
On December 10, 1941, Company H, 2nd Battalion 102nd Infantry was attached to 2nd Battalion 101st Infantry and was brought to Davao City by Lieutenant Colonel Roger Hilsman Sr., they are the first unit that got combat experience of the regiment. It is the fact that majority of the recruits of Company H are from Davao. In December 20, Davao city was attack by Japanese Army, Navy, and Air Forces. Company H, 2/102nd Infantry provided machinegun fire in Tibungco beach where Muira detachment landed.

In December 22, 2nd Battalion 102nd Infantry was sent to Cotabato City to prevent any Japanese landings. Lieutenant Colonel Russell J. Nelson the regimental commander as Cotabato subsector. Along with 2nd Infantry Regiment under Lieutenant Colonel Calixto Duque who is posted in Camp Luna, Parang, Cotabato to guard Polloc Harbor. Together they form the Cotabato subsector force under Lieutenant Colonel Nelson.

1st Battalion under now Lieutenant Colonel Alvin T. Wilson who was a Davao campaign veteran was sent to Zamboanga Sector for retraining of the unit. However, Lieutenant Colonel Alvin T. Wilson was put in charge of the Zamboanga Sector after Colonel William F. Dalton was ordered to transfer to Bukidnon to setup Artillery and Infantry Training School. Command was passed to Major Jose D. Garcia, for 2 months it was the only force in the sector along with PC units as Provisional Battalion, 43rd US Infantry under Major Allen Peck was brought along with Colonel Dalton to serve as instructors in the training school. 1st Battalion 106th Infantry is still being organized out of the high school students of Zamboanga.

3rd Battalion was kept as Division reserve in Carmen Ferry subsector and it was later posted in Midsayap after 103rd Infantry Regiment under Major Joseph Webb was ordered transferred to Cagayan Sector under 102nd Infantry Division.

=== Japanese landings ===
Kawaguchi detachment who subdue Cebu force quickly landed in Cotabato and Parang simultaneously on April 28, 1942. Colonel Nelson had one company in Cotabato City and the rest of his forces are inland at the outskirt of the city, he is worried of Japanese infiltration through Mindanao River and he has no enough troops and transports to chase the Japanese wherever they land.

2nd Kure Special Naval Landing Force landed in Zamboanga sector 1st Battalion 102nd Infantry went to engaged them inside the city but due to combined air, naval and artillery support the battalion needed to retreat the outskirt of the city. General Sharp ordered Colonel Wilson to fight a guerilla warfare with his remaining force. 1st Battalion 102nd Infantry along with 1st Battalion 106th Infantry fought the Japanese in a hit and run tactics and giving them casualties.

=== Surrender ===
On May 10, 1942, both sector commanders Brigadier General Joseph Vachon of Davao-Cotabato Sector and Lieutenant Colonel Alvin T. Wilson of Zamboanga Sector received a radio message from VMF Headquarters in Malaybalay, Bukidnon ordering them to surrender at daybreak on the following day. 2nd and 3rd Battalions 102nd Infantry Regiment surrendered in Kabacan and brought to Camp Casisang in Malaybalay. While the 1st Battalion 102nd Battalion surrendered in Zamboanga sector. The surrender of US Forces in the Philippines is the largest military capitulation of US Military history.

== See also ==
- Mindanao Force
- 101st Infantry Division (Philippines)
- 101st Infantry Regiment (PA)
- 101st Field Artillery Regiment (PA)
