= 103rd Infantry Regiment (PA) =

- Active: November 1941 – May 11, 1942
- Disbanded: May 11, 1942
- Countries: United States of America; Commonwealth of the Philippines
- Allegiance: United States Army
- Branch: Army
- Type: Infantry
- Role: Ground Forces
- Size: 1,800
- Part of: 102nd Infantry Division; 101st Infantry Division
- Garrison/HQ: Camp Casisang, Malaybalay
- Equipment: M1923 Thompson .45 Caliber ACP Submachinegun M1917 Enfield .30 Caliber Bolt Action Rifles; M1917 Browning .30 Caliber Machinegun; M2 Browning .50 Caliber Heavy Machinegun 3inch Stokes Mortars

Commanders
- Notable commanders: Major Joseph Webb, USA; Lieutenant Colonel Howard Perry, USA

Insignia
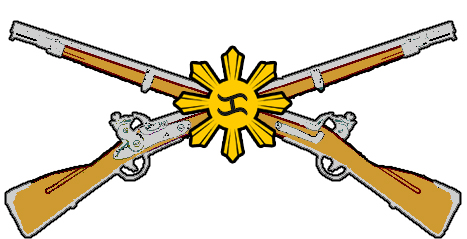
- Identification symbol

103rd Infantry Regiment is a unit activated by the Philippine Army during World War II. I was organized in Mindanao in November 1941 which was not yet ready to fight when the war broke out.

It is the last infantry element of 101st Infantry Division under Brigadier General Joseph Vachon. It is one of the six infantry regiments activated and organized by 10th Military District in Mindanao Island, Along with 101st Infantry and 102nd Infantry where activated in 1941. Later in 1942 104th Infantry, 105th Infantry, and 106th Infantry were activated from volunteers who wanted to serve and fight.

The regiment has the distinction of fighting in two fronts of Mindanao. In Digos Sector at southeastern Mindanao and in Cagayan Sector at Northern Mindanao.

== Background ==
The regiment was still organizing under Mindanao instructor Lieutenant Colonel John W. Thompson, USA. When war broke out in the Philippines in December 1941. 1st Provisional Battalion initially under Major John H. McGee was posted in Del Monte field to defend the air field it was the only combat unit in Cagayan Sector in 1941. 2nd Battalion was posted in Kabacan in Cotabato province and 3rd Battalion was posted in Malaybalay. Lieutenant Colonel Howard Perry commanded the regiment in Digos Sector but was called to VMF headquarters to be one of the staff and was replaced by Major Joseph Webb.

=== Japanese Invasion of Davao ===
When Muira and Sakaguchi detachments landed in Davao City on December 20, 1941, the Davao Force under Lieutenant Colonel Roger Hilsman Sr., after a day of fighting the Japanese invasion did not last due to superior in numbers and weapons. Japanese Navy warships provided fire support which destroys defenders ready positions. Bombs from bombers from the air made defenders easy targets due to lack of air, artillery support, absence of antiaircraft guns, and limited supply of ammunition.

=== Digos Sector ===
Hilsman recommended to Division commander Brigadier General Joseph Vachon to have a troops in Digos to prevent Japanese reaching Kabacan as Japanese will make another front in southern Davao province. Vachon sent Lieutenant Colonel Howard Frissell to Digos to establish defensive front in that front. He brought with him 3rd Battalion, 101st Infantry and 3rd Battalion, 103rd Infantry now under Major Arlie Higgins. A QF 2.95inch Mountain detachment under Captain Manuel Acosta was brought along to provide fire support.

After securing the landing in Malalag, Davao in early January 1942, Sakaguchi detachment left Davao for Jolo, Sulu leaving only a handful of reinforced battalion of Muira detachment under Lieutenant Colonel Muira Toshio. Toshio has not been successful in his drive towards Kabacan due to lack of reinforcements and was just secluded in Davao City and 2nd Kure Special Naval Landing Force in Malalag, Davao and Padada, Davao.

Lieutenant Colonel Howard Perry replaced Lieutenant Colonel Howard Frissell replaced as Digos force commander and the availability of Division special troops ordered several raids to burn supplies and bodegas in Padada, for these resulted Japanese not to intensify its campaigns due to supply. Elements of 3rd PC Regiment joined the fighting along with the ragtag moro warriors augmenting the force. On April 16, 1942, Lieutenant Colonel John H. McGee was promoted and assumed command of Digos Force. 3rd Battalion 103rd Infantry was replaced with 1st Battalion 101st Field Artillery who is fighting as infantry.

On April 10, 1942, Lieutenant Colonel Reed Graves replaced McGee 1st Battalion 101st Field Artillery and 3rd Battalion 101st Field Artillery are the combat units in Digos sector. 1st Battalion 103rd Infantry was placed in Makilala-Kabacan road to prevent Japanese infiltration in Matanao trails. With the help of moro warriors Japanese are not able to infiltrate the road that will cut off the Digos Force.

For three months Japanese was not able to move forward under April 1942 with the additional forces sent to Muira. 1st Battalion 103rd was moved to Pikit, Cotabato to rest and prevent Japanese landing using Mindanao River.

=== Transfer to Cagayan Sector ===
In lMarch 1, 1942, the regiment now under Major Joseph Webb was ordered to Cagayan sector and under newly created 102nd Infantry Division under Colonel William P. Morse, the regiment moved inland along Sayre Highway with its two Battalions the 2nd and 3rd. 1st Battalion 103rd Infantry was left in Kabacan, Cotabato to provide security.

The regiment was posted at Tagoloan, Misamis Oriental on the right of flank of 61st Field Artillery Regiment who was at Bugo Port in Cagayan de Oro City, Misamis Oriental.

=== Japanese Invasion of Cagayan Sector ===
On April 26, 1942 Kawamura detachment under Major General Kawamura Saburo landed in Tagoloan, Major Webb sent two companies to attack the beachhead. It inflicted massive casualties to the invading force and it was so successful that it almost thrown the Japanese back to their ship. Only the retreat of 61st Field Artillery Regiment prevented Webb to throw all his troops to the beachhead. They have to retreat to avoid being cutoff, Webb pull out his men towards Puerto and proceeded to Alea junction to cover the retreat of 62nd Infantry Regiment.

It was posted in Mangima Canyon as sector commander Colonel Morse established another defensive line in Mangima. The 103rd Infantry was posted along the line 1st Battalion under Major Curaming in Talakag, 2nd Battalion under Captain Manuel D. Jaldon in Santa Fe, and 3rd Battalion under Major Robert V. Bowler in Tankulan.

=== Surrender ===
On May 10, 1942, Major Joseph Webb received an order from Colonel Morse the 102nd Division and Cagayan sector commander to surrender at break per order of Visayas-Mindanao Force headquarters. Major Webb has no choice but to order his men surrender but not all went to Camp Casisang in Malaybalay to surrender.

=== Post War ===
The regiment was not reactivated after the war, there was no clear lineage of unit that follows the regiment 103rd Brigade which is under 1st Infantry Division in Zamboanga is based in Camp Ranao, Marawi, Lanao Del Sur. In 1999, Philippine Army activated 103rd Infantry Battalion under 503rd Infantry Brigade based in Camp Melchor Dela Cruz, Gamu, Isabela. However, in 2008 10th Infantry Division was activated and one of its component is 1003rd Brigade which is based in Davao Region.

== American servicemen in the regiment ==
- Joseph Webb, Major, CO Regiment
- Robert V. Bowler, Major, CO 1st Battalion
- William McLaughlin, Lieutenant, CO 3rd Battalion
