= William F. Sharp =

United States Army general

William Fletcher Sharp
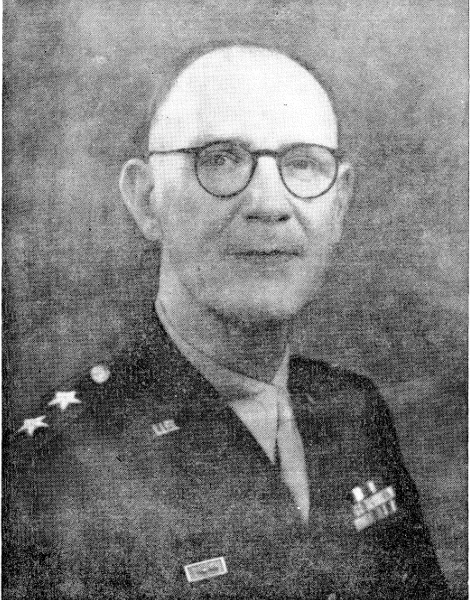
- Maj. Gen. Sharp as Commander of Mindanao Force 1942
- Born: September 22, 1885; Yankton, South Dakota
- Died: March 30, 1947 (aged 61); Fort McPherson, Georgia
- Burial place: Fort Leavenworth National Cemetery
- Military career
- Allegiance: United States of America
- Branch: United States Army
- Service years: 1904–1946
- Rank: Major General
- Commands: 1918-07-10 – 1918-10-24 CO, 11th Field Artillery Regiment, Western Front 1918 CO 78th Field Artillery Regiment, Western Front; 1941-11-04 – 1942-03-04 CG Visayas-Mindanao Force; 1942-03-04 – 1942-04-16 CG Mindanao Force 1942-04-16 – 1942-05-10 CG Visayas-Mindanao Force Philippines
- Conflicts: World War I: On the western front; World War II: Defense of Mindanao and the Visayas (1941-2)
- Awards: Army Distinguished Service Medal
- Other work: Retirement

William Fletcher Sharp (September 22, 1885 – March 30, 1947) was a United States Army major general.

Sharp, a career Army officer, commanded the Visayas–Mindanao Force during the Philippines campaign (1941–1942), and surrendered his command to the Japanese after the Fall of Corregidor. He spent the rest of the war as a prisoner of war, and died shortly after his postwar retirement from the Army.

== Early life ==
Sharp was born at Yankton, South Dakota. He enlisted in the Army in August 1904 and served with Company G, 2nd Battalion of Engineers as a private and corporal. Sharp was commissioned as an infantry officer in February 1907 and transferred to the field artillery in September 1907.

== World War I ==
Sharp commanded the 11th Field Artillery Regiment on the western front in France from July 10 to October 24, 1918. He later was the commanding officer of the 78th Field Artillery Regiment on the western front.

== Between the wars ==
Sharp graduated from the School of the Line in 1922, the Field Artillery School advanced course in 1924 and the Command and General Staff School in 1926. He was promoted to lieutenant colonel in May 1930 and colonel in August 1935.

== World War II ==
Sharp was assigned to the Philippines prior to the outbreak of war. He was promoted to brigadier general and was given a command in Fall 1941. As a brigadier general, Sharp, headquartered at Cebu, was placed in command of the Visayan-Mindanao Force on Nov. 4, 1941, shortly before Japan brought the United States into World War II. Sharp's force lacked many of the supplies it desperately needed and much of the equipment was outdated and not in proper working order. The troops under Sharp also lacked the training they needed to be an effective fighting force. These problems were similar to those faced by commanders on Luzon.

In January 1942 Sharp transferred his headquarters to Mindanao. Gen. Douglas MacArthur sent a letter to Sharp telling him if communications between the two generals were broken, that Sharp was to have the powers of a theatre command so as to continue the resistance to the Japanese. His forces on Cebu and various Visayan islands became autonomous because of Japanese activity that disrupted communications and travel. One important goal was to protect the airfield at Del Monte, in the north-central section of Mindanao. On Feb. 4 a part of Sharp's command was made independent and on March 4, all the islands except Mindanao were made independent of Sharp, making him the commander of the Mindanao Force only. On April 16, Sharp was again made the commander of the Visayan-Mindanao Force, which meant little with much of the Visayan area now under Japanese control. Shortly before he chose to surrender, Sharp was promoted to major general.

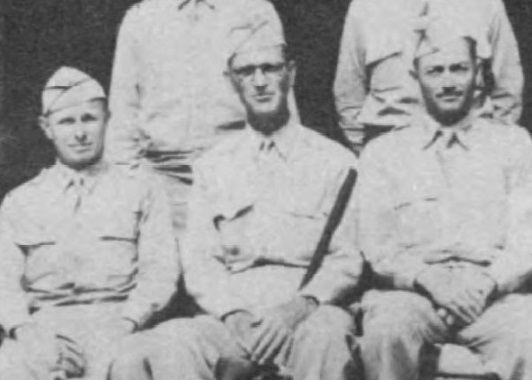
John W. Thompson, William F. Sharp (Center) and Archibald M. Mixson in Visayas-Mindanao Force Headquarters.

Initially a small Japanese force landed and took Davao City on Dec. 20, 1941. The Japanese made some attempts to expand their control, but had little success until reinforcements were sent. In late April major attacks were launched which saw the Japanese take control of much of the south and central parts of the island by May 10. By that time Sharp's force was badly battered, but he still had troops in the field.

On May 6 Lieut. Gen. Jonathan M. Wainwright, who had held out on Corregidor Island for a month after U.S. forces on the Bataan peninsula had surrendered, notified Japanese General Masaharu Homma he was surrendering. Wainwright at the same time sent a coded message to Sharp naming him as commander of all forces in the Philippines, excepting those on Corregidor and three other islands in Manila Bay. Sharp was now to report to Gen. MacArthur, now stationed in Australia. This would cause as few troops as possible to be surrendered. General Homma would not allow the surrender of any less than all the troops in the Philippines and considered the troops on and around Corregidor to be hostages to ensure other forces in the Philippines would lay down their arms. Wainwright then agreed to surrender Sharp's men.

Gen. Sharp was placed in a difficult position. It had been expected his troops would fight on as a guerrilla force. Though Sharp's troops could still put up a fight, he knew if he ignored Wainwright's wish for him to surrender that the hostage troops and civilians at Corregidor could be massacred. In the end, on May 10 Sharp decided to surrender. Sharp's surrender proved problematic for the Japanese, although Sharp and many of his men surrendered and suffered as prisoners of war until liberated in 1945. Many of Sharp's men, the vast majority of them Filipino, refused to surrender. Many considered Wainwright's surrender of them to be made under duress and many ultimately joined the guerrilla movement led by Col. Wendell Fertig.

However, Sharp did not surrender all his men. The names of Filipino new recruits, for instance, were omitted from the surrender rosters and were ordered to return to their homes and bury their weapons. Sharp was at some point sent to a prison camp in Mukden (today known as Shenyang), Manchuria, where he was released in 1945.

== Post World War II ==
For his service in the Philippines from September 1941 to March 1942, Sharp was awarded the Army Distinguished Service Medal. Gen. Sharp, physically and mentally worn down, retired from the Army in July 1946. He died the following spring, when he visited Fort McPherson, Georgia, for a medical checkup. He was in the process of looking for a place to live in the Sarasota, Florida, area just prior to his death.

== Personal life ==
Sharp's wife was Kathryn Lund Sharp, who died July 30, 1955.

== Legacy ==
The story of William F. Sharp, and the struggles in Mindanao for that matter, has gathered little interest in the military history of World War II. Sharp told Col. Wendell Fertig and Father Edward Haggerty he had wished to remain a colonel and had no desire be advanced to general rank. Brig. Gen. Bradford G. Chynoweth, a contemporary of Sharp, claimed Sharp did not have the physical or mental agility to adapt to the unforeseen situation in which he found himself in Mindanao. Chynoweth said of Sharp, "It was pathetic to give him the responsibility of commanding combat or guerrilla operations on Mindanao."

Sharp's decision to surrender was made due to concerns the Americans and Filipinos on Corregidor could be massacred. Sharp did set in motion some of the planning to transform his regular forces into guerrilla ones. He also ordered or allowed fudging of the surrender rosters to allow a number of his troops to escape the surrender and to fight on another day. Most of Fertig's American troops had come from Sharp's command and many Filipino guerrillas had also served under Sharp.
