= Malalag =

Municipality in Davao del Sur, Philippines

- Municipality
- Municipality of Malalag
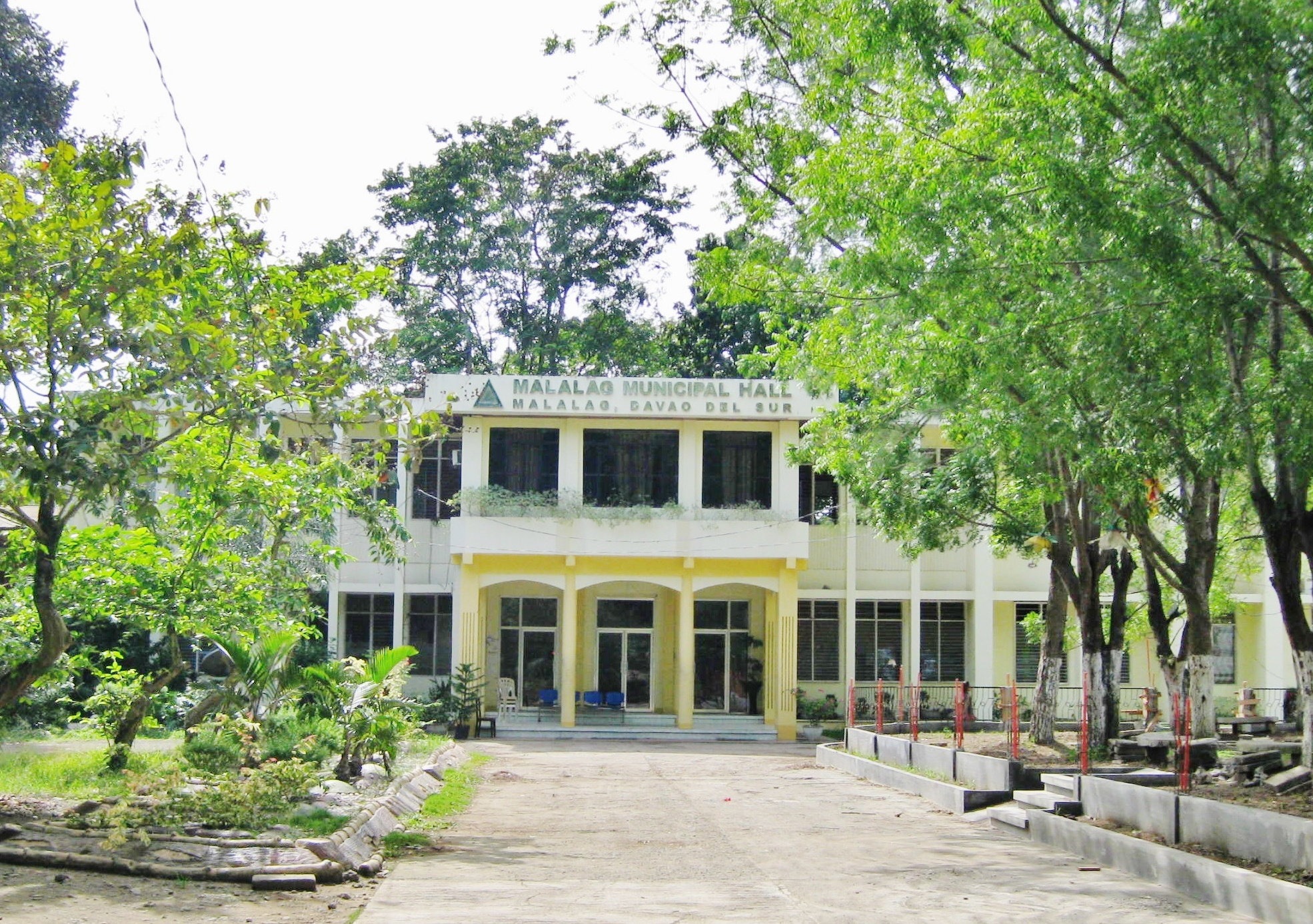
- Old Municipal Hall

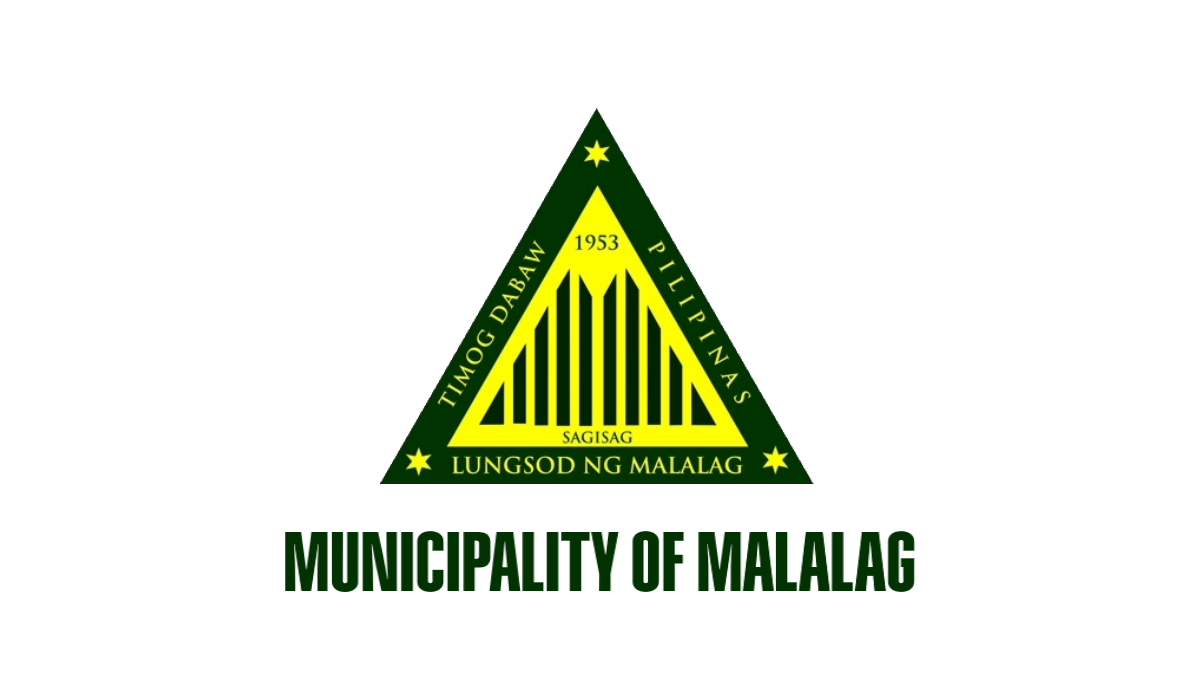
- Flag Seal
- Anthem: Malalagueños
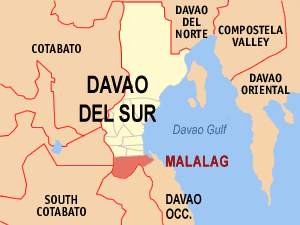
- Map of Davao del Sur with Malalag highlighted
- Interactive map of Malalag
- Location within the Philippines
- Coordinates: 6°35′34″N 125°24′00″E
- Country: Philippines
- Region: Davao Region
- Province: Davao del Sur
- District: Lone district
- Founded: May 28, 1953
- Barangays: 15 (see Barangays)

Government
  - Type: Sangguniang Bayan
  - Mayor: Peter Paul T. Valentin
  - Vice Mayor: Ervin S. Emphasis
  - Representative: Mercedes C. Cagas
  - Municipal Council: Members: Saniel J. Mangubat; Howell M. Medez; Francisco T. Valentin Jr.; Gillen G. Montejo; Rodolfo C. Aringo Jr.; Teresita C. Monroid; Stephine C. Sasuman; Patrocenio S. Alcoba
  - Electorate: 26,106 voters (2025)

Area
  - Total: 186.12 km^{2} (71.86 sq mi)
- Elevation: 27 m (89 ft)
- Highest elevation: 373 m (1,224 ft)
- Lowest elevation: 0 m (0 ft)

Population (2024 census)
  - Total: 40,280
  - Density: 216.4/km^{2} (560.5/sq mi)
  - Households: 11,519

Economy
  - Income class: 1st municipal income class
  - Poverty incidence: 13.09% (2023)
  - Revenue: ₱ 254.9 million (2024)
  - Assets: ₱ 484.9 million (2024)
  - Expenditure: ₱ 226.6 million (2024)
  - Liabilities: ₱ 76.17 million (2024)

Service provider
  - Electricity: Davao del Sur Electric Cooperative (DASURECO)
- Time zone: UTC+8 (PST)
- ZIP code: 8010
- PSGC: 1102408000
- IDD : area code: +63 (0)82
- Native languages: Davawenyo; Cebuano; Kalagan; Tagalog; Ata Manobo
- Website: www.malalag.gov.ph

Malalag, officially the Municipality of Malalag (Cebuano: Lungsod sa Malalag; Tagalog: Bayan ng Malalag), is a municipality in the province of Davao del Sur, Philippines. According to the 2024 census, it has a population of 40,280 people.

Malalag is the agricultural center of Davao del Sur, and its main products are banana, coconut and other fruits and vegetables. Other primary industries include fishing and mining.

== Etymology ==
Malalag derives its name from the color that describes the river running within the heart of the town. The water flowing towards the bay appeared yellowish. The natives referring to the river called it, “malalag nga tubig”, meaning “yellow water.” The distinct appearance of the river attracted migrants to the place.

Some pioneers trace the town's name from a disagreement between a Spanish soldier and Datu Alag, a famous chieftain among the early tribes. It was said that Datu Alag made an appointment with the Spaniard and promised him to be his guide. However, Datu Alag broke his promise and not one of his followers could tell where he has gone. Sensing that he had somehow been tricked, the Spanish soldier became enraged and shouted, “Mal Alag, Mal Alag.” (Bad Alag!) The tribe members confounded by his words kept on repeating it. The same story was told over the generations, so that even settlers coming from Visayas and Luzon became accustomed to calling the place Malalag.

== History ==
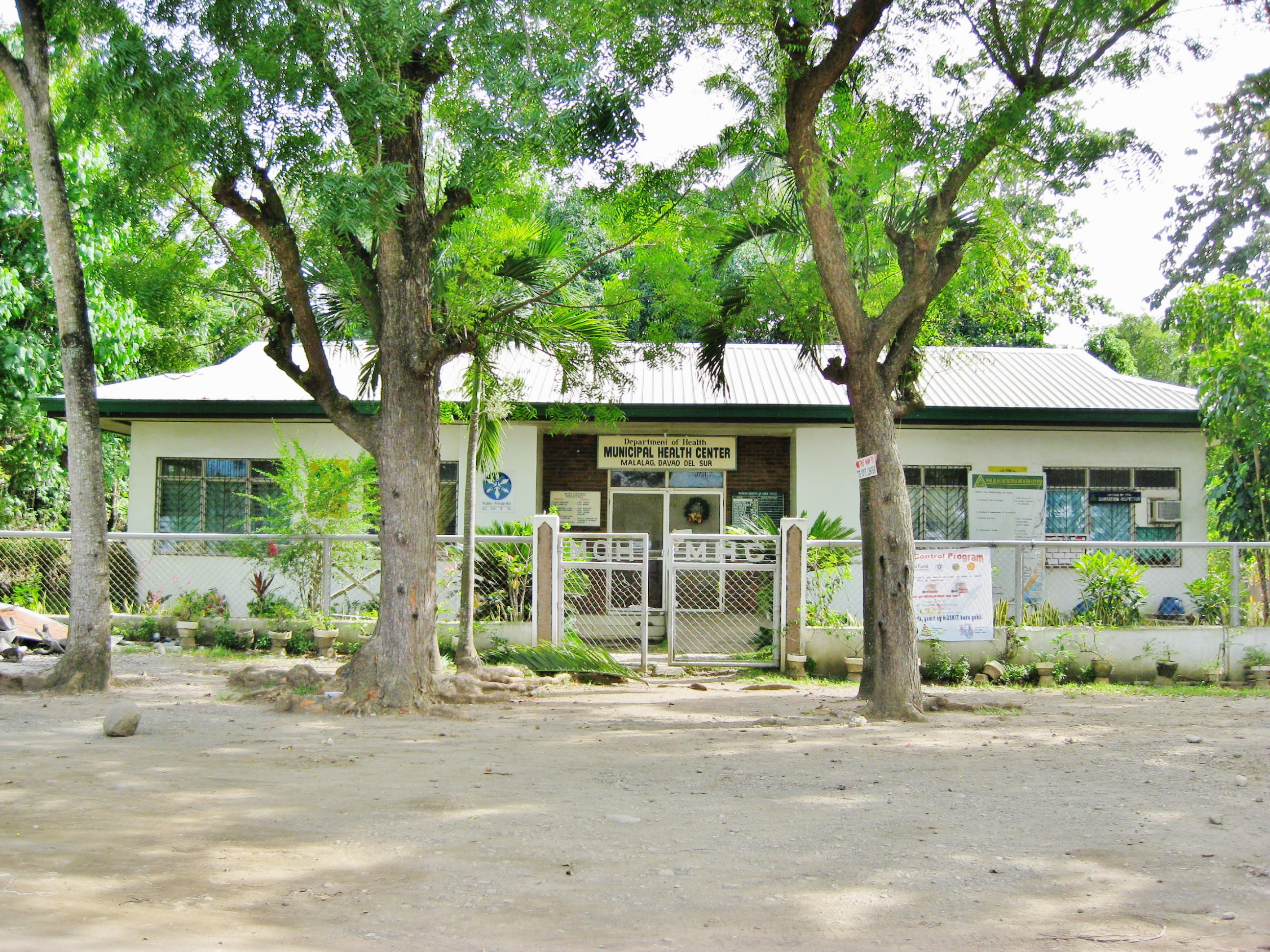
Malalag Health Center

Malalag Bay was previously known as Casilaran Bay, The name Malalag was applied to it some time during the Second World War after a Philippine National Police (PNP) barracks was established. The same area, now known as Crossing Baybay and adjacent to the 434th PNP Mobile Force Company barrack, was a center of commerce with Chinese traders. Also, the Malalag Wharf that is located about a kilometer away used to accommodate three to four sea vessels that loaded products for transport to Visayas.

Malalag became a municipality by virtue of Executive Order No. 596 dated May 28, 1953 issued by H.E. President Elpidio Quirino. This legal document stated that Malalag shall comprise the southern and south-eastern part of Padada and separated from its mother municipality of Padada by a straight west-to-east line passing through the Bolton Barrio Boundary Monument No. 20, Santa Cruz Cadastre 275 Davao. Its boundary on the South was redefined under Republic Act 1008 stating among others that the boundary line between the municipalities of Padada and Malalag shall be from east to west of Balasinon River from the Gulf of Davao to Km. 327 of the Digos-Malalag-Makar Road and a straight line along latitude 6°36' from the provinces of Davao and Cotabato. Even upon the creation of Sulop pursuant to Executive Order 295, the Padada-Malalag boundary as defined in R.A. 1008 was reiterated. For two decades, the boundary dispute arising from the encroachment of the Municipality of Sulop into the territory of Malalag remained unsettled.

Originally, Malalag contained the Poblacion that is the seat of the Municipal Government, Bulacan, Bolton, Santa Maria, New Baclayon and Sulop. At present, it has fifteen (15) regular barangays: Poblacion, Baybay, Bulacan, Bolton, New Baclayon, Caputian, Bagumbayan, Ibo, Pitu, Tagansule, Kiblagon, Rizal, San Isidro, Mabini and Lapu-lapu.

The Municipality used to celebrate "Araw ng Malalag" every 2nd day of July, but by virtue of Municipal Ordinance No. 10 dated May 21, 1990, and consistent with its charter day, the celebration was transferred to May 28. On July 2, 1953, the first sets of local officials were appointed and assumed office, headed by Mayor Col. Antonio Lanzar.

Since 1954, the municipal government has been run by the following elected mayors:

- Felix M. Brandares 1954 - 1959
- Angel Y. Carr 1959 - 1967
- Judge Godofredo Cabahug 1967 - 1971
- Andres B. Montejo 1971 - 1986
- Dr. Zabino P. Zantua 1986 - 1988 (Appointed under the revolutionary government)
- Andres B. Montejo 1988 - 1998
- Givel M. Mamaril 1998–2007
- Roel O. Paras 2007 – 2016
- Peter Paul T. Valentin 2016–present

Malalag also harbors a "Lumad" tribe called "Tagakaolo". It comes from the phrase “olo sa tubig” which means inhabitants of headwater. These places have been the favored dwellings of the Kaolos.

Their traditional territories are in Davao Del Sur and the Sarangani Province. The Tagakaolo tribe originally came from the western shores of the gulf of Davao and south of Mt. Apo a long time ago.

In 1955, the barrios of Basiawan, Kibulan and the sitios of Kimatay and Kilalag were transferred from the town of Malita, Davao del Sur, to Malalag.

== Geography ==
=== Climate ===
Climate data for Malalag, Davao del Sur
Month	Jan	Feb	Mar	Apr	May	Jun	Jul	Aug	Sep	Oct	Nov	Dec	Year
Mean daily maximum °C (°F)	30 (86)	30 (86)	31 (88)	32 (90)	31 (88)	30 (86)	30 (86)	30 (86)	30 (86)	30 (86)	30 (86)	30 (86)	30 (87)
Mean daily minimum °C (°F)	23 (73)	23 (73)	23 (73)	24 (75)	24 (75)	24 (75)	24 (75)	24 (75)	24 (75)	24 (75)	24 (75)	23 (73)	24 (74)
Average precipitation mm (inches)	59 (2.3)	46 (1.8)	41 (1.6)	54 (2.1)	105 (4.1)	159 (6.3)	179 (7.0)	197 (7.8)	162 (6.4)	147 (5.8)	102 (4.0)	65 (2.6)	1,316 (51.8)
Average rainy days	12.3	11.7	12.2	14.5	22.6	25.6	26.6	27.5	25.5	26.0	21.2	16.0	241.7
Source: Meteoblue

=== Barangays ===
Malalag is politically subdivided into 15 barangays. Each barangay consists of puroks while some have sitios.

- Bagumbayan
- Baybay
- Bolton
- Bulacan
- Caputian
- Ibo
- Kiblagon
- Lapu-Lapu (Lapla)
- Mabini
- New Baclayon
- Pitu
- Poblacion
- Tagansule
- Rizal (Parame)
- San Isidro

== Demographics ==
Population census of Malalag
Year	Pop.	±% p.a.
1960	40,153	—
1970	34,764	−1.43%
1975	44,034	+4.85%
1980	44,690	+0.30%
1990	27,709	−4.67%
1995	30,733	+1.96%
2000	33,334	+1.76%
2007	35,241	+0.77%
2010	35,295	+0.06%
2015	38,731	+1.79%
2020	40,158	+0.76%
2024	40,280	+0.07%
Source: Philippine Statistics Authority

The municipality in 1970 had a total population of 34,764 and in the 1980 official result it had a total of 44,690. In 1983, upon the court decision for case 1212 Boundary disputes between the Provinces of South Cotabato and Davao del Sur, there were 6 barangays in the Municipality of Malalag transferred to Malungon, South Cotabato. Consequently, there was a sudden decreased in population during the 1990 census. The population gradually increased from 27,709 in 1990 to 35,241 in 2007.

=== Population and number of households by barangay ===
As of the 2007 census, the municipality had a total registered population of 35,241 with a total of 7,477 corresponding households. Out of the 15 barangays comprising Malalag, Barangay Poblacion has the largest population in the entire municipality (population 6,105) and the highest number of households (1,240 households), followed by the barangays of Bulacan (population 4,277), Baybay (population 3,619) and New Baclayon (population 3,483). Other barangays are moderately populated. Three barangays were identified as urban with a total population of 11,939: Poblacion, Baybay and Bagumbayan. The rural areas at present have a total population of 23,302 with 11 component rural barangays. The barangay of Bulacan is the largest among the rural barangays with a total population of 4,277 followed by Mabini and New Baclayon.

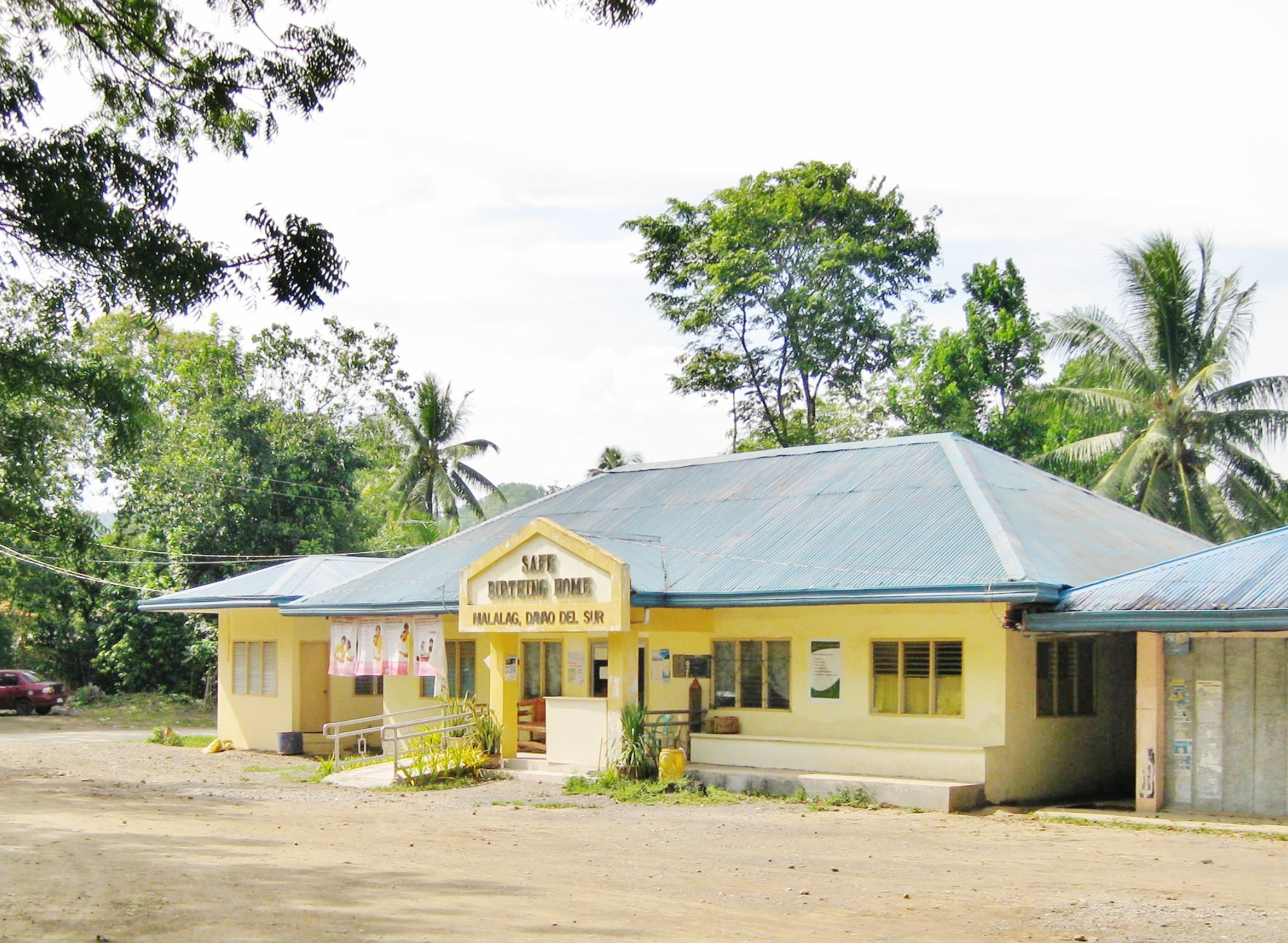
Malalag Safe Birthing Home

Barangay	Population (2007)	Households (2007)	Population (2010)	Urban/Rural
Poblacion	6,105	1,240	6,156	Urban
Baybay	3,483	786	3,790	Urban
Bagumbayan	2,351	455	2,301	Urban
Bolton	1,794	379	1,860	Rural
Bulacan	4,277	874	4,213	Rural
Caputian	1,756	362	1,589	Rural
Ibo	1,842	410	1,763	Rural
Kiblagon	1,228	263	1,127	Rural
Lapu-lapu	385	105	406	Rural
Mabini	2,268	489	2,222	Rural
New Baclayon	3,619	781	3,566	Rural
Pitu	1,960	406	1,965	Rural
Rizal	1,055	243	1,168	Rural
San Isidro	1,519	327	1,498	Rural
Tagansule	1,599	359	1,671	Rural
Total	35,241	7,479	35,295	

== Economy ==
Poverty incidence of Malalag (%)

Source: Philippine Statistics Authority

Agriculture: Among agricultural crops, coconut leads in production followed by banana and sugarcane. Other major crops are corn and vegetables. The municipality also produces high value fruits like mango. Cattle leads in livestock production.

Fisheries: The long coastline of Malalag which forms part of Davao Gulf provides a rich fishing grounds.

Forestry: Tropical evergreen and other timber cover the vast timberland and forest area. Rattan, bamboo and other vines are also in abundance.

Mining: Deposits of copper and or limestone were also traced but still have to be tapped for commercial and industrial uses. The Sagittarius Mines Inc. (SMI) has picked Davao del Sur to host the supporting infrastructure for the $5.9-billion Tampakan copper-gold project and identified Malalag as the preferred site for the PPFP (Port, Power Station and Filter Plant Project) development.

=== Malalag Wharf ===
The Malalag Wharf is along the south-west coastline of Malalag Bay, about 25 kilometres (16 mi) south of Digos and approximately 88 kilometres (55 mi) south of Davao City. It is more than 4 kilometres (2.5 mi) long and 1 kilometre (0.62 mi) wide. Port facilities include:

- 50m wharf
- One berth, 30m x 15m
- Controlling depth of 9m - 12m below MLLW
- Fendering system is of clustered timber files distributed equally alongside the wharf
- Tanks and pipelines for shipment of molasses

Malalag Arrastre Porters and Stevedoring Multi-Purpose Coop (MAPOSTMUCO) are the cargo handling operators of general cargoes such as molasses, sugar, steel products, vehicle and heavy equipment.

Approach for Malalag Wharf is through the Malalag Bay. Ships can anchor at a depth of 21 fathoms free of hazardous underwater obstructions/currents and is notably sheltered from direct exposure to the open sea. Vessels entering the Malalag Port navigate through the south-west route of the Malalag Bay which is a tributary of the larger Davao Gulf waters.

Ships serving the Malalag Port
Vessel	GRT	LOA	Route
M/T Ocean Queen Nine	1058	68.14	Manila-Malalag-Batangas
M/T Alvin	164.88	39	Manila-Malalag-Batangas
M/V Grand Pacific III	498.27	67.37	Davao-Malalag-Manila
LCT Nicia	483.25	68	Ormoc-Malalag-Davao
LCT Jaime Ongpin	497.54	61.4	Davao-Malalag-Iloilo
LCT Filipino	857.94	65.39	Iloilo-Malalag-Cebu
