= Joseph P. Vachon =

American Army general (1887–1967)

- Joseph Vachon in his early years with US Army as Lieutenant.
- Born: 23 January 1887; Westbrook, Maine, United States
- Died: 31 December 1961 (aged 74) San Francisco, California, United States
- Allegiance: United States of America
- Branch: United States Army
- Service years: 1904–1907, 1908–1946
- Rank: Brigadier General
- Commands: 101st Division (Philippines)
- Conflicts: World War I; World War II
- Awards: Distinguished Service Medal; Silver Star

Joseph Peter Vachon (23 January 1887 – 31 December 1961) was a retired United States Army brigadier general. During World War II, he commanded the 101st Division during the Philippines campaign and then spent more than three years as a prisoner of war after being ordered to surrender in May 1942.

== Early life and education ==
Vachon was raised in Westbrook, Maine, where he graduated from Westbrook High School in 1904. He later graduated from the Army Infantry School advanced course in 1928 and the Command and General Staff School in 1929.

== Military career ==
Vachon enlisted in the Coast Artillery Corps in November 1904. He served until November 1907, advancing from private to sergeant. Vachon reenlisted in the Coast Artillery Corps in June 1908, again advancing from private to sergeant. In February 1912, he was commissioned as a second lieutenant in the Philippine Scouts.

In November 1916, Vachon was transferred to the Regular Army infantry and promoted to first lieutenant. He was promoted to captain in May 1917, major in July 1920 and lieutenant colonel in August 1935.

In October 1940, Vachon received a temporary promotion to colonel which was made permanent in May 1941. He assumed command of the 101st Division and then received a temporary promotion to brigadier general in December 1941. His division was assigned to help defend Mindanao during the Japanese invasion of the Philippines. Vachon was imprisoned on Formosa and in Manchuria after capture.

After the war, Vachon retired from active duty as a brigadier general on 31 August 1946.

== Later life ==
Vachon died in San Francisco, California and was interred at San Francisco National Cemetery.

== See also ==
- 101st Division (Philippines)
- Visayas-Mindanao Force
- Mindanao Force
