= 101st Infantry Regiment (PA) =

- Davao Force
- Active: August 1941 to May 1942
- Disbanded: May 11, 1942
- Countries: United States; Philippines
- Allegiance: United States Army
- Branch: Army
- Type: Infantry
- Role: Reserve Force
- Size: 2,000
- Part of: 101st Infantry Division
- Garrison/HQ: Camp Casisang, Malaybalay, Bukidnon
- Engagements: Battle of Digos; Battle of Davao City

Commanders
- Senior Military Instructors: LCol. Roger Hilsman LCol. Russell Nelson LCol. John W. Thompson
- Notable commanders: LCol. John H. McGee, USA LCol. Russell J. Nelson LCol. John W. Thompson

Insignia
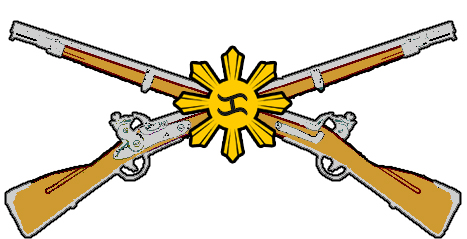
- Identification symbol

The 101st Infantry Regiment was a military unit of the Philippine Army organized during the early stages of World War II. It was composed primarily of Filipino soldiers from Mindanao, but it also included several officers from Luzon and the Moros region and a number of American soldiers assigned to command and train the regiment. The unit became known for its defense of the Davao province in late 1941 and early 1942, where it successfully delayed Japanese advances toward Kabacan for nearly four months, from December 1941 until April 1942.

== Background ==
The regiment was formed in August 1941 in Malaybalay, Bukidnon as part of the 101st Infantry Division under Colonel Joseph Vachon. On September 1, 1941, it was inducted to the United States Army Forces in the Far East (USAFFE) and continued to train in infantry tactics despite severe shortages of ammunition, weapons, and equipment. The 1st Battalion, under the command of Captain Abellana, with its military instructor Major John H. McGee, was sent to the Del Monte airfield to secure it. The 2nd Battalion was led by Captain Nicolas Gabutina, with military instructor 1st Lieutenant John R. Richardson.

Lieutenant Colonel Roger Hilsman Sr. assumed command in November 1941, followed by Lieutenant Colonel Howard Frissell in January 1942. Lieutenant Colonel Howard Perry took over after Colonel Frissell was transferred to the Cagayan sector to command reserve forces on January 18, 1942. Subsequent commanders included Lieutenant Colonel John McGee who took command on February 19. McGee commanded the regiment until he was replaced by Lieutenant Colonel Reed Graves as the sector commander on April 26, who served until its surrender in May 1942.

Key staff included:

- Captain Corvera, regimental operations officer (S-3) and later executive officer
- Lieutenant Doak (31st U.S. Infantry), motor officer
- Lieutenant Leon Tan, regimental engineer
- Lieutenants Felipe, Ong Ping, and Avis, engineer detachment officers
- Captain Bernardo, medical officer

In January 1942, Major McGee was replaced by Major Reed Graves as commander of the 1st Battalion after he moved to the Digos sector to command the 101st Infantry Regiment and became the executive officer of Colonel Perrenior instructoy. The battalion transferred back to the Cotabato-Davao Sector to replace the 3rd PC Regiment. Captain John Richardson became CO of the 2nd Battalion in January 1942, after it was rested and rebuilt after the Battle of Davao in December 1941.

In April, Captain Bradshaw replaced Graves as military instructor of the 1st Battalion after Graves assumed command of the 101st Field Artillery Regiment. Major Earl Frandsen assumed command of the 3rd Battalion after Major Higgins was wounded.

== Combat Narratives ==
The regiment did not fight as one unit due to the lack availability of combat units within Mindanao. On December 10, 1941, General Vachon, commander of the 101st Division and the Davao-Cotabato sector, ordered Lieutenant Colonel Roger Hilsman Sr. to bring the 2/101st Infantry under Captain Gabutina to Davao City and set up defense against Japanese invasion. Along with the 2/82nd Infantry under 1st Lieutenant Luis Jakosalem who came from Cebu, the Davao PC Battalion under Major Gregorio Ferreols, and some volunteers, his force reached more than 2,000.

Despite the large force, Colonel Hilsman did not have field artillery guns, coastal guns, or antiaircraft artillery pieces. Lack of training due to limited supply of ammunition prevented soldiers from firing their rifles. To beef up the leadership, Hilsman called on Major Frank McGee, who was a retired Army officer turned planter in the Malalag area. Hilsman also put Major Alvin T. Wilson in command of the 2nd Battalion 82nd Infantry. On December 20, 1941, the Muira and Sakaguchi detachments landed respectively in Tibungco in the north of the city and Talomo in the south. In less than a day, Colonel Hilsman's troops were routed and forced to retreat via the Davao-Tigatto road. They undertook a 15-day hike through the thick jungle and deep ravines, eating corn, monkey meat, and bananas.

=== Digos Sector ===
After losing contact with Hilsman, General Vachon sent Lieutenant Colonel Howard Frissell to Digos along with the 1st Battalion 101st Infantry and the 1st Battalion 101st Field Artillery. This was to set up defenses in Digos to prevent the Japanese from reaching Kabacan, the southern terminus of the Sayre Highway. He also ordered Frissell to look for the missing unit and Hilsman. Word reached him from moros and soldiers from the unit that straggled in the Davao area that Hilsman had gone to Bukidnon via the Callawa. Upon knowing that the Japanese had made another landing in Malalag, Frissell posted the 1st Battalion 101st Infantry west of Digos, towards Malalag, and the 2nd Battalion 101st Field Artillery to the north, towards Davao City. From January to February 1942, Frissell attacked the Japanese, who landed in Malalag, and their supply warehouses in Padada. A detachment of 2.95inch Mountain Guns under Captain Manuel Acosta was sent from Malaybalay to provide fire support. This small detachment was a moral booster to the Filipino-American defenders. Japanese naval fire and air support prevented Frissell's troops from attacking the Japanese in Padada and Malalag. In the engagement, the Japanese destroyed two of the artillery battery guns and killed Captain Acosta. The unit and guns were withdrawn to Malaybalay as ordered by the Force commander.

He sent commando unit 101st Reconnaissance Battalion under Captain Narciso Del Rosario to raid Japanese warehouses in Padada, resulting in destroying supplies and burning the warehouses. Captain Del Rosario was found severely wounded in this raid and he died of his wounds two days later. In February 1942, Lieutenant Colonel Howard Perry replaced Colonel Frissell as sector commander. He was moved to Dalirig to serve as commander of the reserve force. The 3rd Battalion, 101st Infantry under Major John McGee was sent to reinforce the Digos sector.

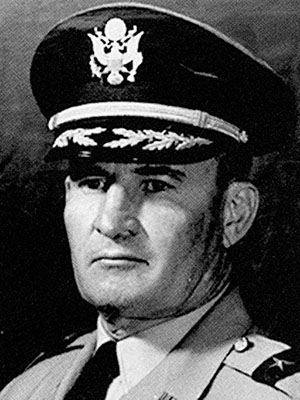
John H. McGee in his Brigadier General uniform in 1960s. He was then a Major when he was regimental executive officer in January to February 1942 and he later promoted to Lieutenant Colonel and became regimental commander in Digos sector after Lieutenant Colonel Howard Perry was recalled in Mindanao Force to serve as G1.

The 2nd Battalion 101st Infantry, now under Major John Richardson, was brought to Makilala from Kabacan to prevent the Japanese infiltrating from the jungles of Padada. In April, the Kawaguchi detachment landed in Cotabato City and the Muira detachment received reinforcements and sent forces from Davao to Digos. General Kawaguchi sent a force via the Mindanao River with their moro guides, which landed in Pikit and reached Midsayap. General Vachon ordered all forces to retreat in Kabacan. The 3rd Battalion 101st Infantry reached Kabacan from Makilala on May 2, 1942. The fighting was intense, but the Japanese failed to cross the Carmen Ferry to reach Malaybalay.

=== Pulled Out to Kabacan ===
The regiment had been fighting since February without let up, and Division Commander Brigadier General Joseph Vachon decided to pull out the 101st Infantry Regiment to Kabacan. The 1st Battalion under Captain John Richardson, 2nd Battalion under Major Arlie Higgins placed in Aroman, and 3rd Battalion under Major Earl C. Frandsen were placed in the Carmen Ferry subsector.

=== Surrender ===
On May 10, 1942, General Vachon received orders to surrender from the Mindanao Force headquarters at daybreak the next morning. All combat units of the 101st Division, including the 101st Infantry Regiment, now under Lieutenant Colonel John McGee, ceased their combat operations and assembled in Kabacan to surrender. However, not all soldiers and officers acknowledged the order. They ran and hid in the hills, mountains, and jungles, waited for the guerilla units to get organized, and joined at the earliest opportunity.

== Notable Filipino Members ==
- Mohammad Ali Dimaporo - Platoon Leader but returned to Lanao after Davao fell and became the aide of General Guy O. Fort. He would be a Governor and congressman of Lanao.
- Tomas Cabili - Congressman of Lanao and Secretary of National Defense after the war.

== American Officers and Enlisted Personnel on Duty in the regiment ==
Regimental Roster

1. Roger Hilsman Sr., Lieutenant Colonel, CO 2nd Battalion, commanded Davao subsector, later sent to command Negros Force, CS Visayan Force, POW, Released in 1945
2. Howard Frissell, Lieutenant Colonel, CO 101st Infantry POW
3. Howard Perry, Lieutenant Colonel, POW
4. John McGee, Lieutenant Colonel, POW, escaped to Australia, returned with 43rd US Infantry Division. Served in the Korean War.
5. Edward R. Mason, 1Lt., Adjutant to Colonel Hilsman
6. John R. Richardson, 1Lt., later commanded 2nd Battalion, 101st Infantry in Digos, POW
7. Felix C. Sharp, 2Lt., assigned to 2nd Battalion
8. M. B. Booth, 2Lt., assigned to 2nd Battalion
9. Milton May, Corporal, later promoted to 2Lt., assigned to 2nd Battalion
10. William R. Collins, Corporal, assigned to 2nd Battalion
11. Allen A. Russell, Corporal, assigned to 2nd Battalion, KIA Battle of Davao
12. Frank McGee, Major, a retired army officer, offered service to Hilsman, and became XO Davao, commanded 2/101st Infantry eventually, later commanded 2/82nd Infantry under Communication zone.
13. Earl C. Frandsen, Major, CO 3rd Battalion, POW, KIA (Brazil Maru)
