= Visayas-Mindanao Force =

- Southern Islands Defense Force
- Active: November 10, 1941 - March 17, 1942; May 7, 1942 - May 9, 1942
- Disbanded: May 9, 1942
- Country: United States of America; Commonwealth of the Philippines
- Allegiance: Philippine Army; Philippine Scouts; Philippine Constabulary; United States Army; United States Army Air Forces
- Branch: Army, Army Air Force
- Type: Infantry, Artillery, Engineers, Quartermasters
- Role: Territorial Defense
- Size: 48,000
- Part of: United States Forces in the Philippines; United States Army Forces in the Far East
- Garrison/HQ: Camp Casisang, Bukidnon; Del Monte Fields, Bukidnon; Fort San Pedro, Cebu City, Cebu
- Equipment: M1935 Transport Trucks Willy MB Jeeps; M3 Scout Cars; M2 Half Trucks; QF9.25inch Mountain Guns; M1932 Browning .50 Caliber Heavy Machineguns; M1917 Browning .30 Caliber Medium Machineguns (Watercooled); M1923 and M1928 Thompson Submachineguns; M1918 Browning Automatic Rifles; M1917 Enfield Bolt Action Rifles; P14 Pattern Enfield Rifles; M1903 Springfield Bolt Action Rifles M1911 Colt 45 Caliber Pistols
- Engagements: Japanese Invasion of Davao
- Decorations: US Presidential Unit Citation; Philippine Presidential Unit Citation
- Battle honours: US Presidential Unit Citation

Commanders
- Notable commanders: Major General William F. Sharp

Aircraft flown
- Bomber: B17 Boeing Flying Fortress
- Fighter: P40 Curtiss Warhawks
- Transport: C47 Skymaster

Visayas-Mindanao Force (Filipino: Hukbong Lakas ng Visayas at Mindanao; Cebuano: Puwersa sa Visayas ug Mindanao) was a military formation created in November 1941 to command all soldiers of the US Army, US Philippine Scouts, Philippine Army, and Philippine Constabulary in the southern islands (Visayas and Mindanao) of the Philippines. Colonel William F. Sharp was appointed as commanding general and was promoted to Brigadier General in November 1941 and later Major General. His executive officer was Major Howard Edmands. He was just starting to organize his command and train his soldiers into a fighting unit when the war started on December 7, 1941.

General Sharp was ordered to organize the coastal defenses, construct more airfields, recruit, and trained soldiers. He took Colonel John W. Thompson as Chief of Staff and Lieutenant Colonel Archibald Mixson as deputy chief of staff to help him organize the command. Along with Lieutenant Colonel Howard R. Perry as G1, Lieutenant Colonel Charles I. Humber as G2, Lieutenant Colonel W. L. Robinson as G3, and Lieutenant Colonel Robert D. Johnston as G4.

Before war started, Visayas-Mindanao Force had five Divisions of Philippine Army, one Battalion of Philippine Scouts and various Philippine Constabulary personnel. However, 71st and 91st Divisions were ordered to transfer to Luzon Island in November 1941 leaving their last infantry regiment who is still organizing. With only 61st Infantry Division under Brigadier General Bradford Chynoweth located in Panay and Negros, 81st Infantry Division under Brigadier General Guy O. Fort a long time constabulary officer, and 101st Infantry Division under Brigadier General Joseph Vachon which are still undergoing training. General Sharp received another order from General MacArthur to move bulk of his forces to Mindanao along with his headquarters. He moved his headquarters to Del Monte Fields in Bukidnon and brought along 81st Infantry Division Headquarters and assigned to Dansalan in Lanao. He also transferred1st Battalion/82nd Infantry to Davao Area, also ordered to transfer to Mindanao are 61st Infantry Regiment under Lieutenant Colonel Eugene Mitchell, 73rd Infantry Regiment under Lieutenant Colonel Robert Vessey, 61st Field Artillery Regiment under Lieutenant Colonel Hiram Tarkington, and 81st Field Artillery Regiment under Lieutenant Colonel John M. Woodridge. Later, Leyte Brigade under Lieutenant Colonel Ben-Hur Chastaine which included 81st Infantry Regiment under Lieutenant Colonel Ruperto Kangleon and 93rd Infantry Regiment under Major John Goldtrap to cover the Northeast area of Mindanao including Northern Davao Province.

== First Japanese landing ==
On December 10, 1941, a Japanese task force raided and landed in Davao with the support of 3rd Naval Fleet and Air Forces based in Palau. They were opposed by defending forces consisting of 2/101st Infantry, 2/82nd Infantry, a battery of 75mm mountain guns from 101st Field Artillery of the 101st Division of the Philippine Army, and few Philippine constabularies under overall command of sector commander Lieutenant Colonel Roger Hilsman after few skirmishes they were overrun and dispersed due to lack of coordination and fire power. Sakaguchi Detachment composed of 146th Infantry Regiment with one artillery and tank battalions under the command of Major General Sakaguchi Shizuo landed the following week to reinforce the Muira Detachment composed of 1/33rd Infantry under Lieutenant Colonel Muira Toshio. When Japanese gained a strong foothold, Sakaguchi Detachment left and landed in Sulu Island in preparation for the Japanese invasion of Borneo where much needed oil was found, leaving Muira Detachment in Davao area.

Colonel Hilsman's 900-strong troops were dispersed to the mountains of Davao and others towards Kabacan. Rogers himself had to endure weeks of hike in the jungle to reach Bukidnon and report back to 101st Division headquarters. Leaving army provincial battalion and constabulary troops harassing Japanese forces. No further major Japanese landings occurred until the fall of the Bataan Peninsula. Lieutenant Colonel Graves assumed command of Kidapawan-Digos sector.

== Split of command ==
On February 6, 1942, General MacArthur decided to take control of Mindoro and Panay Islands which are nearer to Luzon Island to manage the supply route and delivery of supplies. This made him decide that Visayas Islands should be separated from General Sharp's command. This took effect on the General MacArthur's departure to Australia on March 17, 1942.

=== Visayan Force ===
Brigadier General Bradford Chynoweth commander of 61st Division in Panay Island took command of Visayan Force and moved to Cebu, he organized Operation Baus Au in a corps level scale the same strategy while he was commander of 61st Division in Panay Island. General Chynoweth first order of business was to place commanders on Major islands. He promoted Colonel Albert Christie to Brigadier General to assumed command of 61st Division and Panay Island including Romblon and Guimaras. He sent Lieutenant Colonel Carter McClellan commander of 63rd Infantry Regiment to command Negros Island but General Sharp sent Colonel Roger Hilsman who commanded forces in Davao at the start of the hostilities making him more experienced and senior officer than Colonel McClellan. Colonel Hilsman assumed command of Negros Island and Colonel McClellan slide down to be his executive officer. Colonel Irvine Schudder commanded Cebu Island and Colonel Theodore Cornell commanded Leyte and Samar Islands.

After the surrender of Bataan, General Homma has spare forces now to start his campaign in to southern islands. Kawamura detachment invaded Panay Island on April 16, 1942. Kawaguchi detachment invaded Cebu island almost the same day. Due to lack of artillery guns and ammunitions, Japanese easily set its foothold and dispersed Filipino-American forces. Captured all major ports and airfields and bulk of supplies in Cebu, making sure it won't reach beleaguered troops in Corregidor Island. Justice Secretary Jose Abad Santos was captured by the Japanese in Cebu who was making its way to reach Mindanao.

=== Mindanao Force ===
General Sharp activated 102nd Division to cover the defense of Northern Mindanao from units coming from Visayas Islands and provincial battalions. He selected Colonel William P. Morse as commander above the Tagoloan River. Kawamura Detachment invaded Mindanao through Northern Mindanao and Kawaguchi Detachment landed Cotabato and Malabang, Lanao. They were met by Filipino-American forces with fierce fighting but in the end the superior weaponry won and lack of artillery guns and air support made the defenders easily dispersed from their position. General Sharp forces was still fighting and acknowledge he could not hold on much longer and communicated to General MacArthur's headquarters in Australia.

== Reestablishment ==
Following the fall of Bataan in April 9, Corregidor islands was the focus of Japanese intense operations until May 6. General Wainwright still communicated directly to General Sharp for Visayas and Mindanao forces despite General Chynoweth being equal to General Sharp due to separation of commands. On April 19, 1942 with the subjugation of the island of Cebu by the Japanese, the Visayan Force of General Chynoweth could no longer function as a force due to the loss of Cantabaco town where Visayan Force HQ located, it lost communication with other garrisons in the Visayas. Wainwright ordered Sharp to reestablish the Visayas-Mindanao Force to take command of the remaining garrison of the Visayas islands. Before General Wainwright moved forward to seek terms of surrender to General Homma Masaharu commander of the 14th Army he released General Sharp from his command and ordered to report directly to General MacArthur. But later insisted no less the surrender of entire Filipino-American forces in the Philippines before he accepts the surrender. General Sharp was forced to abide the order of General Wainwright due to the pressure that forces in the Corregidor are held hostage and will be massacred should he not surrender his forces. He sent emissary Lieutenant Colonel Jessie Traywick to personally deliver his hand written order and ensure this order are carried by General Sharp. In turn Sharp sent emissaries to General Chynoweth commander of Visayan Force and to other commanders in major islands in the Visayas.

== Surrender ==
General Sharp surrendered the entire forces in Visayas and Mindanao to Japanese on May 9, 1942. Before his surrender he already has a plan for the transition of his forces to guerilla units. He allowed send home the new trainees and bury their weapons, he allowed the roster of his forces abjugated. He ordered his remaining forces to report to Camp Casisang in Malaybalay, Bukidnon for the surrender. Few months later American POWs are brought to Luzon and later sent to Japan via hell ship.

== See also ==
- Philippines campaign (1941–1942)
- North Luzon Force
- South Luzon Force
- Luzon Force
