= 44th Infantry Regiment (United States) =

Four regiments of the United States Army have used the designation 44th Infantry Regiment; one during the War of 1812, one during the Reconstruction Era, one during World War I, and one regiment of the Philippine Scouts.

== War of 1812 ==
44th Infantry Regiment
- Active: 29 January 1813 – 17 May 1815
- Country: United States
- Branch: United States Army
- Type: Infantry
- Engagements: War of 1812: Battle of Villeré's Plantation; Battle of New Orleans

Commanders
- Notable commanders: Colonel George Thompson Ross

The first 44th Infantry Regiment was a regular United States Army regiment of infantry that served during the War of 1812. The 44th Infantry Regiment was on formed 29 January 1813, being recruited in Louisiana. Its colonel was George Thompson Ross of Pennsylvania. On 17 May 1815, it was consolidated with the 2nd Infantry, 3rd Infantry, and 7th Infantry regiments, to form the 1st Infantry Regiment.

== Reconstruction ==
44th Infantry Regiment
- Active: 1866-1869
- Country: United States
- Branch: United States Army
- Type: Infantry

The second 44th Infantry Regiment was a regular United States Army regiment of infantry that served during the Reconstruction Era.

== World War I ==
44th Infantry Regiment
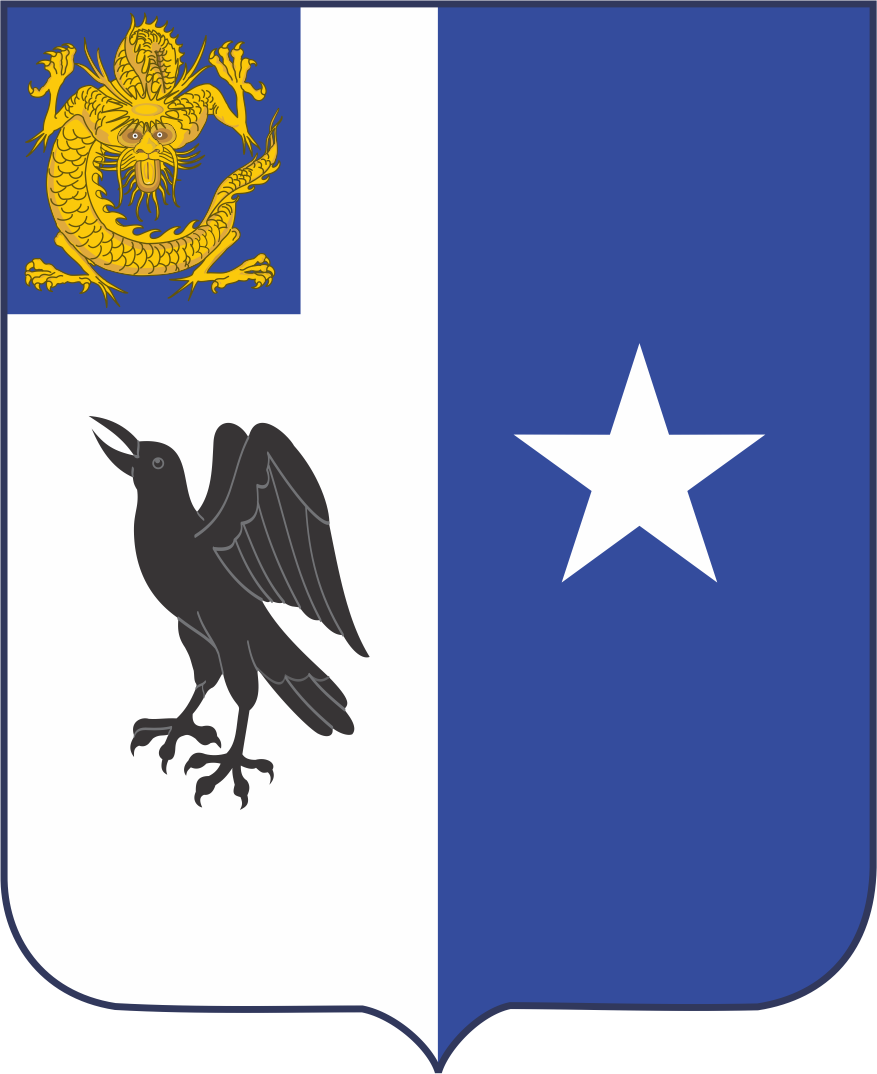
- Coat of arms
- Active: 1917-1921
- Country: United States
- Branch: United States Army
- Type: Infantry
- Motto: In Omnia Paratus (Prepared For All Things)

The third 44th Infantry Regiment was formed in 1917, during World War I. It was organized on 20 June 1917 at Vancouver Barracks, Washington around a cadre of personnel from the 14th Infantry Regiment. The 44th Infantry was assigned to the 13th Division, which was activated on 16 July 1918 at Camp Lewis, Washington. However, the war ended before the unit could deploy overseas, and the 13th Division was completely demobilized by February 1919. the 44th Infantry was stationed at the Presidio of San Francisco, California, as of June 1919 as a separate regiment. It was later transferred to Schofield Barracks, Territory of Hawaii, and arrived there on 25 September 1920. It was assigned to the Hawaiian Division on 1 March 1921, and relieved from the division on 22 October 1921. It was inactivated on 28 November 1921 at Schofield Barracks, and concurrently, its personnel and equipment were transferred to the 21st Infantry Regiment. It was demobilized on 17 July 1922.

=== Coat of arms ===
==== Description/Blazon ====
Per pale Argent and Azure, on dexter side a raven rising Sable, on sinister side a mullet of the first; on a canton of the second an imperial Chinese dragon affronté Or.

==== Symbolism ====
This regiment was organized in June 1917 at Vancouver Barracks, Washington, from the 14th Infantry Regiment, was in the 13th Division in 1918, and in training in the state of Washington. The colors of the shield are the Infantry colors; the raven was the crest of our first President, to denote the connection of the regiment with the state of Washington. The canton has a device from the arms of the parent organization, the 14th Infantry Regiment.

==== Background ====
The coat of arms was approved on 22 April 1921. It was amended to add the dragon to the canton on 5 December 1921. The coat of arms was rescinded (cancelled) on 14 December 1959. There was no distinctive unit insignia authorized for this regiment.

== Philippine Scouts ==
44th Infantry Regiment
- Active: 1946-1949
- Country: United States
- Branch: United States Army
- Type: Infantry
- Engagements: World War II

The fourth 44th Infantry Regiment was a Philippine Scout (PS) unit that was constituted in 1931 but that was not activated until 1946.

During World War I, eight Philippine Scout battalions were grouped into four provisional regiments. They were dissolved in 1920-21 when they were replaced by the creation of the permanent 31st, 43rd, 45th, and 57th Infantry Regiments, into which many of the surviving original scout companies were subsumed. For example, the "2nd Company, Native Scouts, Macabebes" of 1901, eventually became Company D, 45th Infantry Regiment (PS), on 2 December 1920.

During World War I, the Philippine Assembly had created the Philippine National Guard, which it offered to augment the AEF (American Expeditionary Force) under John J. Pershing. The force grew to 25,000 men, but it never left the Philippines. However, a few Filipino soldiers did see action. After the war, the Philippine National Guard was deactivated and its officers were placed on a Reserve list. At the same time as the creation of the Philippine Scout infantry regiments, some of the scout companies that had formed a provisional artillery unit in 1918 were converted into Batteries of the 24th Field Artillery Regt (PS). A number of other scout companies were mustered out or demobilized in 1920-1921 and their personnel transferred to create wholly new units; 25th Field Artillery Regiment (PS), 91st & 92nd Coast Artillery Regiment (PS) and the 26th Cavalry Regiment (PS), service and support units were organized in the Engineer, Medical, Military Police, and Quartermaster branches. In 1921, many of the infantry and field artillery regiments were grouped together to form the U.S. Army's Philippine Division. From this point onward, the Scouts became the U.S. Army's first line of land defense in the western Pacific.

The 44th Infantry Regiment (PS) was constituted in the Regular Army on 26 June 1931, allotted to the Philippine Department, and assigned on paper to the Philippine Division, but it was not organized before the outbreak of World War II and was disbanded on 11 November 1944. The Philippine Division was redesignated the 12th Infantry Division (PS) and reactivated in 1946, primarily to compensate for the demobilization of U.S. Army units. The 44th Infantry Regiment (PS) was reformed for occupation duty on Okinawa and inactivated in 1949.
