= Back to Bataan =

1945 film by Edward Dmytryk

- Theatrical release poster
- Directed by: Edward Dmytryk
- Screenplay by: Ben Barzman; Richard H. Landau
- Story by: Aeneas MacKenzie; William Gordon
- Produced by: Robert Fellows (exec.)
- Starring: John Wayne; Anthony Quinn; Beulah Bondi; Fely Franquelli; Leonard Strong
- Cinematography: Nicholas Musuraca
- Edited by: Marston Fay
- Music by: Roy Webb
- Production company: RKO Radio Pictures
- Distributed by: RKO Radio Pictures (US)
- Release dates: May 31, 1945 (United States); June 25, 1945 (Boston-Premiere); June 25, 1945 (Honolulu-Premiere)
- Running time: 95 minutes
- Country: United States
- Language: English
- Box office: $2,490,000

Back to Bataan is a 1945 American black-and-white World War II war film drama from RKO Radio Pictures, produced by Robert Fellows, directed by Edward Dmytryk, that stars John Wayne and Anthony Quinn. The film depicts events (some fictionalized and some actual) that took place after the Battle of Bataan (1941–42) on the island of Luzon in the Philippines. The working title of the film was The Invisible Army.

== Plot ==
In 1945 US Army Rangers raid the Cabanatuan Japanese prisoner-of-war camp, rescuing its POWs. The film flashes back to March 1942, and the Bataan peninsula in the Philippines.

As U.S. Army troops under General MacArthur struggle to hold Bataan against the Japanese, Colonel Joseph Madden must deal with one of his officers. Captain Andrés Bonifacio has been under strain because his sweetheart Dalisay Delgado is apparently collaborating with the Japanese, broadcasting propaganda over the radio. When Madden is picked to infiltrate behind the lines to organize Filipinos to fight as guerrillas, his commanding officer reveals Delgado is using the propaganda broadcasts to secretly transmit valuable information to the guerrillas. Madden is ordered not to reveal that fact, not even to Bonifacio.

Madden makes contact with one group of Filipino resistance fighters. They encounter middle-aged American school teacher Bertha Barnes who joins the guerrillas with her students after the Japanese hang Buenaventura Bello, the principal of her school and a dear friend, for refusing to take down the American flag. On their first mission to destroy a Japanese gasoline dump, Madden's men stumble upon the Bataan Death March and realize that Bataan has fallen. Many of the Filipinos lose heart, so Madden engineers the rescue of Captain Bonifacio from the Death March. Bonifacio is the fictional grandson of Andrés Bonifacio, a national hero. The plan succeeds and the guerrillas hang the Japanese officer who ordered the killing of Bello. During the next year, Madden's guerrillas attack Japanese outposts, supply depots, military airfields, and other installations.

Major Hasko, one of the Japanese commanders, attempts to appease the local population by staging a semi-independence ceremony to reduce popular support for the Filipino resistance. Madden, Bonifacio, and the guerrillas attack the ceremony, where Dalisay finally reveals her true alliance during her radio broadcast: She urges her people to rise up against the Japanese. Most of the Japanese troops are killed in the raid, but a Filipino student named Maximo Cuenca is captured. After being beaten, he agrees to lead the Japanese to Madden's hideout. However, as they near that spot, Maximo, sitting in the front seat of a Japanese transport truck, suddenly grabs the steering wheel, sending it careening down a mountainside. He later dies in the arms of Miss Barnes.

When Colonel Madden is ordered out of the field, Captain Bonifacio takes command of the Filipino resistance. Several months later, in October 1944, Bonifácio and his group travel to Leyte, where rumors circulate of an impending American invasion to liberate the Philippines. Bonifacio is reunited with Madden on a beach at Leyte, coming ashore from a submarine with Lieutenant-Commander Waite (Lawrence Tierney), a U.S. naval officer. Waite orders Bonifacio and Madden to secure a small village to prevent Japanese reinforcements from repelling the impending American landings.

Madden, Bonifacio, and their men defeat the Japanese garrison in a fierce pitched battle. Colonel Korok escapes on a motorcycle to spread the alarm, and Japanese tanks and soldiers counter-attack. The defenders manage to knock out most of the tanks, but American reinforcements and tanks arrive to turn the tide of battle.

The film ends with another short montage, this time showing several of the actual released Americans from the Cabanatuan prison camp.

== Cast ==
- John Wayne as Col. Joseph Madden
- Anthony Quinn as Capt. Andrés Bonifacio Jr.
- Beulah Bondi as Bertha Barnes
- Fely Franquelli as Dalisay Delgado
- Richard Loo as Maj. Hasko
- Philip Ahn as Col. Koroki (Japanese: 陸軍大佐コロキ, Rikugun-Taisa Koroki)
- Alex Havier as Sgt. Bernessa
- 'Ducky' Louie as Máximo Cuenca
- Lawrence Tierney as Lt. Cmdr. Waite
- Leonard Strong as Lieutenant General Masaharu Homma (Japanese: 本間雅晴, Homma Masaharu)
- Paul Fix as Bindle Jackson
- Abner Biberman as Japanese captain at schoolhouse
- Vladimir Sokoloff as Señor Buenaventura J. Bello

As the film opens, the credits roll over actual film clips from January 30, 1945, of POWs being freed from Cabanatuan, a Japanese prisoner of war camp.

== Production ==
Producer and future production partner of John Wayne Robert Fellows had previously made two war films with fictional characters based on true incidents in the War in the Pacific: Bombardier, based on the Doolittle Raid, and Marine Raiders. He also produced the John Wayne western Tall in the Saddle for RKO. Fellows strongly believed that an account of the initial defeat and guerilla resistance of the American and Filipino forces, as well as MacArthur's return, would be a splendid tribute and a profitable film. Fellows contacted the Office of War Information, and the American military also agreed and provided their assistance.

The film took 130 days to shoot because of the rapidly changing Pacific war news of the time. Two thirds of the way through filming, the invasion of the Philippines occurred, forcing several script changes and rewrites in order to keep up with current events. The Raid at Cabanatuan and release of American prisoners was also rapidly incorporated into the screenplay, with scenes recreating the 6th Ranger Battalion attacking the Japanese prison camp. This action sequence is placed at the beginning of the film, while there are appearances by actual, recently released, American POWs inserted for dramatic effect at the end.

Ben Barzman's screenplay emphasized Filipino nationalism as much as American patriotism. A Filipino school principal, who reminds a Filipino schoolboy of Philippine nationalism, is later ordered by the Japanese conquerors to take down the American flag in the schoolyard. When he refuses to do so, the Japanese hang him from the same flagpole, his body draped by the stars and stripes.

During the action sequences, the soundtrack reuses large sections of Max Steiner's classic film score for RKO's King Kong (1933). In another small section of the score an instrumental fragment of My Country, 'Tis of Thee (to the tune of British national anthem) is also used.

Back to Bataan was Wayne's first encounter during the filming with Americans with open Communist sympathies and beliefs. Barzman and director Edward Dmyrtyk were outspoken about their communist views. When Wayne heard that Barzman and Dmytryk were openly belittling the religion of the film's technical advisor, Colonel George S. Clarke (who had commanded the 57th Infantry Regiment of the Philippine Scouts during the Battle of Bataan and was roughly Wayne's real life counterpart), and mocking him with renditions of the Internationale, he confronted Dmytryk, asking him if he was a communist. Dmytryk replied that he was not, but if "the masses of the American people wanted communism, it would be good for our country". Though Dmyrtyk denied he was a communist, Wayne felt that he was by his use of the word "masses". By contrast, Barzman's wife Norma recalled Wayne being friendly with her husband, with Wayne hugging him and calling him a "goddammned communist", to which Barzman jokingly replied that Wayne was a "fascist". Wayne also developed a friendly relationship with Dmytryk, respecting his talents as a director. The actor was genuinely perplexed as to why Dmytryk, who was well-paid and enjoying the fruits of American democracy, would have such sympathy for communism, asking him, "Jeez Eddie, what's your beef with America?"

During filming, Dmytryk and Barzman found out that Wayne had refused to use a stunt double. So they collaborated in writing scenes that they thought would force Wayne to insist on using a stunt double. Wayne was required in one scene to be lifted into the air by a leather harness, simulating being blown up by an explosion. In another, Wayne and Quinn had to enter an icy pond and remain underwater for a lengthy time, each breathing through a reed. Wayne did the stunts, but as he drank a bracing whiskey beforehand, he told Barzman, "You better be goddamn sure we don't find out this is something you dreamed up out of your little head as a parting gift".

In her book The Star-Entangled Banner, author Sharon Delmendo views Back to Bataan as Wayne acting as a stand-in for General Douglas MacArthur. He has to face the wrath of his Filipino officers asking him "where are the American forces?" He is later ordered to leave the Philippines only to return, like MacArthur, when the invasion finally happens.

== Reception ==
Rotten Tomatoes gives Back to Bataan a rating of 86% from 42 reviews.

== In popular culture ==
The film is referred to by characters in Martin Scorsese's Mean Streets.

== See also ==
- Bataan - a 1943 film about a small rearguard defending a bridge against the Japanese, starring Robert Taylor and Lloyd Nolan.
