= George S. Clarke =

United States Army officer (1890–1968)

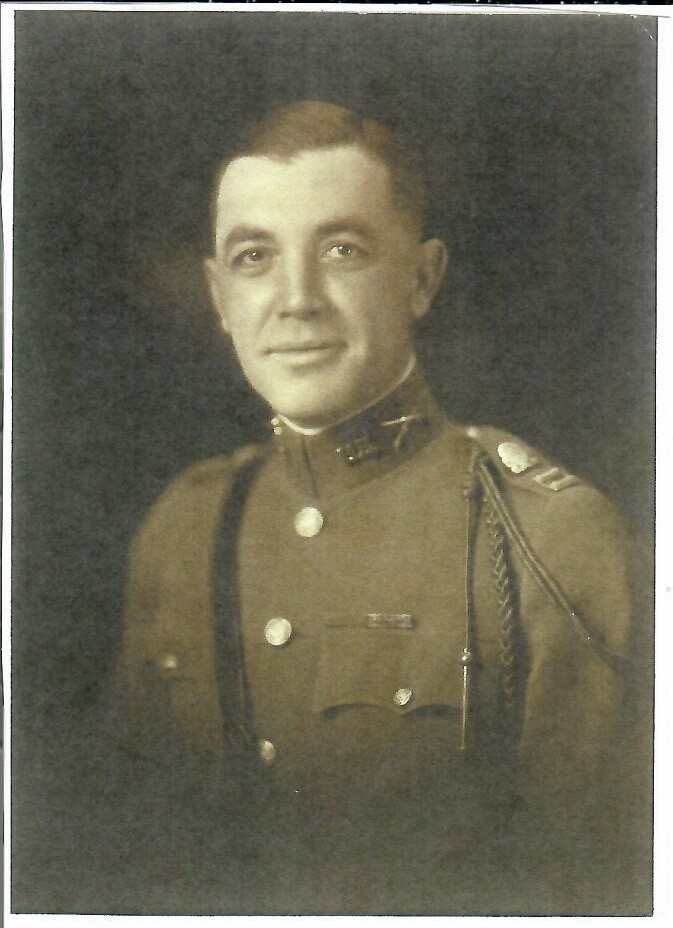
- George S. Clarke, circa 1910s
- Born: July 12, 1890; Spokane, Washington
- Died: May 25, 1968 (aged 77); Spokane, Washington
- Burial place: Greenwood Cemetery
- Military career
- Allegiance: United States
- Branch: United States Army
- Service years: 1912–1946
- Rank: Colonel
- Commands: 57th Infantry Regiment
- Conflicts: Pancho Villa Expedition; World War I World War II; Philippine–American War
- Awards: Bronze Star

George S. Clarke (July 12, 1890 – May 25, 1968) was a colonel in the United States Army. He commanded the 57th Infantry Regiment during the Battle of Bataan and the Japanese invasion of the Philippines during World War II.

== Biography ==
Colonel George S. Clarke was born and raised in Spokane, graduated from the New York Military Academy in 1909, and was commissioned as a 2nd Lieutenant in the Philippine Constabulary in 1912. He rose to major during World War I. He was promoted to lieutenant colonel in 1940 and to colonel in 1941. Clarke holds the distinction as the last US Army combat officer to leave the Philippines before their occupation by Japan on May 8, 1942, and the first to reach the United States.

=== Philippine-American War and the Pancho Villa Expedition ===
Colonel Clarke's first assignments included various commands in the Philippines, including service in the First Company, General Service Battalion, in Manila. During this time, Clarke fought Moro rebels on Jolo. Among several unconventional assignments, Clarke was directed to accompany the Sultan of Sulu on a pilgrimage to Mecca. By December 29, 1916, Clarke was reassigned to the newly established 37th U.S. Infantry along the U.S.-Mexico border, where he participated in anti-bandit operations.

=== World War I ===
Colonel Clarke served in France and Germany under the 18th Infantry Regiment, 1st Infantry Division for the last two years of World War I. He fought in 5 major engagements of The Great War: the Battle of Saint-Mihiel, the Second Battle of the Marne, the Third Battle of the Aisne, the Meuse–Argonne offensive, and in the Battle of Cantigny, the first clash between the U.S. Army and the German Army of the conflict.

=== Inter-War Years ===
Colonel Clarke administered numerous Civilian Conservation Corps (CCC) projects, and by 1939 was assigned as the District Commander of a CCC camp in Sparta, Wisconsin. Clarke energetically engaged in CCC work - unlike many regular Army officers at the time - and noted with pride in his autobiography that he improved the performances of many of his CCC companies from "unsatisfactory" to "satisfactory," "superior," or "very, very excellent."

=== World War II ===
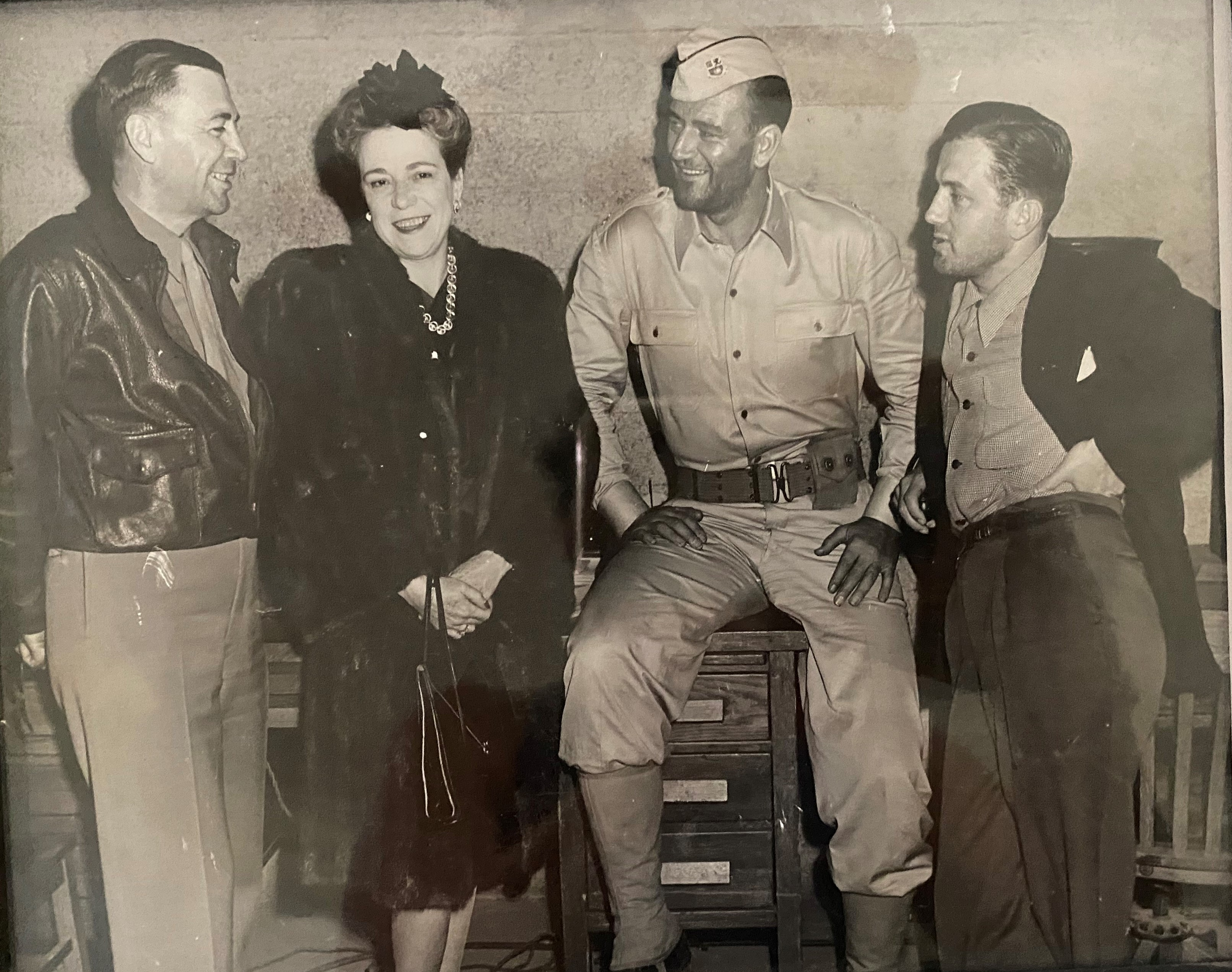
Colonel George S. Clarke, John Wayne, and director Edward Dmytryk, circa 1940s

Shortly before the Japanese invasion of the Philippines, Colonel Clarke assumed command of the 57th Infantry Regiment of the Philippine Scouts. Under his leadership, the 57th Infantry Regiment repulsed the first 11 attempts by 20 Japanese regiments to breach the Abucay Line, a defensive line protecting the Bataan Peninsula, the island fortress of Corregidor, and other valuable U.S. assets in the Philippines.

Colonel Clarke left the Philippines under orders from Lieutenant General Jonathan M. Wainwright, a mere five hours before U.S. forces surrendered on the Bataan Peninsula. He is regarded as the last US Army combat officer to leave the Philippines before their conquest by Japan on May 8, 1942.

Upon his return to the United States the War Department assigned Colonel Clarke to numerous roles, including a role as a technical advisor to the 1945 film Back to Bataan. Actor John Wayne portrayed Clarke in the film.

=== Death and Character ===
Colonel Clarke retired from the Army in 1946. He returned to Spokane and died there in 1968. He is interred at Greenwood Cemetery.

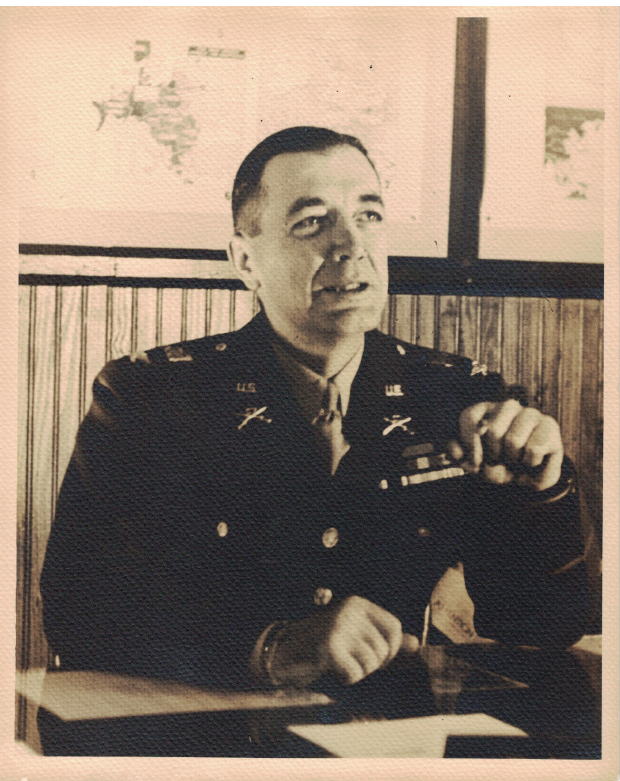
Colonel George S. Clarke, circa 1940s

Colonel Clarke developed a reputation for courage, toughness, and integrity throughout his military career. Filipino diplomat and soldier Carlos P. Romulo noted Clarke's tendency to fight alongside his men during the 1941-1942 Philippine Campaign. On one occasion Romulo observed Clarke - who had been rendered unconscious from a Japanese bomb blast - "deliriously calling out names of dead soldiers whom he commanded" while recovering in a nearby hospital.

While recovering from starvation and disease following his escape from the Philippines, Clarke personally wrote or dictated hundreds of letters to those whose loved ones had been captured on the Philippines by Japanese forces. These letters provided numerous parents and spouses with more accurate and recent information regarding their loved ones' conditions than the War Department could provide.

U.S. newspapers documented Colonel Clarke's support to military personnel with whom he had served on the Philippines. In an effort to fulfil the final orders that he received from General Jonathan M. Wainwright to "get out and get some food for those starving men" defending Bataan and Corregidor, Clarke organized Red Cross shipments of food and comfort materiel to the U.S. prisoners captured after the fall of the Philippines.

The U.S. War Department appointed Colonel Clarke as a technical advisor on several Hollywood film productions upon his return to the United States. In that capacity Colonel Clarke criticized the American film industry for inaccurately portraying the sacrifices made by U.S. military personnel during the Japanese invasion of the Philippines. Colonel Clarke criticized the portrayal of Army nurses as nervous and quarrelsome in the 1943 play turned film Cry 'Havoc' (film), requesting that they be portrayed accurately:

I left Bataan five minutes before its capitulation... and during its entire terrible struggle I saw these wonderful women serve their country with heroism and fidelity. They were truly angels of mercy - dirty, under-fed, overworked, but always cheerful. They deserve individual medals for their heroism and devotion to duty, rather than be depicted as they were in the play.

=== Responses to Clarke's Account of Bataan ===
Upon his return to the United States in 1942, Colonel Clarke publicly stated that the American government and people had forgotten about the 27,000 American soldiers defeated and imprisoned on the Philippines. He believed that many U.S. politicians and warfighters had acted unethically by prioritizing the European Theater over the War in the Pacific. For this President Roosevelt accused Clarke of undermining the war effort, stripped him of his temporary promotion to brigadier general, and ignored his insight into how the Japanese waged war by assigning him to various noncombat roles.

While unpopular with most interpretations of the U.S. wartime strategy during World War II, Clarke's sentiment was later recorded, expanded, and analyzed by then Major Matthew Klimow. In a 1990 article, Major Klimow wrote that the lies and half-truths issued by Secretary of War Henry Stimson, Army Chief of Staff George C. Marshall, and President Franklin D. Roosevelt regarding the prioritization of the Philippines' defense "was an unconscionable breach of faith that only deepened the final disillusionment of gallant fighters essentially abandoned by the United States."
