= Willibald C. Bianchi =

United States Army Medal of Honor recipient (1915–1945)

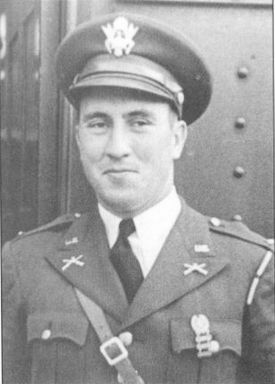
- Born: March 12, 1915; New Ulm, Minnesota
- Died: January 9, 1945 (aged 29); Takao, Formosa
- Military career
- Allegiance: United States of America
- Branch: United States Army
- Service years: 1940–1945
- Rank: Captain
- Service number: O-389009
- Units: 45th Infantry Regiment, Philippine Scouts
- Conflicts: World War II: Philippines campaign; Battle of Bataan; Bataan Death March
- Awards: Medal of Honor; Bronze Star; Purple Heart with 3 Oak Leaf Clusters

Willibald Charles Bianchi (March 12, 1915 – January 9, 1945) was a United States Army officer serving with the Philippine Scouts who received the Medal of Honor during World War II for his actions near Bagac, Philippines, during the Battle of Bataan in 1942. Bianchi is one of three members of the Philippine Scouts who were awarded the Medal of Honor. Bianchi was later among the troops captured by the Japanese at the fall of Bataan, on April 9, 1942. He was killed in action in January 1945, but his remains were unable to be positively identified until 2025.

== Early life and military career ==
Bianchi graduated from the South Dakota State College of Agriculture and Mechanic Arts in 1940 and was commissioned a second lieutenant of infantry in the Organized Reserve through the school's Reserve Officers' Training Corps program. After being called to active duty in the spring of 1941, Bianchi requested an assignment to the Philippines.

== Medal of Honor citation ==
Bianchi, Willibald C.
Rank and organization: First Lieutenant, U.S. Army, 45th Infantry, Philippine Scouts
Place and date: Near Bagac, Bataan Province, Philippine Islands, February 3, 1942
Entered service at: New Ulm, Minnesota
Born: New Ulm, Minnesota
Citation:

For conspicuous gallantry and intrepidity above and beyond the call of duty in action with the enemy on 3 February 1942, near Bagac, Province of Bataan, Philippine Islands. When the rifle platoon of another company was ordered to wipe out 2 strong enemy machinegun nests, 1st Lt. Bianchi voluntarily and of his own initiative, advanced with the platoon leading part of the men. When wounded early in the action by 2 bullets through the left hand, he did not stop for first aid but discarded his rifle and began firing a pistol. He located a machinegun nest and personally silenced it with grenades. When wounded the second time by 2 machinegun bullets through the chest muscles, 1st Lt. Bianchi climbed to the top of an American tank, manned its antiaircraft machinegun, and fired into strongly held enemy position until knocked completely off the tank by a third severe wound.

== Prisoner of war and death ==
After recovering from his wounds, Bianchi returned to action and was subsequently captured by the Japanese after the fall of the Philippines. He was part of the Bataan "Death March," and was imprisoned in several Japanese prisoner of war camps, enduring horrible conditions. He was known for his compassion and efforts to better the lot of his fellow prisoners by bartering with their captors for extra food and medicine. He was promoted to captain in absentia.

Bianchi survived the sinking of the unmarked Japanese "hell ship" Ōryoku Maru on December 15, 1944. Along with some of the other surviving prisoners, he was transferred to the Enoura Maru, which set sail for Formosa. On January 9, 1945, while the Enoura Maru was docked at the port of Takao, Bianchi and several hundred other Allied prisoners were killed instantly when an American plane, unaware that the ship contained friendly prisoners, dropped a 1,000-pound bomb in the cargo hold. Bianchi's remains, along with those of 430 other Americans who were unable to be identified, were buried as "unknowns" at the National Memorial Cemetery of the Pacific in Honolulu, Hawaii. Bianchi's remains were positively identified through DNA analysis in August 2025, and he will be interred at the New Ulm Cemetery in his hometown of New Ulm, Minnesota.

== Honors ==
A monument was erected at South Dakota State University honoring Bianchi and fellow alumnus and Medal of Honor recipient Leo K. Thorsness.

== See also ==
- List of Medal of Honor recipients for World War II
- List of Italian American Medal of Honor recipients
