= Benigno G. Tabora =

United States Army officer (1915–2008)

- Benigno talking to fourth-graders about his experiences in 2004
- Born: November 22, 1915; Lingayen, Philippine Islands
- Died: February 17, 2008 (aged 92); Acton, Massachusetts, U.S.
- Military career
- Allegiance: United States of America
- Branch: United States Army
- Service years: 1931–1968
- Rank: Sergeant Major
- Unit: Philippine Scouts
- Conflicts: World War II: Battle of the Philippines (1941–1942); Battle of Bataan; Korean War: Battle of Inchon
- Awards: Purple Heart

Benigno de Guzman Tabora (November 20, 1915 – February 17, 2008) was a Filipino American veteran of both World War II and the Korean War. Tabora was one of the last of an increasingly dwindling group of veterans who survived the Bataan Death March in May 1942 after the Japanese captured the Philippines during World War II. He spent eight months as a prisoner of war in a Japanese internment camp. Tabora served in the military intelligence during his 31 years in the Army.

== Early life ==
Tabora was born in Lingayen in the Philippines on November 20, 1915, to parents Benigno and Felipa (de Guzman) Tabora. He joined the United States Army when he was 21 years old and served in the 45th Infantry Regiment of the Philippine Scouts, rising to corporal by the time of the Japanese invasion of the Philippines.

== World War II ==
Tabora and thousands of other American servicemen were captured by the Japanese following the outbreak World War II and the occupation of the Philippines. He survived the infamous Bataan Death March in April 1942, in which hundreds of other prisoners died. For the following eight months, Tabora was held as a POW at the Camp O'Donnell internment camp at the end of the Bataan Death March. Tabora was starved and tortured by the Japanese soldiers who guarded the POW camp. He was also stabbed with a bayonet and beaten with rifle butts when nine of his men escaped the camp. Japanese soldiers also held Tabora's head in water as a form of torture.

The abuse and torture took its toll. At the worst point in the camp, Tabora weighed less than ninety pounds and lost nearly all his hair. Tabora later wrote of his experience in the camp, "I planned to escape several times, but my physical condition prevented me from doing so."

Tabora's brother, as well as his commanders and many of his men from his regiment, died as a result of the Baatan Death March and the maltreatment in the POW camp.

Tabora managed to make his way out of the camp. He was later commissioned as a United States Army officer for fighting the Japanese behind enemy lines. Tabora was later promoted to captain by the time he left the army after the war.

== Korean War ==
Tabora re-enlisted in the army at the start of the Korean War. However, after the torture he experienced during World War II as a POW, he promised himself that he would never be taken prisoner again. When Tabora's unit landed in Inchon, Korea, he reportedly saved one bullet, intending to take his own life if he was captured in combat. Fortunately there were no U.S. casualties during the Inchon landing and Tabora was never captured.

== Late life ==
Tabora remained in the Army following the Korean War. He retired from active duty in 1968 with the rank of sergeant major. Tabora spent a total of 31 years in the Army.

Tabora took a position with the Cutler Hospital in Fort Devens. He moved to Leominster, Massachusetts, and remained a resident of the area for over forty years.

Massachusetts veterans groups tried in vain to have Tabora awarded the Purple Heart for the injuries he sustained as a POW. However their requests were turned down. Tabora, himself, never asked for the award. He remained active in veterans organizations such as the Veterans of Foreign Wars and the Disabled American Veterans.

== Death ==
Benigno Tabora died of an illness at the Life Care Center of Acton in Acton, Massachusetts, on February 17, 2008. He was survived by his wife, Mae T. (Fontaine) Tabora. The couple had been married for 32 years. His first wife, Emelia Caranto, died in 1974. Tabora was also survived by four children—Cara, Merlene, Elden and Napoleon—and two stepdaughters, Gail and Linda.
