= Fely =

Fely is a name. Notable people with the name include:

- Fely Crisóstomo, Filipina film director and actress
- Fely Franquelli (1916–2002), Filipino dancer, choreographer, and actress
- Fely Irvine (born 1989), Australian actress, singer and dancer
- Pépé Fely, pseudonym of Félix Manuaku Waku (born 1954), a Congolese Rumba guitarist, songwriter, producer, arranger, and lyricist
- Pierre Fely, pseudonym of Pascal Pia (1903–1979), a French writer, journalist, illustrator and scholar
