= Vicente Barros =

Filipino U.S. Army officer (1887–1966)

U.S. Army Major Vicente Barros
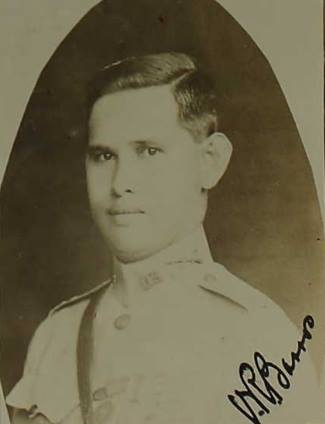
- Born: July 27, 1887; Lopez, Quezon, Captaincy General of the Philippines
- Died: May 22, 1966 (aged 78)
- Resting place: Libingan ng mga Bayani
- Education: Philippine Normal School; Philippine Law School; Garrison School of the U.S. Army
- Spouse: Victoria Jariol Barros
- Children: 2
- Relatives: Salvador Barros (brother)
- Military career
- Allegiance: Philippines; United States
- Branch of Service: Philippine Constabulary; Philippine Scouts (US Army); Philippine National Guard
- Service years: 1907 – 1922
- Rank: Major, U.S. Army; Lieutenant colonel, Philippine National Guard
- Units: 23rd Infantry Regiment, Philippine Scouts, US Army; 1st Division, Philippine National Guard
- Battles/Wars: Moro Rebellion; World War I
- Awards: Philippine Campaign Medal; Victory Medal; Silver Star Medal

Vicente Rico Barros (July 27, 1887 – May 2, 1966) was a Filipino U.S. Army major who played a major role in the formation of the first federalized army of the Philippines at the end of World War I (1917–18). Barros was formerly an officer of the Philippine Scouts (a defunct division of the U.S. Army). He was a decorated soldier and a veteran of the Philippine Constabulary (1907–1911) during the Moro Rebellion before being absorbed by the U.S. Army's Philippine Division. Former Governor General of the Philippines Francis B. Harrison cited Barros for his role in a brief history of the Philippine National Guard, "The Division was commanded by Brigadier-General F.R. Day, U.S.A.; all officers above the grade of Major, by insistence of the army, were Americans, except Lieutenant-Colonel Vicente R. Barros, a West Point graduate."

== Early life and education ==
Vicente Barros was born on July 27, 1887 in the town of Lopez, Quezon province (formerly Tayabas province). He is the son in a brood of ten of Don Pedro Jose Moran Barros and Honorata Rico of Arayat, Pampanga. Pedro Barros owned a large coconut plantation in Lopez and because of his political influence and official capacity, he was able to change the name of sitio Tinalpok to Concepcion in honor of his beautiful daughter. Vicente's father Pedro was also the Deputy Municipal Treasurer of the province of Tayabas and a judge. Vicente has a brother of prominence in Philippine literature, Salvador Barros, a writer and poet who died of dysentery and tuberculosis in 1940.

Barros got his degree in education from Philippine Normal School in 1906. He was a teacher for a year at Philippine Normal School before joining the military.

== Military career ==
Barros started his military career with the Philippine Constabulary in 1907 as a commissioned officer (Second-Lieutenant). He was later assigned to command a company in Mindanao and saw action in the Moro Rebellion. The war took a heavy toll with more than a thousand casualties on the side of the government's two forces, the Philippine Constabulary and the Philippine Scouts. His heroics in the battle earned him merits and medals, having injured from the fight. He survived the massacre of the Moros in 1911.

In 1912 First-Lieutenant Barros was accepted in the U.S. Army as a Second-Lieutenant of the Philippine Scouts.

== Published works ==
Barros has published a number of books, including amendments to the Civil Service Code and a number of Philippine Laws and Regulations, after retiring from military career.

- Social and Political Thoughts and Other Writings (1961)
- War Maxims of Great Generals (1934)
