= 43rd Infantry Regiment (United States) =

43d Infantry Regiment
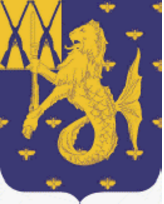
- Coat of arms
- Active: 1917–1946
- Country: United States
- Branch: United States Army
- Type: Infantry
- Part of: US Philippine Division
- Garrison/HQ: Camp Holmes, Pettit Barracks
- Engagements: World War II

Commanders
- Notable commanders: John Horan William F. Dalton John McGee

The 43rd Philippine Scout Infantry Regiment (43rd INF (PS)) was part of USAFFE's Philippine Division, during World War II.

== History ==
The 43d Infantry Regiment was formed in June 1917, at Fort Douglas, Utah. In April 1921, it became a Philippine Scout unit and joined the Philippine Division, on 22 October. In 1922, the unit was deactivated.

The 1st Battalion was reactivated on 1 April 1941, formed from troops transferred from the 45th Infantry Regiment (PS), and the 329 troops of the 1st Battalion served at Pettit Barracks and Camp John Hay. The 1st Battalion surrendered to the Japanese on 9 April 1942. However, elements of Troop C, 26th Cavalry, and Companies C and E, 43d Infantry, all isolated in Northern Luzon, became the core of guerrilla units which continued to resist until the end of the war.

Another account, from Louis Morton's "The Fall of the Philippines", place C and E companies on Mindanao where they staffed an infantry school and trained elements of the Philippine Army. These instructors were organized into a reserve force for Colonel William P. Morse's 102nd Division (PA). They continue to serve in this role during the final defense of Mindanao town of Dalirig in the Cagayan Sector.

These companies, led by Major Allen Peck, "made a brave stand" in Dalirig on 9 May 1942 to cover the withdrawal of the Philippine Army 62d Infantry Regiment during their retreat from defenses near the Del Monte airfield. The Scouts stood their ground until they were surrounded on three sides by Japanese troops from the Kawamura Detachment. At that point they fell back before they were completely cut off by pursuing Japanese forces. These units were probably dispersed with the rest of the Dalirig force and were surrendered with the rest of General Sharp's command on 10 May.

The unit was reorganized following the war but disbanded a year later.

== See also ==
- Military History of the Philippines
- Military History of the United States
