= 39th Field Artillery Regiment =

US military unit

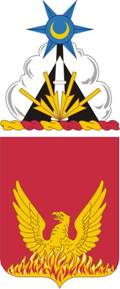
- Coat of arms
- Active: 1918
- Country: United States
- Branch: Army
- Type: Field artillery
- Motto(s): Celerita In Conficiendo (Speed in Action)

Insignia
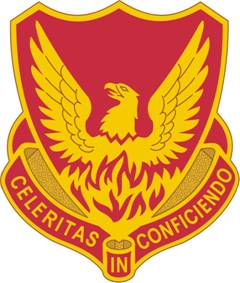
- Distinctive unit insignia

The 39th Field Artillery Regiment is a field artillery regiment of the United States Army.

== Lineage ==
Constituted in the National Army as the 39th Field Artillery and assigned to the 13th Division, 5 July 1918.

== Distinctive unit insignia ==
- Description

A Gold color metal and enamel device 1 1/8 inches (2.9 cm) in height overall consisting of a shield blazoned: Gules, issuing from base a phoenix Or rising from flames Proper. Attached below the shield a Red scroll inscribed "CELERITAS IN CONFICIENDO" in Gold letters.

- Symbolism

The shield is red for Artillery. The fabulous bird, the phoenix, symbolizes the reactivation and restoration of the organization.

- Background

The distinctive unit insignia was originally approved for the 39th Field Artillery Battalion on 25 February 1941. It was redesignated for the 39th Artillery Regiment on 26 November 1958. The insignia was redesignated for the 39th Field Artillery Regiment on 1 September 1971.

== Coat of arms ==
- Blazon
- Shield

Gules, issuing from base a phoenix Or rising from flames Proper.

- Crest

On a wreath of the colors Or and Gules, in front of a cloud Argent an isosceles triangle Sable and a war mace palewise the staff counterchanged and the head with six spikes Azure charged with a crescent of the first all surmounted in base by four arrowheads in pile conjoined at the point Gold. Motto CELERITA IN CONFICIENDO (Speed in Action).

  - Symbolism
- Shield

The shield is red for Artillery. The fabulous bird, the phoenix, symbolizes the reactivation and restoration of the organization.

- Crest

The war mace, from the arms of Colmar in Northern France, commemorates the organization's most distinguished war service. The head of the mace is blue in reference to the color of the Distinguished Unit Citation streamer awarded for that action. The six spikes of the mace stand for the organization's six unit decorations. The crescent alludes to the location of the unit's first service under fire – Algeria-French Morocco. The four arrowheads are for four assault landings. The cloud and the radiating arrowheads simulate a burst of artillery fire. The black triangle represents the armament area in North Korea known as the "Iron Triangle" during the Korean War. It commemorates the organization's action in that locality.

- Background

The coat of arms was originally approved for the 39th Field Artillery Battalion on 25 February 1941. It was redesignated for the 39th Artillery Regiment on 26 November 1958. It was amended to add a crest on 23 June 1965. The insignia was redesignated for the 39th Field Artillery Regiment on 1 September 1971.

== Current configuration ==
- 1st Battalion 39th Field Artillery Regiment (United States)
- 2nd Battalion 39th Field Artillery Regiment (United States)
- 3rd Battalion 39th Field Artillery Regiment (United States)
- 4th Battalion 39th Field Artillery Regiment (United States)
- 5th Battalion 39th Field Artillery Regiment (United States)
- 6th Battalion 39th Field Artillery Regiment (United States)

== See also ==
- Field Artillery Branch (United States)
