= 13th Division (United States) =

Former US Army unit

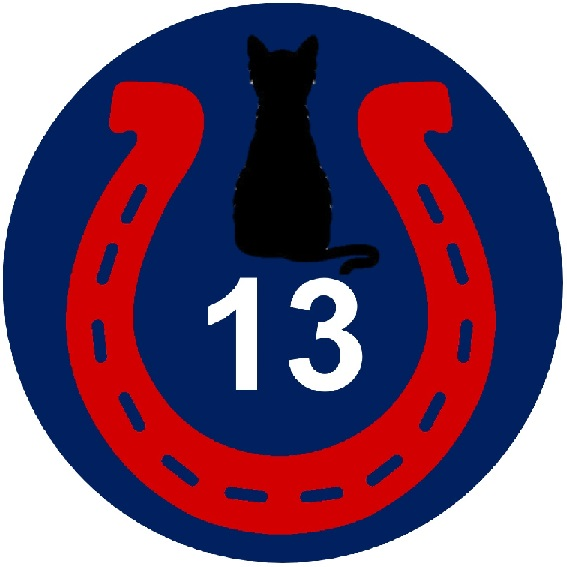
- Active: July 1918 - April 1919
- Country: United States
- Branch: United States Army
- Role: Infantry
- Size: Division
- Garrison/HQ: Camp Lewis, Washington
- Nickname: Black Cats

Commanders
- Notable commanders: Brigadier General Cornelius Vanderbilt III (Interim) Brigadier General Frank B. Watson (Interim) Major General Joseph D. Leitch

The 13th Division was an infantry division of the United States Army. It was established at Camp Lewis, Washington, in 1918, during World War I. The war ended before the division saw combat, and it was inactivated in 1919.

== History ==
=== World War I ===
==== Formation ====
The 13th Division was activated at Camp Lewis, Washington on 16 July 1918 as part of the U.S. military mobilization for World War I. It was manned and trained at Camp Lewis in preparation for combat in France, Several existing Regular Army units, and cadres taken from these units, formed the division's nucleus, while draftees, predominantly from California, Montana, Oregon, Washington, Colorado, North Dakota, and Utah, filled out the rest of the division.

The "square" 13th Division's complement of four regiments included the 1st, 44th, 75th, and 76th Infantry Regiments. In August 1918, the regiments were organized to form two brigades—the 25th (1st and 75th Regiments, plus the 38th Machine Gun Battalion) -- and the 26th Brigade (44th and 76th Regiments, plus the 39th Machine Gun Battalion).

==== Organization ====
- 13th Division Headquarters Troop
  - 37th Division Machine Gun Bn
  - 25th Infantry Brigade
    - 1st Infantry Regiment
    - 75th Infantry Regiment (organized around cadre from 1st Infantry)
    - 38th Machine Gun Bn
  - 26th Infantry Brigade
    - 44th Infantry Regiment (organized around cadre from 14th Infantry)
    - 76th Infantry Regiment (organized around cadre from 44th Infantry)
    - 39th Machine Gun Bn
  - 13th Field Artillery Brigade
    - 37th Field Artillery Regiment
    - 38th Field Artillery Regiment
    - 39th Field Artillery Regiment
    - 13th Trench Mortar Battery
  - 213th Engineer Regiment
  - 213th Field Signal Battalion
  - 13th Train Headquarters and Military Police
  - 13th Supply Train
  - 213th Engineer Train
  - 13th Ammunition Train
  - 13th Sanitary Train
    - 249th-252nd Field Hospitals and Ambulance Companies

==== Community support ====
Cornelius Vanderbilt III served as the division's interim commander in the summer of 1918. As they had for the recently departed 91st Division, community leaders welcomed Vanderbilt at a formal reception which took place at the newly-constructed Camp Lewis gymnasium, and included an orchestra, and more than 1,000 guests, including Governor Ernest Lister. In addition to the reception for Vanderbilt, the civilian community welcomed the 13th Division's soldiers with public events, including a picnic and a track meet.

Horace R. Cayton Sr., the publisher of Cayton's Weekly and Seattle's first African American journalist, criticized Vanderbilt for barring black troops from Camp Lewis's most popular recreation center. He had also segregated the camp's Young Women's Christian Association (YWCA) Hostess House, which was widely popular among soldiers. Vanderbilt lifted the bans in September as the result of the public outcry generated by Cayton's articles.

==== Service at Camp Lewis ====
The 13th Division was briefly commanded by Brigadier General Frank B. Watson, with Vanderbilt taking command of the 25th Brigade. When the permanent commander, Major General Joseph D. Leitch arrived in October 1918, Watson assumed command of the 26th Brigade.

In late September 1918, the Spanish influenza epidemic reached Camp Lewis, and the post soon averaged 10 deaths per week. In early October, the 213th Engineer Regiment arrived for assignment to the 13th Division, and brought even more ill soldiers into the camp. In an effort to halt the widening epidemic, Leitch imposed a quarantine on 19 October.

A Tacoma Daily Ledger fundraising campaign to erect the world's largest flagpole at Camp Lewis culminated on 12 October 1918, when soldiers attempted to raise a 60-by-90-foot American flag which was mounted on a 314-foot-tall pole made from a Douglas fir tree. The event was sparsely attended because of the flu quarantine, and soon after the pole went up, a gust of wind whipped the flag hard enough to snap the pole in three places. An attempt to raise a 214-foot pole in November also met with failure, as the wind caught the flag during the dedication ceremony, snapped the pole into two pieces and shredded the flag. A third, more traditional flagpole was successfully erected later in November.

==== Death of Alexander P. Cronkhite ====
Major Alexander P. Cronkhite was a company commander in the 213th Engineers and the son of Major General Adelbert Cronkhite. He arrived at Camp Lewis in early October, and was soon hospitalized with influenza. Major Cronkhite was released on 21 October, and joined his company for a cross-country hike. Because he was still recovering, another officer was temporarily in command. When the group stopped to rest and eat lunch, Cronkhite used a borrowed handgun to engage in target practice by shooting at a tobacco tin on a nearby fence post. While engaged in this activity, Cronkhite sustained a gunshot wound and died at the scene. Subsequent investigation found that it was accidental and self-inflicted.

Adelbert Cronkhite did not accept this finding, and pushed for several years to have the investigation reopened. In the mid-1920s, the sergeant and captain who had been with Alexander Cronkhite when he died were arrested and charged with murder. Because the captain was Jewish, Adelbert Cronkhite's cause was taken up by antisemitic newspapers, creating a nationwide story. When the sergeant was tried, defense attorneys were able to demonstrate that an accidental shooting was the most likely possibility. He was acquitted, and charges against the captain were soon dismissed.

=== Post-war ===
The armistice of 11 November 1918 ended World War I before the 13th Division could complete its training and depart for France. Within a few days, Leitch began permitting the release of officers who were no longer needed, as well as soldiers who requested discharge so they could return home to support their families. The 13th Division held a demobilization parade on 22 November 1918, with members of the local community watching primarily from their automobiles as a precaution against the spread of influenza.

The division was nearly demobilized by February 1919, except for the 13th Field Artillery Brigade, which was briefly employed in Seattle to help restore order during a labor strike. Demobilization resumed again on 25 February, and the soldiers of the 13th Field Artillery Brigade were soon discharged to civilian life.

== Insignia ==
The 13th Division's shoulder sleeve insignia was approved by the War Department shortly before the division demobilized. It consisted of a blue circle featuring the number 13 in white. A black cat depicted above a red horseshoe open at the top were intended to represent hoodoo that the Germans could not defeat, and the good luck that the division expected to have during combat in France.

== Commanders ==
=== Division commanders ===
- Colonel Edward N. Jones Jr. (Interim), 17 July 1918
- Brigadier General Cornelius Vanderbilt III (Interim), 20 August 1918
- Brigadier General Frank B. Watson (Interim), 11 September 1918
- Major General Joseph D. Leitch, 7 October 1918

=== Brigade commanders ===
- Brigadier General Cornelius Vanderbilt III, 25th Infantry Brigade
- Brigadier General Frank B. Watson, 26th Infantry Brigade
- Brigadier General William P. Ennis, 13th Field Artillery Brigade

== See also ==
- World War II unit named 13th Airborne Division
