= Philippine Scout mutiny =

July 1924 mutiny

The Philippine Scout mutiny was a mutiny by the Philippine Scouts of the Philippine Division which occurred in July 1924.

The Philippine Scouts were raised by the U.S. Army during the Philippine-American War (1899–1902). They served as auxiliaries to the United States units and assisted in various duties such as navigation and combat. In the early 1920s, these scouts began to function as American units. They made up the core of U.S. military rule in the Philippines. However, they were not given the same benefits as their white counterparts. With growing discontent, a mutiny was staged on July 7, 1924, at Fort William McKinley, but was quickly quelled.

Many of the scouts who staged the mutiny were sentenced to lengthy prison terms. The U.S. Army made no changes in the Scouts' pay, recruitment policies or leadership promotions. The indifference of authorities in refusing to acknowledge the disparities would mirror the long struggle for equal benefits of Filipino-American veterans who fought for the United States during World War II.
