= Salvador Barros =

Filipino author and poet

- Born: February 21, 1910; Lopez, Tayabas, Philippine Islands
- Died: May 24, 1940 (aged 30)
- Education: Lopez Elementary School; Tayabas High School; University of Manila
- Occupations: Writer, poet
- Relatives: Vicente Barros (brother)
- Writing career
- Pen name: Rodavlas
- Language: Tagalog, Spanish, English
- Genres: Tagalog Modernism, Fiction
- Notable works: Paniningil ng Alila (The Servant Collects), 1935
- Literary movement: Kapisanang Panitikan (Tagalog Literature Guild), Sakdalista (Scandalist)

Salvador Rico Barros (February 21, 1910 – May 24, 1940) was a Filipino poet and fictionist. He used the pen name Rodavlas. Barros wrote about 50 poems and 40 short stories in his lifetime. He won a gold medal award for best author in 1937. He died in 1940.

== Published works ==
- (Ten Poems)
- Mga Tinig ng Puso (Sonnets, Voices from the Heart)
