= Jose Montalvan =

Filipino military officer, dentist and lawyer (1903–1978)

- Born: Jose Manuel Corrales Montalvan; March 17, 1903; Cagayan de Oro, Philippine Islands
- Died: September 11, 1978 (aged 75)
- Military career
- Allegiance: Philippines; United States
- Branch: Philippine Army; United States Army
- Rank: Major
- Unit: United States Army Forces in the Far East
- Conflicts: World War II

Jose Manuel Corrales Montalvan was a Filipino military officer, Dentist and Lawyer who fought in Mindanao during World War II.

== Early life ==
Montalvan was born on March 17, 1903, in present-day Cagayan de Oro. (then known as Cagayan de Misamis, the capital town of the Segundo Distrito de Misamis) to Jose Gabriel Montalvan y Bello, a Spaniard from Belmonte, Cuenca, Spain who was assigned by the Spanish government to the Philippines, and Concepcion Corrales y Roa of Cagayan de Misamis.

== Career ==
In 1927, Montalvan graduated with honors (3rd highest) from the Philippine Dental College, Manila with a degree of Doctor in Dental Surgery.

Upon his return to his hometown in 1928, he practiced dentistry and became one of the first teachers of the Ateneo de Cagayan (present day Xavier University) and was its Commandant of the Corps of Cadets.

Montalvan was part of the United States Army Reserve in 1928 as a commissioned first lieutenant and also underwent training with the U.S. Army Extension Courses. From 1933 to 1937, Montalvan taught at the Ateneo de Cagayan as an instructor in military science and tactics. He would resign from the U.S. Army Reserve to become a commissioned first lieutenant at the Philippine Army's Infantry Reserve on July 16, 1936. He would be called to active duty training at Camp Murphy Training School graduating in 1938.

He would be called to an extended tour of active duty. He was assigned as a cadre commander of the 2nd Misamis Oriental (Machine Gun) Cadre at Camp Bulua throughout 1939. He would become camp commander and mobilization officer in the same camp now renamed as Camp Edilberto Evangelista from January 1, 1940, until the onset of World War II. In 1940 he would graduate from the School of Military Law and Courts-Martial Procedures, Camp Keithley in Lanao.

Montalvan would become part of the United States Army Forces in the Far East (USAFFE) on September 6, 1941. He was appointed as division finance officer and division quartermaster of the USAFFE's 102nd Division.

=== World War II ===
During the Japanese occupation of the Philippines, Montalvan was captured by Imperial Japanese forces following the surrender of the USAFFE in Mindanao led by William F. Sharp. He was detained at the Ateneo de Cagayan campus. He escaped to join the guerilla movement led by American Wendell Fertig.

== Post–World War II and later life ==
Montalvan was placed in inactive status on July 11, 1946, due to polyneuritis. He was promoted to the rank of major under the infantry reserve on January 20, 1950.

He went back to his duties as an instructor in Spanish at the Ateneo in 1949. He entered Ateneo's Cagayan Law School to pursue a career in law. He obtained his bachelor's degree in law in 1953 and passed the bar examinations. He was admitted to the bar in June 1954 and became a practicing lawyer. Montalvan died on September 11, 1978.

== Legacy ==
In 2011, there was a proposal to rename Camp Evangelista after Montalvan in recognition of contribution to the Philippines' pushback against to the Japanese during the World War II. The proposal's proponents believe that it is apt to rename the camp in honor of someone who is also a native of Cagayan de Oro.

== Personal life ==
Montalvan was married to Mercedes Acero Roa with whom he had six children, Marietta, Daisy, Annabel, Eduardo, Consuelo & Antonio.

== Awards ==
Montalvan received the following honors and recognitions:

- Philippine Defense Medal
- American Defense Medal
- Asiatic–Pacific Campaign Medal
- World War II Victory Medal
- Philippine Republic Unit Citation Badge
- US Distinguished Unit Badge
