= Royal Reynolds Jr. =

United States Army general (1910 – 2003)

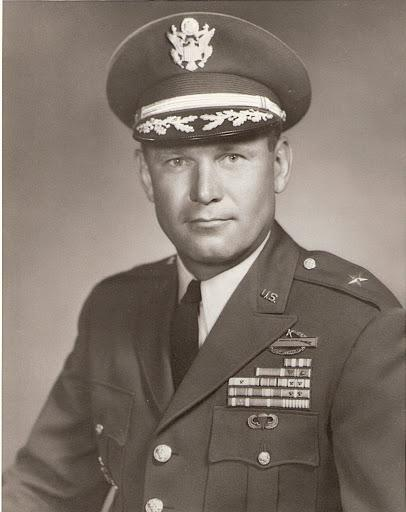
- Born: October 17, 1910; California, US
- Died: November 24, 2003 (aged 93); Arlington, Virginia, US
- Burial place: Arlington National Cemetery
- Relatives: BG Royal Reynolds, father MG Charles R. Reynolds, uncle
- Military career
- Allegiance: United States of America
- Branch: United States Army
- Service years: 1933–1963
- Rank: Brigadier General
- Conflicts: World War II; Korean War
- Awards: Silver Star; Legion of Merit (2); Bronze Star Medal (2)

Royal Reynolds Jr. (October 17, 1910 – November 24, 2003) was a decorated American brigadier general who served with an American-Filipino guerrilla force on the Japanese-occupied Philippines during World War II. His last assignment was as the Assistant Commander of the Infantry School at Fort Benning, Georgia.

== Biography ==
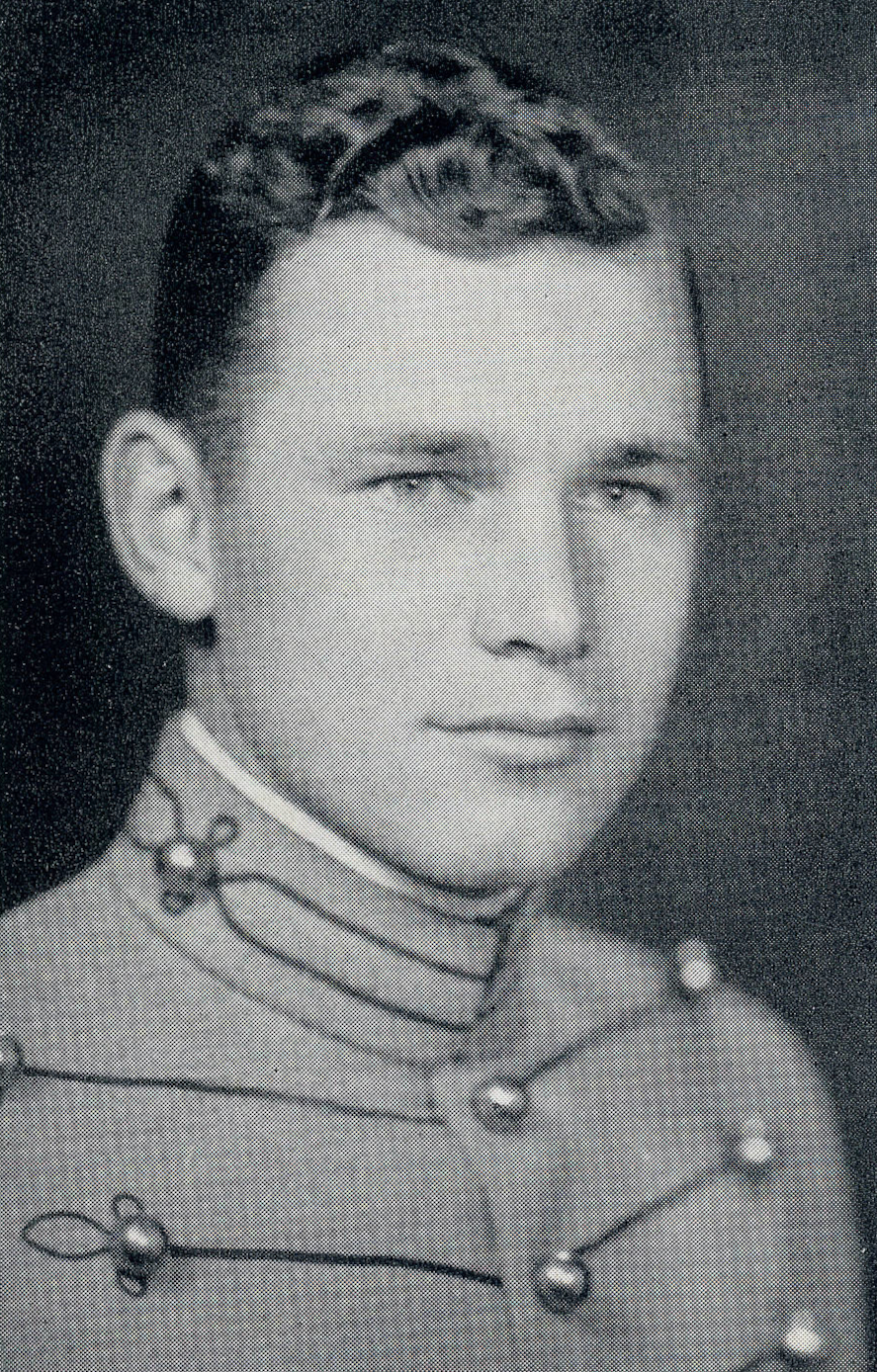
Reynolds as a United States Military Academy cadet c. 1933

Royal Reynolds Jr. was born on October 17, 1910, in California as a son of future Brigadier General Royal Reynolds and his wife Romietta Redman Reynolds. His uncle was Major General Charles R. Reynolds, who served as Surgeon General of the United States Army between 1935 and 1939. Royal Jr. attended the United States Military Academy at West Point, New York and graduated in 1933. He was then commissioned a second lieutenant and assigned to the infantry.

During World War II, Reynolds was assigned to the 57th Infantry Regiment, stationed at Philippines, where he was appointed commanding officer of the 1st Battalion. After the defeat by Japanese during the Battle of Philippines in May 1942, Reynolds refused to surrender and spent the remainder of the war as a guerrilla. For his service during the war, Reynolds received the Bronze Star Medal and Combat Infantryman Badge.

After the war, Reynolds remained on active duty in the Army and subsequently served with the 7th Infantry Division in the Korean War. He commanded a regiment during this conflict and was decorated with another Bronze Star Medal with "V" Device, Legion of Merit and also Silver Star for gallantry in action.

He also attended the Command and General Staff College at Fort Leavenworth, Kansas, and the Army War College.

In his late military career, Reynolds was promoted to the rank of brigadier general and served as Assistant Commander of the Infantry School at Fort Benning, Georgia. He received another Legion of Merit for his service in this capacity and finally retired from the military service in 1963.

Brigadier General Royal Reynolds Jr. died on November 24, 2003, at the age of 93 and is buried at Arlington National Cemetery, Virginia along with his father and mother.

== Decorations ==
Here is the ribbon bar of Brigadier General Reynolds Jr.:

Combat Infantryman Badge with one star
1st Row	Silver Star	Legion of Merit with Oak Leaf Cluster	Bronze Star with Oak Leaf Cluster and "V" Device	American Defense Service Medal with Foreign Service Clasp
2nd Row	Asiatic-Pacific Campaign Medal with two service stars	American Campaign Medal	World War II Victory Medal	National Defense Service Medal with Oak Leaf Cluster
3rd Row	Korean Service Medal with two service stars	Philippine Defense Medal	Philippine Liberation Medal	United Nations Korea Medal
