= Philippine Defense Medal =

Military award of the Philippines

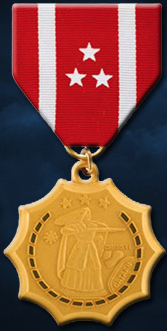
- Philippine Defense Medal
- Type: Service medal
- Presented by: Republic of the Philippines
- Eligibility: participation in the defense of the Philippine Islands between 8 December 1941 and 15 June 1942
- Status: Current
- Established: 20 December 1944 (Ribbon); 22 July 1945 (Medal)
- Service ribbon Streamer

The Philippine Defense Medal is a military award and decoration of the Republic of the Philippines which is awarded to recognize the initial resistance against Japanese invasion between 8 December 1941 and 15 June 1942. The award was first created in December 1944, and was issued as the Philippine Defense Ribbon. A full-sized medal was authorized and added in July, 1945.

== Criteria ==
The Philippine Defense Medal is presented to any service member, of either the Philippine military or an allied armed force, which participated in the defense of the Philippine Islands between December 8, 1941 and June 15, 1942. Participation in any engagement against the enemy in Philippine territory, in Philippine waters, or in the air over the Philippines or over Philippine waters. An individual will be considered as having participated in an engagement if they meet one of the following:

(A) Participation in any engagement against the enemy in Philippine territory, in Philippine waters, or in the air over the Philippines or over Philippine waters. An individual will be considered as having participated in an engagement if they meet one of the following.

(1) Was a member of the defense garrison of the Bataan Peninsula or of the fortified islands at the entrance to Manila Bay.

(2) Was a member of and present with a unit actually under enemy fire or air attack.

(3) Served on a ship that was under enemy fire or air attack.

(4) Was a crewmember or passenger in an airplane that was under enemy aerial or ground fire.

(B) Assigned or stationed in Philippine territory or in Philippine waters for not less than 30 days during the period.

(C) Individuals who meet conditions set forth in paragraphs (A) and (B) of this section are authorized to wear a bronze service star on the ribbon.

The Philippine Defense Medal was awarded to the United States and Philippine Commonwealth troops which defended the Philippines at Bataan and would later be captured and forced to endure the Bataan Death March.

== Recipients ==
- Ramon A. Alcaraz
- Antonín Volný
- Donald Blackburn
- John D. Bulkeley
- Jose Calugas
- James W. Coe
- Edwin A. Doss
- Richard W. Fellows
- Guy Fort
- Philip T. Fry
- Amado F. Gador
- Noel Gayler
- Harold Keith Johnson
- Edward P. King
- Emilio S. Liwanag
- Douglas MacArthur
- William G. Martin
- George F. Moore
- Emmett O'Donnell Jr.
- Moises Pama
- George M. Parker
- Royal Reynolds, Jr.
- Manuel F. Segura
- Susano Madril
- Edward Thiele
- Kemp Tolley
- Jesus M. Vargas
- Walter A. Ditto
- Jonathan M. Wainwright
- Frank D. Wagner
- Charles A. Willoughby
- Jose Montalvan
- Ramon Bagatsing

== Similar awards ==
Similar Philippine medals include the Philippine Liberation Medal and the Philippine Independence Medal. Members of the United States Armed Forces entitled to the Philippine Defense Medal were also eligible to receive the Asiatic-Pacific Campaign Medal with a bronze "battle star" (3/16" service star) for participation in the defense of the Philippines.

== See also ==
- Awards and decorations of the Armed Forces of the Philippines
