= 75th Infantry Regiment (United States) =

- Active: 1918–1919
- Country: United States
- Branch: United States Army
- Type: Infantry
- Size: Regiment
- Part of: 13th Division

The 75th Infantry Regiment was a Regular infantry regiment in the United States Army, briefly active during World War I as part of the 13th Division. It was reconstituted on paper during World War II and disbanded in the early 1950s.

== History ==
The 75th Infantry was constituted on 10 July 1918 in the Regular Army as the 75th Infantry and assigned to the 13th Division. It was organized in August 1918 at Camp Lewis, Washington, from personnel of the 1st Infantry. The 75th Infantry was part of the "square" 13th Division's complement of four regiments including the 1st, 44th, 75th, and 76th Infantry Regiments. It was never sent overseas during World War I, and was relieved from the 13th Division and demobilized on 27 February 1919 at Camp Lewis.

The 75th Infantry was reconstituted on 18 July 1941 in the Regular Army, but never activated. It was disbanded on 4 August 1952. The 75th was never authorized a coat of arms or distinctive unit insignia.

The present day 75th Ranger Regiment shares a number but no lineage with this regiment.
