= Arnold J. Funk =

United States Army general

- Born: August 13, 1895; Stayton, Oregon, US
- Died: December 29, 1980 (aged 85); Sarasota County, Florida
- Burial place: Arlington National Cemetery
- Military career
- Allegiance: United States of America
- Branch: United States Army
- Service years: 1913–1952
- Rank: Brigadier General
- Commands: 57th Infantry Regiment
- Conflicts: World War I World War II ● Battle of Bataan; Korean War
- Awards: Distinguished Service Medal (2); Silver Star Medal; Bronze Star Medal (2); Purple Heart

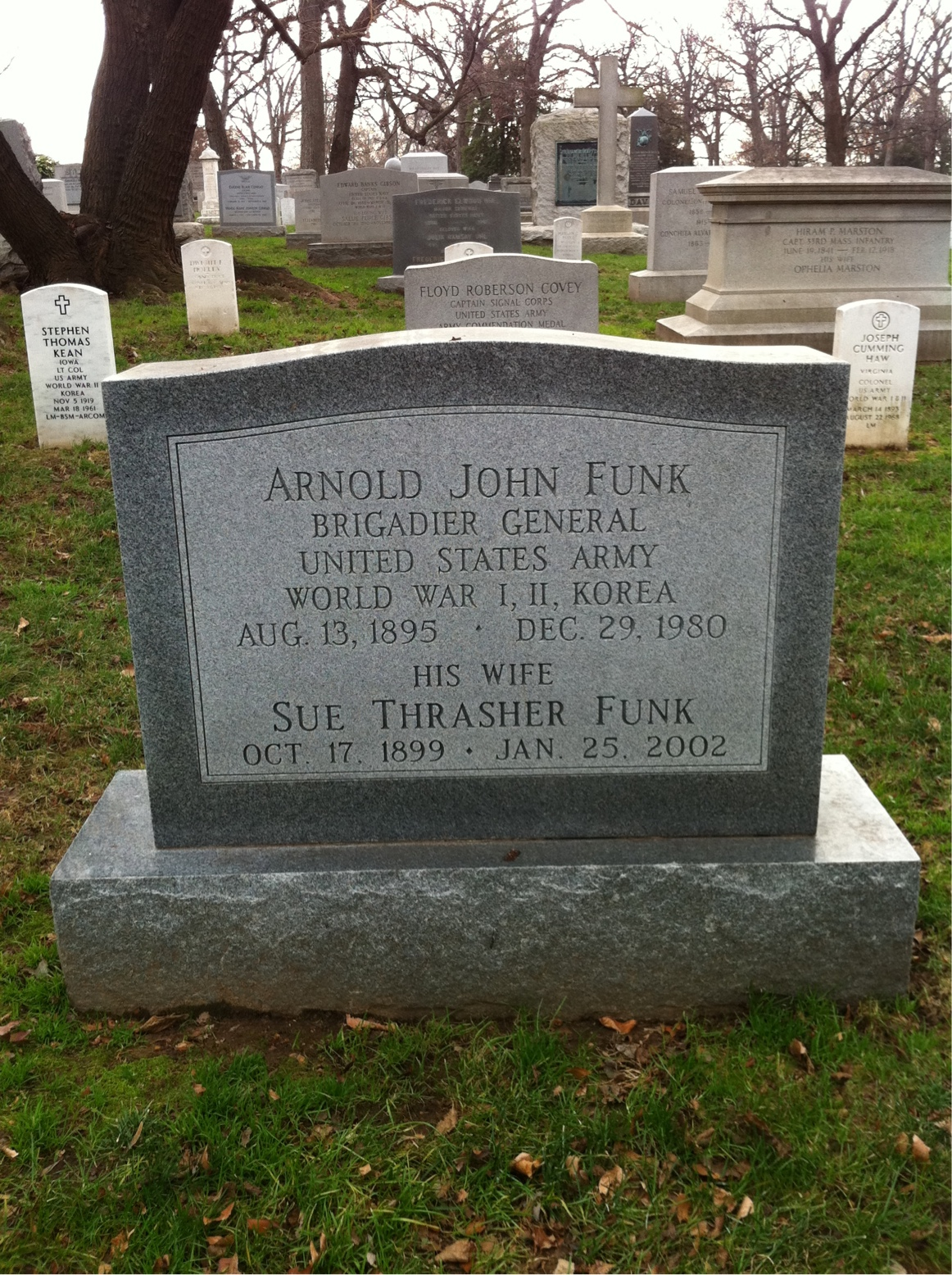
Grave of Arnold John Funk

Arnold John Funk (August 13, 1895 – December 29, 1980) was an American brigadier general and chief of staff to General Edward P. King, commander of the Philippine-American forces, during the Battle of Bataan.

Funk earned a B.S. degree from Oregon Agricultural College in 1916. He was commissioned as an infantry officer in June 1917. Funk served as a temporary captain during World War I.

Funk graduated from the Infantry School advanced course in 1932 and the Command and General Staff School in 1939. He was promoted to major in September 1934 and lieutenant colonel in July 1940.

Sent to the Philippines, Funk received temporary promotions to colonel in December 1941 and brigadier general in January 1942. After surrendering to Japanese forces, he spent over three years as a prisoner of war.

In April 1947, his promotion to colonel was made permanent retroactive to December 1945 and his temporary promotion to brigadier general was renewed. He retired from active duty as a brigadier general on May 31, 1952.

Funk died in Sarasota County, Florida. He was interred at Arlington National Cemetery on May 22, 1981.

== See also ==
- 57th Infantry Regiment (United States)
