= Philippine Scouts =

Defunct US Military unit based in the Philippines

- Maghahanap ng Pilipinas
- Philippine Scouts shoulder sleeve insignia from 1921–1947 was the head of the carabao (water buffalo) which symbolized the Philippines. The colors red and gold represented the islands' Spanish colonial roots.
- Active: 1901–1948
- Country: United States; Philippines
- Allegiance: United States (1901–1946); Insular Government (1901–1935); Commonwealth of the Philippines (1935–1946); Republic of the Philippines (1946–1948)
- Branch: United States Army; Philippine Division; 24th Field Artillery Regiment; 25th Field Artillery Regiment; 26th Cavalry Regiment (PS); 31st Infantry Regiment; 43d Infantry Regiment (PS); 44th Infantry Regiment; 45th Infantry Regiment (PS); 57th Infantry Regiment (PS); 91st Coast Artillery; 92nd Coast Artillery Regiment
- Colors: Red and Gold
- Mascot: Carabao
- Engagements: Philippine–American War; Moro Rebellion; World War II

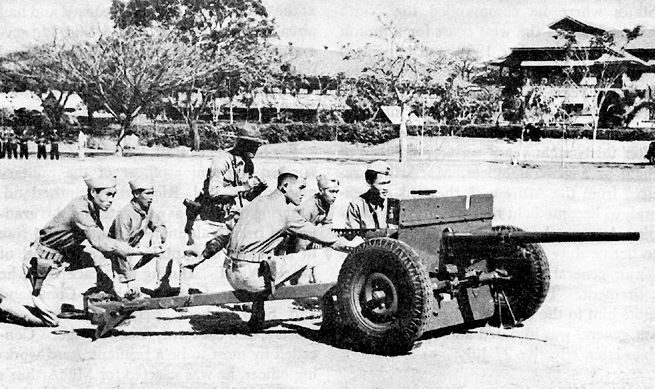
Philippine Scouts at Fort William McKinley firing a 37mm anti-tank gun in training.

The Philippine Scouts (Filipino: Maghahanap ng Pilipinas or Hukbong Maghahanap ng Pilipinas) was a military organization of the United States Army from 1901 until after the end of World War II. These troops were generally Filipinos and Filipino-Americans assigned to the United States Army Philippine Department, under the command of American commissioned officers (though a handful of Filipino Americans received commissions from the United States Military Academy). Philippine Scout units were given the suffix "(PS)", to distinguish them from other U.S. Army units.

The first Scout companies were organized by the U.S. in 1901 to combat the Philippine Revolutionary Army led at that time by General Emilio Aguinaldo. In 1919–1920, the PS companies were grouped into regiments as part of the United States Army and redesignated the 43d, 44th, 45th, and 57th Infantry Regiments, plus the 24th and 25th Field Artillery Regiments, the 26th Cavalry Regiment (PS) and the 91st and 92nd Coast Artillery Regiments. Service and support formations were also organized as engineer, medical, quartermaster and military police units. The infantry and field artillery regiments were grouped together with the U.S. 31st Infantry Regiment to form the U.S. Army's Philippine Division. At this point, the Scouts became the U.S. Army's front line troops in the Pacific.

The Philippine Department assigned the Scouts to subdue the Moro tribes on the island of Mindanao (see Moro rebellion), and to establish tranquility throughout the islands.

Philippine Scout regiments became the first United States Army units to be in combat during World War II, until the surrender of USAFFE in May 1942. Even after that some individual soldiers and units refused to surrender and became beginning elements of the resistance to the Japanese occupation. Later paroled POWs would also join the resistance.

== Macabebe Scouts ==
Macabebe Scouts
- Active: 1899–1901
- Country: United States (1899–1901)
- Allegiance: United States of America: Military Government (1899–1901)
- Branch: United States Army (1899–1901)
- Type: Militia, Irregulars
- Role: intelligence, reconnaissance
- Size: 1,402 personnel in December 1900
- Engagements: Philippine–American War; Moro rebellion

Commanders
- Notable commanders: General Henry Lawton; General Frederick Funston; Lieutenant Matthew A. Batson

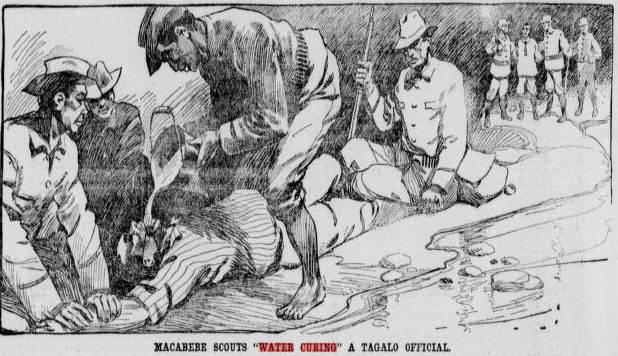
A newspaper depiction from 1902 of water curing by Macabebe Scouts against fellow Filipinos.

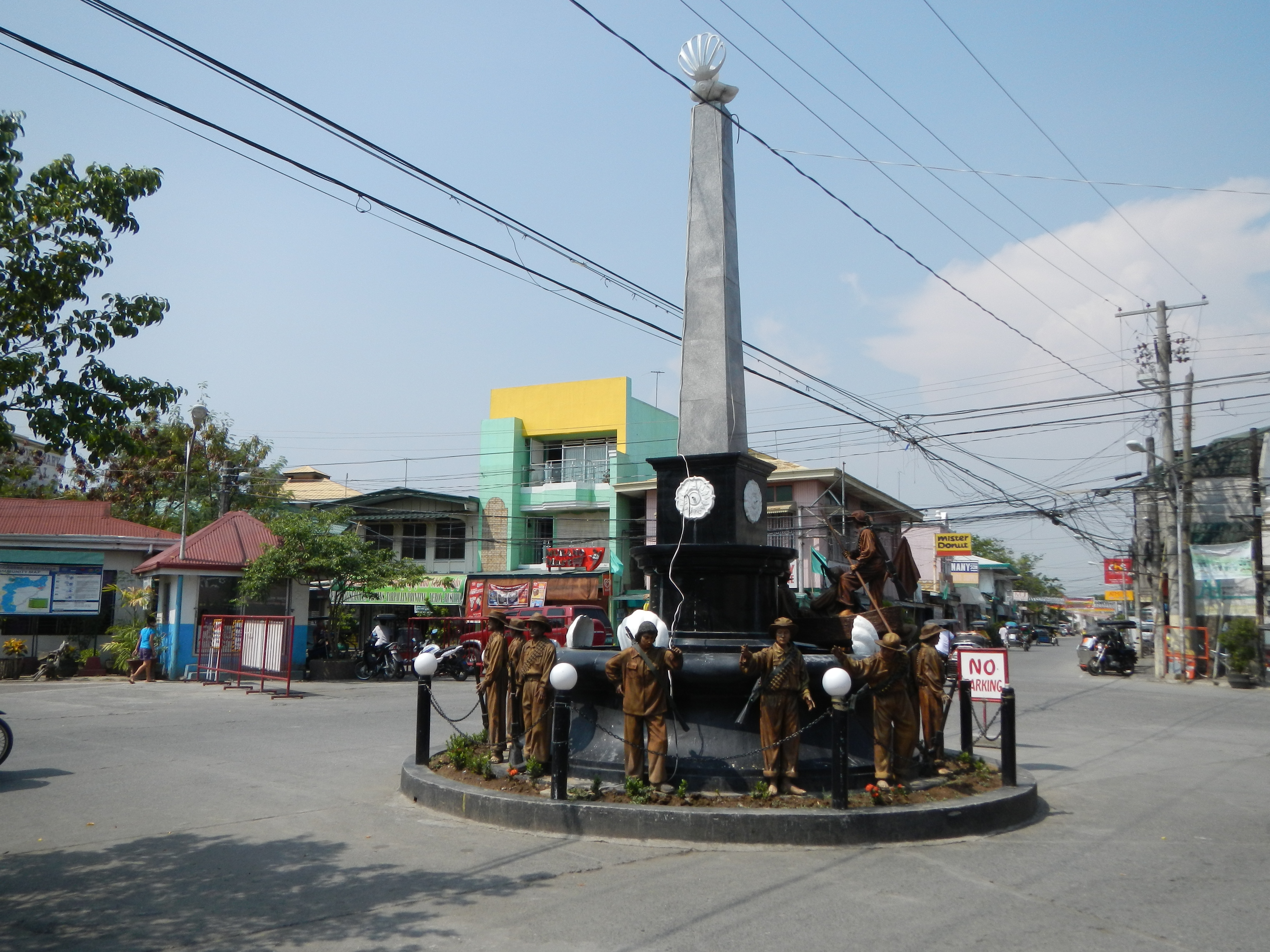
Macabebe Scouts monument-memorial (Macabebe, Pampanga: On April 23, 1901, the Macabebe scouts helped capture Aguinaldo in Palanan, Isabela).

In 1899, the town of Macabebe was ransacked by the Aguinaldo army, killing 300 residents inside the San Nicolas de Tolentino church. This event started the joining of the Macabebe scouts to the US army.

Native guides and a small number of former Spanish Army militia members from Macabebe that joined U.S. forces commanded by General Henry Lawton and, after authorization by General Elwell Otis, initially two, and later five companies of Macabebe Scouts were formed on September 10, 1899 under Lieutenant Matthew A. Batson. The Macabebes proved themselves reliable over the next two months, and Batson formed five companies of 128 men each; all veterans of service in the militia. Batson's Macabebe companies saw combat against Aguinaldo's forces beginning in October 1899, after which they were reorganized into "The Squadron of Philippine Cavalry, U.S. Volunteers" on June 1, 1900 and enlisted as irregulars; and eventually the capture of Aguinaldo in 1901. The Macabebes won lasting notability in the operation under General Frederick Funston to capture General Aguinaldo.

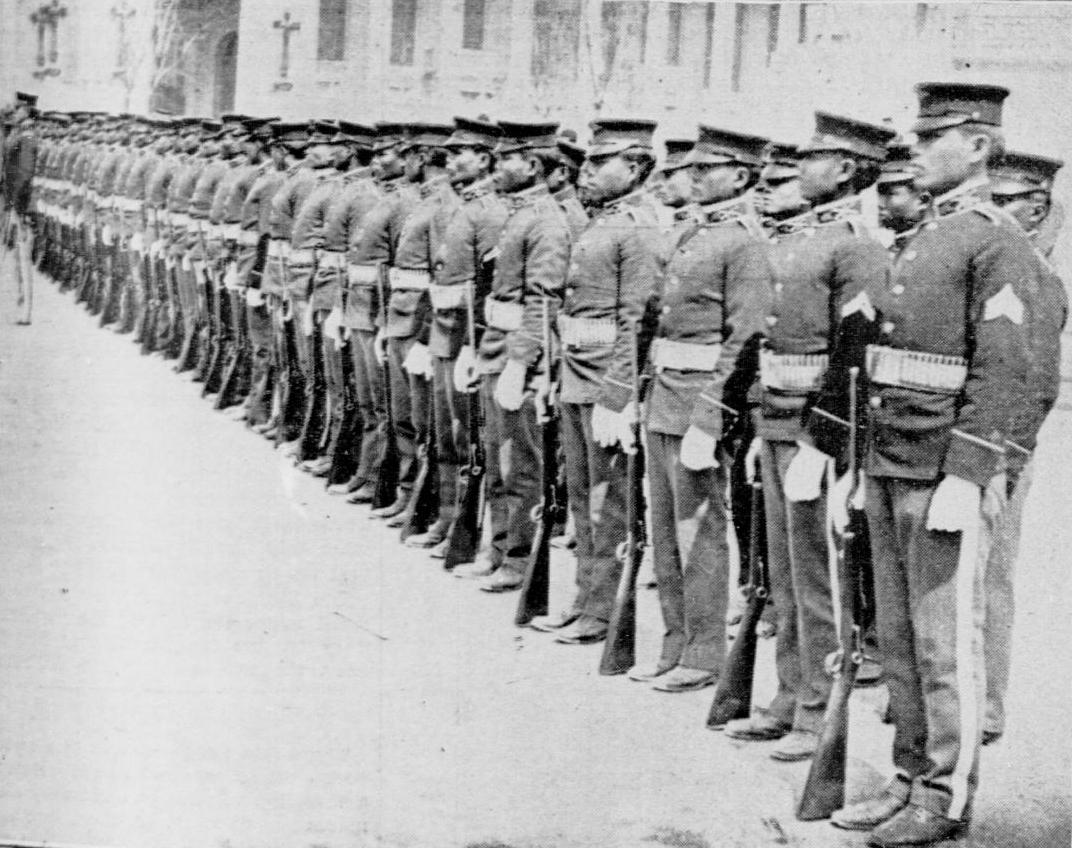
Formation of Philippine Scouts in 1905.

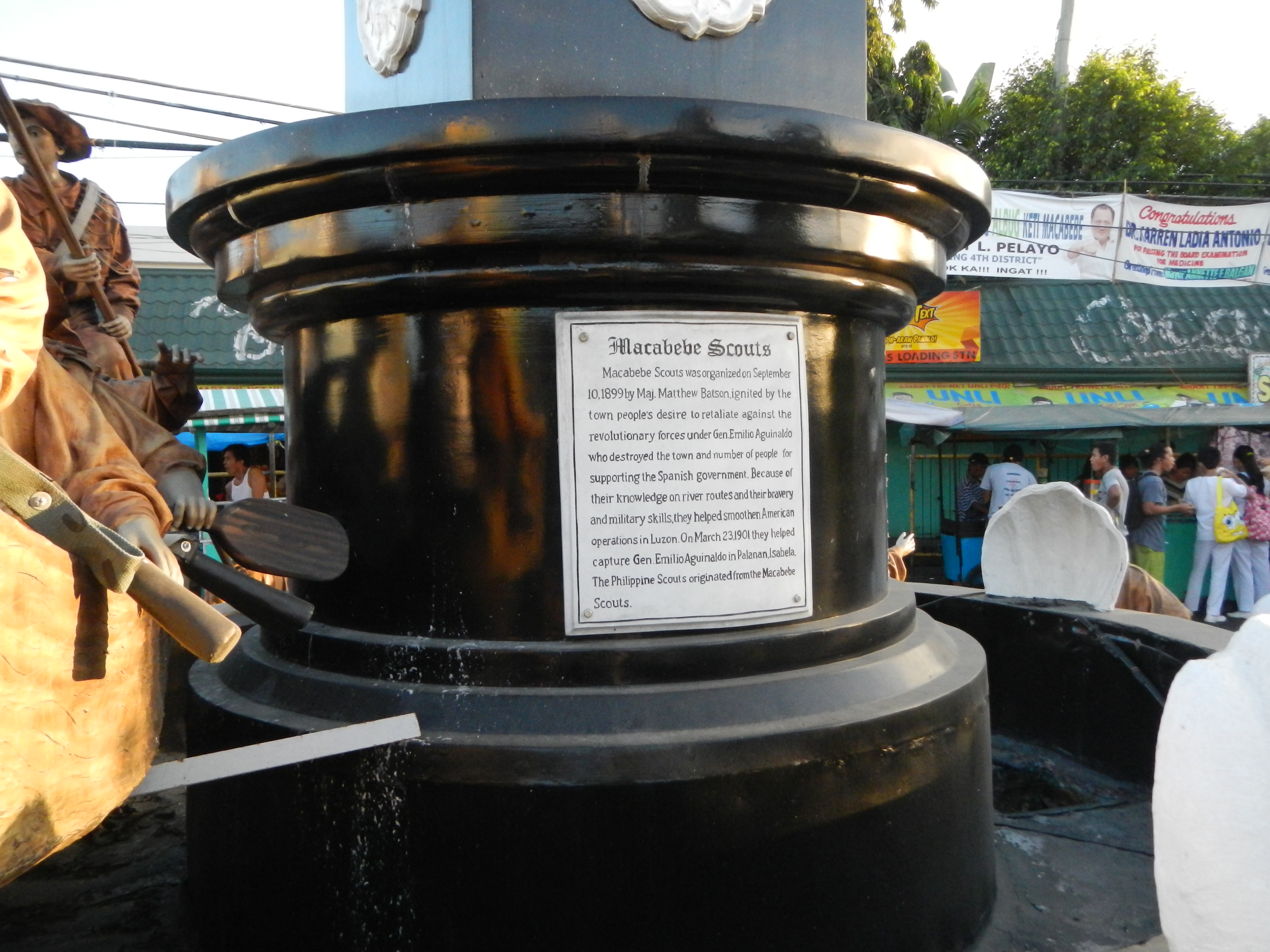
The marker (Macabebe, Pampanga downtown).

The Army Reorganization Act of 1901 authorized the formation of scout units of Philippine origin within the U.S. Army. On the Army's recommendation, U.S. President Theodore Roosevelt authorized the formation of a unified native Scouts organization. The Army activated this Native Scouts force in October 1901 by integrating 50 local companies into a single force of 5,000 men. Over the next ten years, the Scouts won accolades from their American commanders which contributed to their survival as a unit.

== Philippine Scouts and U.S. Army Forces in the Far East (USAFFE) ==
On July 26, 1941, in preparation for the coming war, President Roosevelt called General Douglas MacArthur back to active duty and put him in charge of a new military organization: The United States Army Forces in the Far East (USAFFE). MacArthur took command of all military forces in the Philippines except the U.S. Navy's Asiatic Fleet. The Philippine Division, Philippine Department and all other Philippine Scout units were included in USAFFE, as was the U.S. Army's Far East Air Force (FEAF). At the time of USAFFE's formation, the unit consisted of 22,532 troops, of which 11,972 were Philippine Scouts.

Of the 22,532 troops, 10,473 were members of the Philippine Division, itself containing 2,552 Americans and 7,921 Filipinos. All of the division's enlisted men, with the exception of the 31st Infantry Regiment and some of the military police and headquarters troops, were Philippine Scouts.

== Filipino Officers within the Philippine Division, July 1941 ==
In 1910, the U.S. Army began sending one outstanding Filipino soldier per year to West Point. Among these cadets were Vicente Lim (USMA, Class of 1914), Fidel V. Segundo (1917), Eustaquio S. Baclig (1918), Pastor Martelino (1920), and at least eight others. However, the first Filipino officer with the Philippine Scouts, Esteban Boadilla Dalao, had been commissioned in 1912 and rose to the rank of Colonel. By 1941 some of these men had risen to the rank of senior officers, and some transferred to the Philippine Army when the Philippine Commonwealth began to build up its own forces in 1937. In July 1941, there were fifteen Filipino Scout officers within the Philippine Division. Two were in the Headquarters, two were amongst the Special Troops, three in the 45th Infantry Regiment (PS), one in the 57th Infantry Regiment (PS), five in the 24th Field Artillery Regiment (PS), one in the 12th Quartermaster Regiment (PS), and one in the 14th Engineer Regiment (PS).

Strength of the Philippine Division, July 31, 1941
Unit	Total	Officers	Enlisted		
Unit	Total	Officers	Total	American	Filipino
All Units	10,473	516^{[a]}	9,957	2,036	7,921
Hq and Hq Co	181	30	151	4	147
Special Troops	5	5	0	0	0
31st Infantry	2,100	114	1,986	1,986	0
45th Infantry	2,265	117	2,148	1	2,147
57th Infantry	2,279	118	2,161	0	2,161
23rd FA Regt	401	10	391	0	804
24th FA Regt	843	39	804	0	804
12th MP Co	136	5	131	5	86
12th QM Regt	592	18	574	0	574
12th Ord Co	142	3	139	0	139
12th Sig regt	227	10	217	0	217
4th Vet Co	11	1	10	0	10

^{a} Includes 15 Philippine Scout officers: 2 Hq, 2 Sp Trs, 3 45th Inf, 1 57th Inf, 5 24th FA Regt, 1 12th QM Regt, and 1 14th Engr.
Source: Phil Dept, Machine Rcds Unit Station Strength and Misc., Officers and Enlisted Men, Jul 41.

== World War II ==
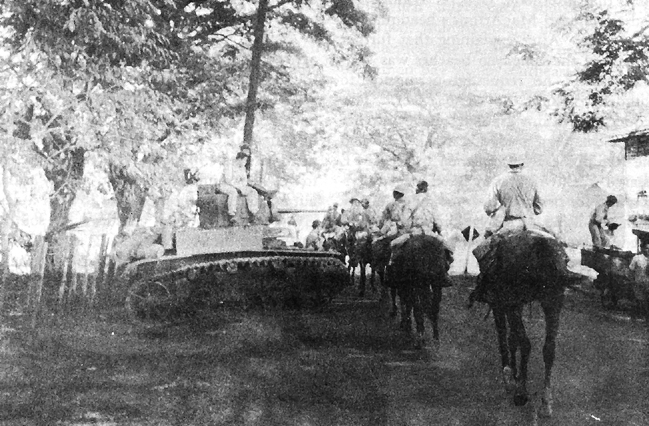
26th Cavalry moving into Pozorrubio pass a General Stuart light tank, M3 in 1942.

On December 7, 1941, (December 8, 1941, local time in Asia), Imperial Japanese forces attacked the U.S. Navy's Pacific Fleet at Pearl Harbor, bombed the U.S. Army's Far East Air Force at Clark Field in the Philippines, attacked British Hong Kong, and landed troops on the shores of British Malaya, simultaneously. Over the next three months the Japanese Army marched through Southeast Asia, and by March 1942 the Japanese had completely overrun every country and island in the western Pacific — except the Philippines.

On the Bataan Peninsula of Luzon Island, the Philippine Scouts, a few U.S. Army National Guard units, and ten divisions of poorly equipped, almost untrained Philippine Army soldiers held out against the Japanese. Survivors of the Battle of Bataan, to a man, describe the Philippine Scouts as the backbone of the American defense there. President Franklin Roosevelt awarded the U.S. Army's first three Medals of Honor of World War II to Philippine Scouts: to Sergeant Jose Calugas for action at Culis, Bataan on January 6, 1942, to Lieutenant Alexander R. Nininger for action near Abucay, Bataan on January 12, and to Lieutenant Willibald C. Bianchi for action near Bagac, Bataan on February 3, 1942.

With the U.S. Navy at Pearl Harbor in shambles, and the Japanese Navy blockading the Philippines, there was no way to send adequate amounts of food, medicine, ammunition or reinforcements to Bataan. Early in the campaign, in January 1942, General MacArthur ordered that his forces be fed one-half daily rations because the USAFFE food-stocks on Bataan were insufficient for the planned six-month siege. Such a diet did not provide enough calories for men working and fighting in the tropical heat of the Philippines' Dry Season. Nonetheless, the Scouts and the other soldiers held out for more than four months without adequate food or medicine, while malaria, dysentery and malnutrition ravaged their ranks, and Japanese attacks drove them further down the Bataan Peninsula. In the midst of the Battle of Bataan, on March 11, 1942, U.S. President Franklin D. Roosevelt ordered General Douglas MacArthur spirited out of the Philippines by PT boat and airplane.

== Prisoners of war ==
The Battle of Bataan ended on April 9, 1942, when Major General Edward P. King, Jr., surrendered rather than see any more of his starving, diseased men slaughtered by the advancing enemy. At that point 70,000 men became prisoners of war: about 16,000 Americans and 54,000 Filipinos. Japanese soldiers marched the emaciated Scouts, American soldiers, and Philippine Army men sixty-five miles up the Bataan Peninsula's East Road on the notorious "March of Death", the Bataan Death March. During the March, Japanese guards shot or bayoneted between 7,000 and 10,000 men who fell, attempted to escape, or just stopped to quench their thirst at roadside spigots or puddles. They also beat and sometimes killed Filipino civilians who attempted to give food and water to the POWs, and at times flashed the "V" for "Victory" hand-gesture to the defeated soldiers along the length of the Death March. The March ended at the railroad head in San Fernando, Pampanga province. There the POWs were forced into overcrowded "40 and 10" railroad cars, which only had enough room for them to sit down in shifts on the final leg of the trip to Capas, Tarlac province. At Capas they were herded into Camp O'Donnell, a former Philippine Army training camp, which was to be their prison camp.

At Camp O'Donnell the Japanese crammed all 60,000 survivors into a Philippine Army camp designed to accommodate 10,000 men. There, the Japanese commander greeted each new group of arrivals with the discouraging "Goddamn you to Hell" speech in his native language, and assured the men that they were "captives," not Prisoners of war, and would be treated as such. There was little running water, sparse food, no medical care, and only slit trenches for sanitation. The heat was intolerable, flies rose out of the latrines and covered the prisoner's food, and malaria, dysentery, beriberi and a host of other diseases swept through the crowds of men. They began to die at the rate of four hundred per day.

From September through December 1942, the Japanese gradually paroled the surviving Philippine Scouts and other Filipino soldiers to their families and to the mayors of their hometowns. But by the time Camp O'Donnell closed in January 1943, after eight months of operation, 26,000 of the 50,000 Filipino prisoners of war had died there.

The Japanese transferred the American prisoners to Cabanatuan, Nueva Ecija province, where conditions were only marginally better. But as U.S. forces pulled closer to the Philippines in 1944, they evacuated the healthiest American prisoners to Japan and Manchuria, for use as slave laborers. Thousands of men were crammed into the dark holds of cargo ships so tightly that they could not sit or lay down. Again, food and water were scarce, sanitary facilities were non-existent, and the heat in the closed holds of the ships was unbearable. Men suffocated to death standing up. The Japanese ships were unmarked and some of them were torpedoed by American submarines. More of the men died of malnutrition and exposure in the work camps. By the time Japan surrendered and the U.S. and Filipino Army liberated the Bataan prisoners of war, two-thirds of the American prisoners had died in Japanese custody.

== Liberation and the "New" Scouts ==
During the Japanese occupation of the Philippines an extensive Filipino guerrilla movement sprang up. In some cases the guerrilla units were led by escaped American officers (e.g., Wendell Fertig) and often included "paroled" Philippine Scout and Philippine Commonwealth Army soldiers, along with civilian members of the Philippine underground. As MacArthur's forces, supported by the guerrillas, liberated the Philippine Islands, the surviving Philippine Scouts stepped forward and rejoined the U.S. Army. The Filipino guerrillas joined them, and the U.S. Army set up new Philippine Scout units, reconstituting the old Philippine Division as the 12th Infantry Division. Subordinate units included the 43rd, 44th and 45th Infantry Regiments (PS); 23rd, 24th and 88th Field Artillery Units (PS) Battalions; 56th Engineer Battalion (PS) and the 57th Infantry Regiment (PS). The "New Scouts" actively participated in combat against the Japanese Army in north Luzon, served as military police to restore order and help locate pockets of escaped Japanese in the south, and served as occupation forces on Okinawa. As planning for the invasion of Japan progressed, the Philippine Scouts were included in the invasion forces, and were selected to become part of the occupying force once Japan was defeated.

After Japan surrendered in August 1945, the United States granted the Republic of the Philippines full independence on July 4, 1946. At that point the ethnically Filipino Philippine Scouts held a unique status in U.S. military history: they were soldiers in the regular U.S. Army, but now they were citizens of a foreign country. To solve this dilemma, the United States offered the Filipinos in the Philippine Scouts full U.S. citizenship. Many of the surviving Scouts, perhaps around 1,000, accepted, and the Army transferred them to other units to finish their military careers.

With the consent of the Philippine government, Congress approved the maintenance of 50,000 Philippine Scouts. Under Major General Hibbs, Philippine Division as the 12th Infantry Division (PS) was reconstituted. Unlike its previous organization enlisted personnel of the division were exclusively Philippine Scouts. The War Department also proposed organizing a second Philippine Scout division, the 14th, but never did so. In the end President Truman disbanded the Philippine Scouts as an official element of the United States Army, and all of their unit colors were retired in 1947, and finally disbanded in December 1948.

== Legacy ==
Many of the former Philippine Scouts went on to serve the new Philippine Army, as well as the United States Army in military careers of twenty and more years, campaigning in the Korean War, the build-up to the planned invasion of Cuba during the October 1962 Missile Crisis, the Vietnam War, and the Cold War. Children of the Scouts (known as "Army Soup" in pre-World War II Fort William McKinley days) sometimes carried on their fathers' military traditions and also became U.S. Army soldiers and Marines. Two Philippine Scout children even earned the stars of U.S. Army generals: Lt. General Edward Soriano and Major General Antonio M. Taguba. A third, Brig. General Oscar Hilman, a native of Washington state and an armor officer who had started out as an enlisted man, earned his star in a long career in the Army National Guard.

Unlike other non-citizen veterans, veterans of the Philippine Division and other Filipinos who fought as part of the USAFFE were never granted citizenship. Since 1993, various bills have been introduced to the United States Congress under the name Filipino Veterans Fairness Act to rectify this. However, this was a complicated matter as after the liberation of the Philippines members of the Philippine Scouts were offered enlistments and in some applicable cases commissions in the U.S. Army and subsequent citizenship. Large numbers of "old" Philippine Scouts (those enlisting before or during World War II) took advantage of this. However, most "new" Philippine Scouts (those recruited following the war, mostly for occupation duty on Okinawa and elsewhere) were not offered citizenship. Language similar to the aforementioned proposed legislation was inserted by the Senate into the American Recovery and Reinvestment Act of 2009 which was signed into law. This provided a one-time payment to those veterans who are recognized as being soldiers or recognized guerrilla members by the United States or their surviving spouse. Even this, however, falls far short of the benefits available to similar veterans of other units.

In 2012, a documentary film named Forgotten Soldiers was produced by Donald A. Pata, with the help of Associate Instructor Chris Schaefer of the University of Utah, and narrated by Lou Diamond Phillips. The film received awards from the City of Los Angeles, the California Senate, County of Los Angeles, and at the Beloit International Film Festival.

== Notable Philippine Scouts ==
- Vicente Barros – Major, U.S. Army, the only Filipino officer among the ranks of Americans during the formation of the Philippine National Guard in 1917. Became advisor to the Philippine Commonwealth militia, the National Volunteers of the Philippines in 1935.
- Vicente Lim - Brigadier General, first Filipino graduate of the United States Military Academy
- Mateo M. Capinpin - Brigadier General, Commanding General of the 21st Division of the Philippine Army at the Battle of Bataan.
- Willibald C. Bianchi – First Lieutenant, U.S. Army. Medal of Honor recipient, 45th Infantry Regiment
- Jose Calugas – Captain, U.S. Army. Medal of Honor recipient, 88th Field Artillery Regiment
- Philip T. Fry - Commanded C Battalion, 57th Infantry during initial Japanese attack at Abucay. Received the Silver Star for this action and the Bronze Star as a POW after the Bataan Death March.
- Eddie Garcia – Sergeant, 116th Military Police Company. Actor, previously a Philippine Scout in Okinawa.
- Louis C. Mosher – First Lieutenant, U.S. Army. Medal of Honor recipient
- Alexander R. Nininger – Second Lieutenant, U.S. Army. First Medal of Honor recipient in World War II, 57th Infantry Regiment
- José B. Nísperos – Private First Class, U.S. Army. First Asian Medal of Honor recipient, 34th Company
- Juan Pajota – Captain, U.S. Army, 45th Infantry Regiment
- Edwin Ramsey – First Lieutenant, U.S. Army. Led last horse cavalry charge in U.S. military history, 26th Cavalry Regiment
- Benigno G. Tabora – Sergeant Major, U.S. Army. Purple Heart recipient
- Miguel White – Lieutenant, Philippine Army. Olympian, previously a Philippine Scout.
- Teofilo Yldefonso – Sergeant, U.S. Army. Olympian, 57th Infantry Regiment.

== See also ==
- Alamo Scouts
- Apache Scouts
- Eskimo Scouts
- Military history of Asian Americans
- Military History of the Philippines
- Military History of the United States
- Navajo Scouts
- Philippine Scout Mutiny
- United States Army Indian Scouts

== Bibliography and references ==
=== Sources ===
- Braden, Charles (1920). Wirt Robinson (ed.). Biographical register of the officers and graduates of the U.S. Military Academy at West Point, N.Y.: from its establishment, in 1802, to 1890, with the early history of the United States Military Academy. University of Michigan: Houghton, Mifflin.
- Coffman, Edward M. (1977). "Batson of the Philippine Scouts". Journal of the U.S. Army War College. VII (3).
- García, Florentino Rodao; Rodríguez, Felice Noelle (2001). The Philippine Revolution of 1896: Ordinary Lives in Extraordinary Times. Honolulu, HI: University of Hawaii Press. ISBN 978-971-550-386-0. OCLC 53224282.
- Knox, Donald (1981). Death March: The Survivors of Bataan. Harcourt Brace Jovanovich. ISBN 978-0-15-124094-4.
- Linn, Brian McAllister (1999). Guardians of Empire: The U.S. Army and the Pacific, 1902–1940. UNC Press Books. ISBN 978-0-8078-4815-9.
- Morton (2004). The Fall of the Philippines. University Press of the Pacific. ISBN 978-1-4102-1696-0.
- Philippine Scouts Heritage Society (1996). The Philippine Scouts. The Society.
- Olson, John E. (1985). O'Donnell, Andersonville of the Pacific. J.E. Olson. ISBN 9780964443211.
- United States War Dept (2009). Annual Reports of the Secretary of War. Books LLC. ISBN 978-1-4588-1628-3.
