= Pettit Barracks =

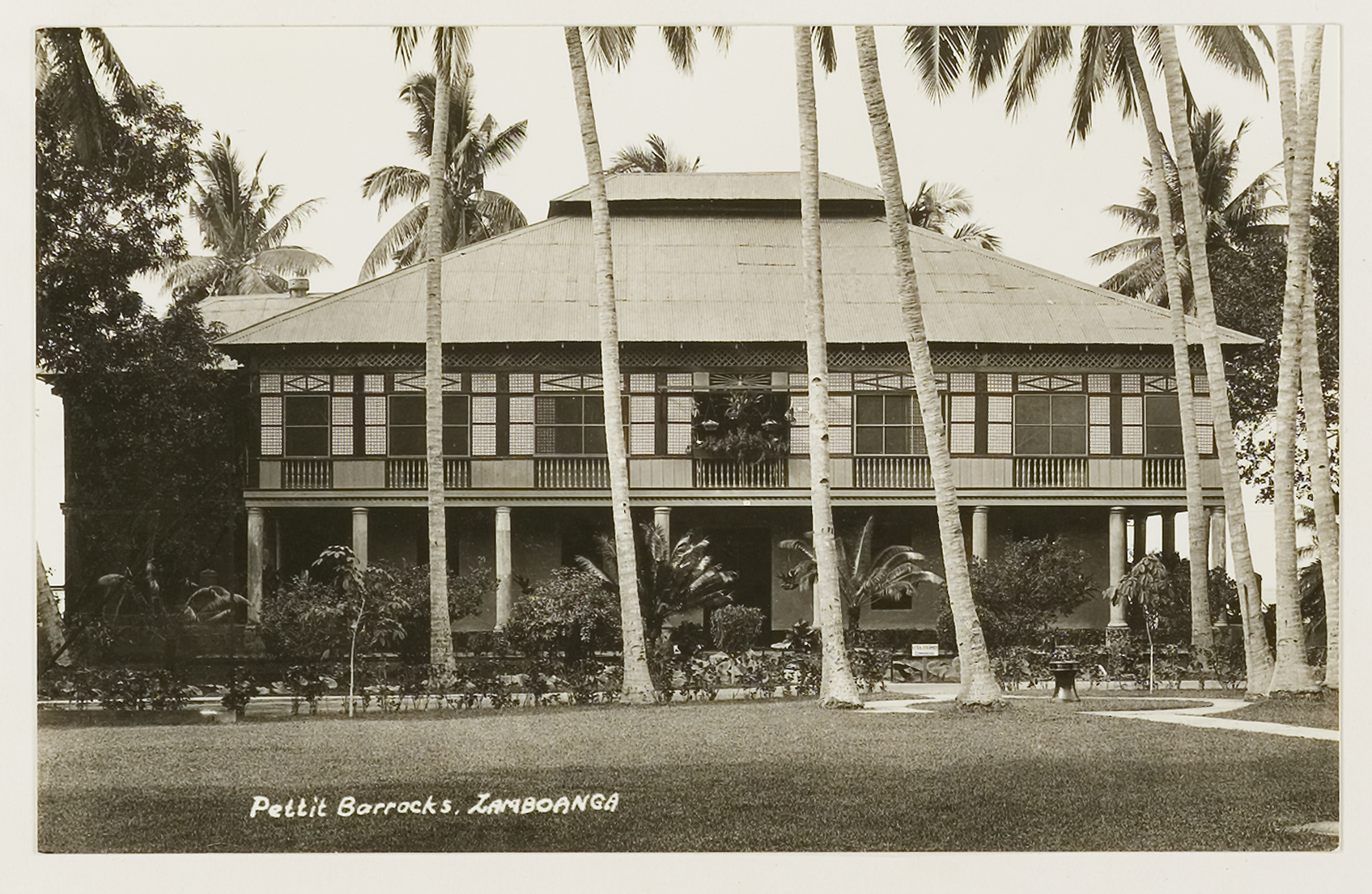
Building at Pettit Barracks, c. 1930

Pettit Barracks was located in Zamboanga City (Mindanao, the Philippines) and, along with Camp John Hay, was the location of the US Army's 43d Infantry Regiment (PS). It is located at the east edge of the city and housed US Army officers and their families. The barracks was once considered the US Army's most distant post.

In 1974, the Zamboanga Barter Traders Kilusang Bayan Inc. established a barter trade market in the area.
