= Edward P. King =

United States Army general

Edward Postell King
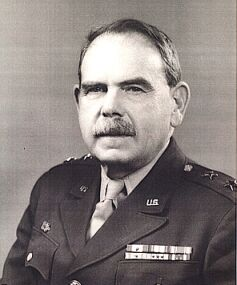
- General Edward King
- Born: July 4, 1884; Atlanta, Georgia
- Died: August 31, 1958 (aged 74); Brunswick, Georgia
- Burial place: Cemetery of St. John in the Wilderness Episcopal Church; Flat Rock, NC
- Military career
- Allegiance: United States of America
- Branch: United States Army
- Service years: 1908–1946
- Rank: Major General
- Service number: 0-2442
- Commands: Commanding General, Northern Luzon
- Conflicts: World War I World War II
- Awards: Distinguished Service Medal (2)

Edward Postell King Jr. (July 4, 1884 – August 31, 1958) was a major general in the United States Army who gained prominence for leading the defense of the Bataan Peninsula in the Battle of Bataan against the Japanese invasion of the Philippines in World War II.

== Education ==
King was born in Atlanta, Georgia, in 1884. As the grandson and nephew of Confederate soldiers during the American Civil War, King had a strong desire to join the US Army. He entered the University of Georgia, where he was a member of the Phi Delta Theta fraternity, graduating in 1902.

== Early military career ==
Initially, King's family wanted him to be a lawyer, but he desired a more adventurous career. He was commissioned as a second lieutenant of infantry in the Georgia National Guard in February 1905. King applied for and received a commission as a second lieutenant of field artillery in the Army in 1908. He served with distinction during World War I, earning the Army Distinguished Service Medal. On 9 July 1918, President Wilson authorized the awarding of the Army's Distinguished Service Medal to Major King, with the citation for the medal reading as follows:

The President of the United States of America, authorized by Act of Congress, July 9, 1918, takes pleasure in presenting the Army Distinguished Service Medal to Major (Field Artillery) Edward P. King, Jr., United States Army, for exceptionally meritorious and distinguished services to the Government of the United States, in a duty of great responsibility during World War I. As Principal Assistant to the Chief of Field Artillery, from 23 March 1918 to 11 November 1918, Major King contributed largely to the successful solution of the difficult problems of expansion, organization, and training which then confronted the Field Artillery.

After the war, King was an honor graduate of the Command and General Staff School in 1923 and then graduated from the Army War College in 1930 and the Navy War College in 1937. Between World War I and World War II, he held several important assignments, including that of instructor in both the Army and Navy War Colleges. In 1940, King was sent to the Philippines, where he was promptly promoted to brigadier general; he served as General Douglas MacArthur's second highest-ranking ground officer, after General Jonathan Wainwright.

== World War II ==
On 21 March 1942, after MacArthur was ordered by President Franklin D. Roosevelt to Australia, Wainwright was given command of the United States Forces in the Philippines, and King became the commanding general of the Luzon Force located on the Bataan Peninsula. King, an artilleryman, had served in the Philippines with the 2nd Field Artillery in 1915–1917.

After months of fighting the invading Japanese Army and with food and medicine exhausted, King himself, accepting sole responsibility to disobey MacArthur's and Wainwright's orders, chose to surrender his troops on 9 April 1942 (this day is commemorated in the Philippines as the Araw ng Kagitingan, or "Day of Valor"). A combined American and Filipino force of over 76,000 surrendered; this was the largest surrender of a military force in both American and Filipino history. Thousands of these soldiers died under Japanese captivity during the ensuing Bataan Death March and imprisonment.

Wainwright and his men, numbering 10,000, held on to Corregidor until they too were forced to surrender on 6 May 1942.

King spent three and half years as a captive of the Japanese, who often mistreated him due to his rank. Both Wainwright and King expected to be court-martialled for disobeying orders that they should not surrender. However, they were treated as heroes when they were finally freed, with King being awarded an oak leaf cluster to his Army DSM:

The President of the United States of America, authorized by Act of Congress, July 9, 1918, takes pleasure in presenting a Bronze Oak Leaf Cluster in lieu of a Second Award of the Army Distinguished Service Medal to Major General Edward P. King, Jr. (ASN: 0-2442), United States Army, for exceptionally meritorious and distinguished services to the Government of the United States, in a duty of great responsibility in the Philippine Islands from 1 December 1941 to 11 March 1942. He coordinated the employment of all field artillery units in the defense of the Bataan Peninsula, and the allocation of available munitions. The effectiveness of his planning and supervision was demonstrated by the superior performance of the artillery units throughout the operations. The singularly distinctive accomplishments of Major General King reflect the highest credit upon himself and the United States Army.

== Decorations ==

1st Row	Army Distinguished Service Medal with oak leaf cluster	World War I Victory Medal	American Defense Service Medal with "Foreign Service" clasp
2nd Row	Asiatic-Pacific Campaign Medal with campaign star	World War II Victory Medal	Philippine Defense Medal with service star

== Postwar ==
After the war, King returned to the United States where he retired to a home in Georgia, devoting himself to many volunteer causes, such as the Red Cross. He died in 1958, and is buried at the Cemetery of St. John in the Wilderness Episcopal Church, Flat Rock, North Carolina.

== In literature ==
Writer John Grisham utilizes King as a character in his fictional novel The Reckoning. Part of the story takes place at Camp O'Donnell during World War II.

== See also ==
- Arnold J. Funk
