= Fely Franquelli =

Filipino dancer, choreographer and actress

- Born: November 11, 1916; Manila, Philippine Islands
- Died: January 8, 2002 (aged 85); Metro Manila, Philippines
- Resting place: Arlington National Cemetery
- Years active: 1943–1945
- Spouse: Howard J. Hutter (? - ?) (his death)

Fely Franquelli (November 11, 1916 – January 8, 2002) was a Filipino dancer, choreographer, and actress. Franquelli became known in the international dance scene in the 1930s.

== Early life and career ==
Franquelli, who was of Filipino, Spanish and Italian descent, was born in Manila. She attended school in the Philippines and Hong Kong before immigrating to the United States, where she attended the University of Southern California. The widow of a former Army surgeon, Fely was buried at Arlington National Cemetery beside her husband after he death aged 85.

According to Salvador P. Lopez, she was a dancer who exuded the poise of a polished professional with the smoothness, the grace and the skill that come with confidence in oneself and with certitude of knowledge. She had a brief film career and her most known role was in Back to Bataan as Dalisay Delgado, the former fiancée of Captain Andrés Bonifacio. Delgado appeared to be a collaborator with her radio broadcasts of Japanese propaganda, which she secretly used to relay sensitive information to the Filipino resistance movement.

== Choreography ==
Listed below are some dances that Franquelli created:

- Hindu Temple Dance
- White Eagle (Navajo)
- Chinese Legend (about the goddess of beauty Ming Toy from Hainan)
- Tabu (African)
- Sacro Monte (a paso doble)
- Bulerías (a flamenco from Málaga)
- Gypsy Fortune Teller (a zambra in Granada)
- Jarabe (Mexican)
- Le Singe Qui Danse (a monkey dance)
- The Beast
- Planting Rice
- Tinikling

== Filmography ==
- Back to Bataan (1945) as Dalisay Delgado
- Cry 'Havoc' (1943) as Luisita Esperito
- The Fallen Sparrow (1943) (uncredited) as Gypsy Dancer
- The Leopard Man (1943) (uncredited) as Rosita
