= Philippine National Guard =

Former component of the US National Guard of the Philippines

- Founded: 1917 – 1921
- Country: United States
- Allegiance: Philippine Island
- Branch: United States Army
- Type: National Guard
- Role: Provide soldiers to the U.S. Army in national emergencies or when requested by the president of the United States;
- Size: 25,000 soldiers
- Part of: National Guard Bureau; United States Department of War
- Engagements: World War I

Commanders
- Commander-in-chief: Governor General of the Philippines
- Notable commanders: Gen. John J. Pershing

The Philippine National Guard was a militia created by the Philippine Assembly in 1917. It would serve under General John Pershing in Europe during World War I. The Philippine Legislature, led by Senate President Manuel Quezon, offered the United States some assistance during World War I. It had 25,000 soldiers when it was absorbed by the National Army.

== History ==
The total cost of raising the unit was under three million dollars. When it was formed, General Francis B. Harrison objected to the new unit being described as a National Guard unit on the grounds of it being only a volunteer organisation raised for war purposes. This led to it being referred to as "Philippine National Guard Volunteers". Whilst it was officially a National Guard unit, it was under the control of the Government of the Philippines rather than the American Militia Bureau. This unit, however, was not able to see action, for it was only mustered into federal service on Armistice Day and would never leave the islands. In 1918, the majority of the University of the Philippines' College of Agriculture signed up to join the National Guard. Ever year in October, they celebrate Loyalty Day at the University to commemorate their service and to dedicate students to volunteering.

It was held by the Judge Advocate General of the United States Army in 1919 that a commissioned American officer may, with the consent of the President of the United States, concurrently hold a commission within the Philippine National Guard without forfeiting privileges. After the war, the entire National Guard unit was deactivated, then formally disbanded in 1921. Its officers were placed on the reserve list. The unit cost the Insular Government nearly 4.8 million pesos.

=== Air operations ===
The Philippine National Guard included elements of the United States Army Air Service. Those selected were sent to train at the Curtiss School of Aviation, flying Curtiss Jennys.

== See also ==
- Philippine Department
- USS Rizal
- Military history of Asian Americans
- Military history of the Philippines
- Military history of the United States
