= 45th Infantry Regiment (United States) =

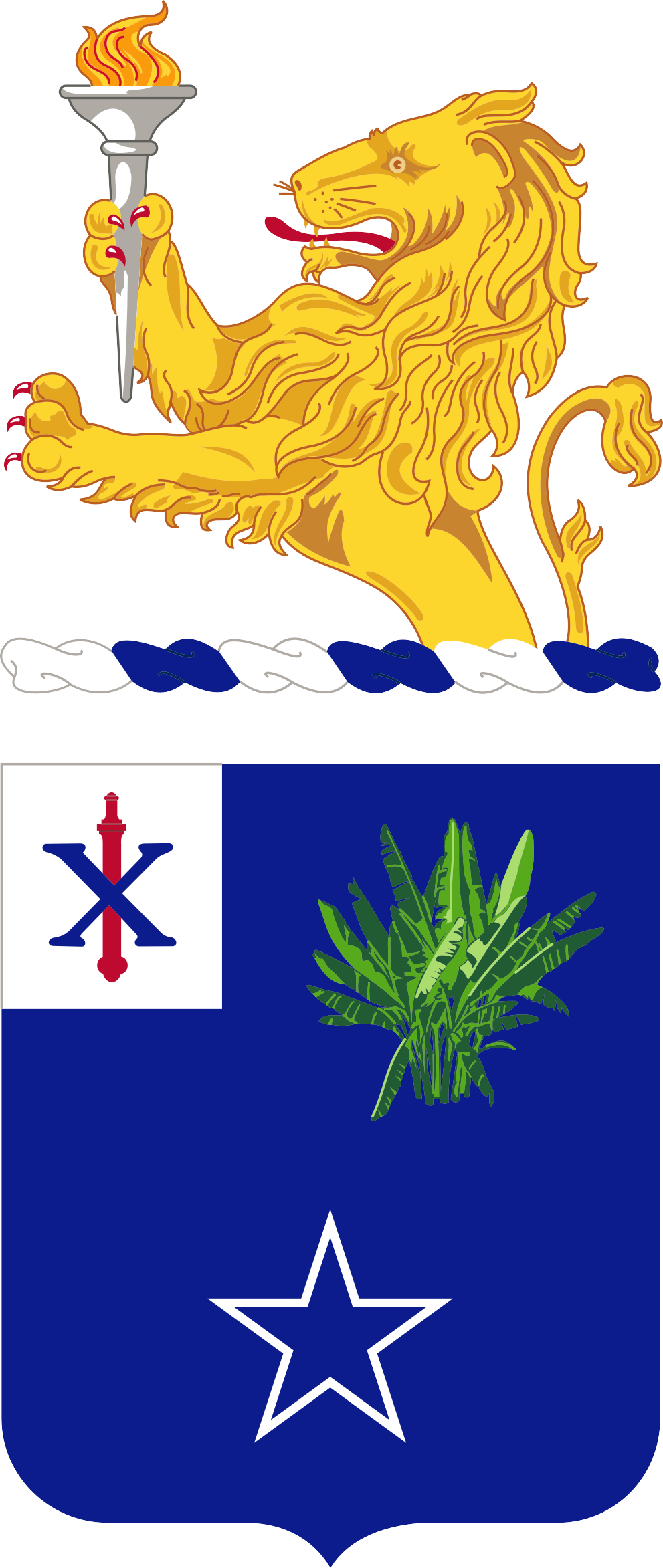
- Coat of arms
- Active: 1917-10 April 1942; 1946-1948
- Country: United States
- Branch: United States Army
- Type: Infantry
- Motto: "Strong to Endure"
- Engagements: World War II: Philippines campaign (1941–1942)

Commanders
- Notable commanders: Vicente Lim

Insignia
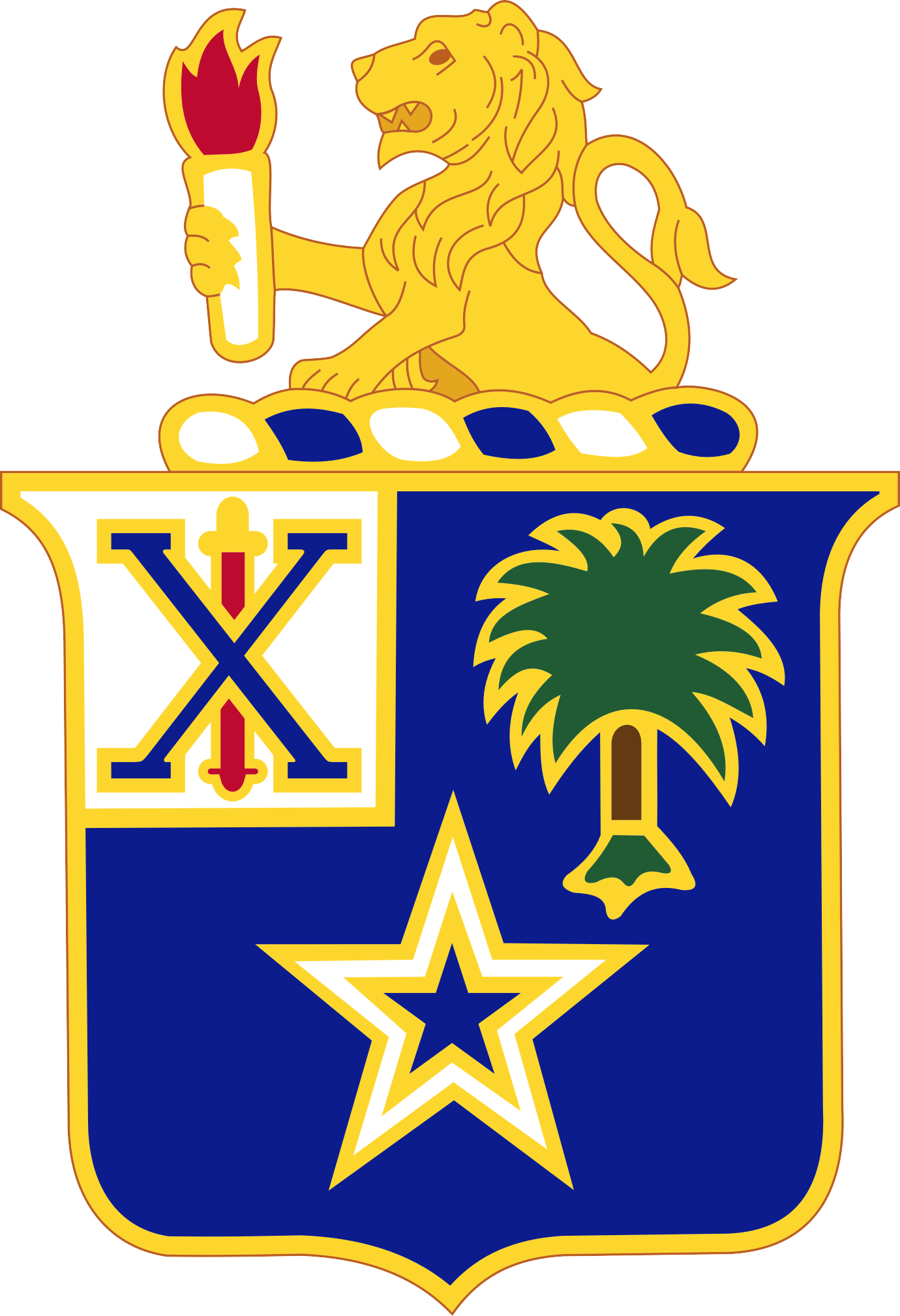
- Distinctive unit insignia

The 45th Infantry Regiment was a unit of the Philippine Scouts in the Philippine Division.

== History ==
The 45th, along with the 57th Infantry Regiment, were the first two infantry regiments of the Philippine Scouts which were formed after World War I.

The regiment was stationed at Camp Gordon, Georgia, as of June 1919 as a separate regiment, and was transferred on 4 September 1919 to Camp Dix, New Jersey. It was then transferred on 25 October 1920, less enlisted personnel and equipment, to Fort Mason, California, and sailed on 5 November 1920 to the Philippines with officer cadre, records, and colors, aboard the USAT Thomas. It arrived 2 December 1920 at Manila, and transferred to Fort William McKinley the following day, where it was reorganized as a Philippine Scout regiment by the assignment of the personnel and equipment of the inactivated 1st Philippine Infantry Regiment (Provisional). The 1st Battalion (minus Companies A and B) concurrently transferred to Camp John Hay, while Companies A and B transferred to Pettit Barracks. The regiment was assigned to the Philippine Division on 22 October 1921. The regiment was most well-known for its participation in the Battle of the Philippines (1941-42) during World War II and their eventual surrender to Japanese forces on 10 April 1942. In 1946, the regiment, less the 1st Battalion activated as the 77th Infantry, was reorganized as the 45th Infantry, but was inactivated in 1948 and disbanded on 10 October 1951.

== Distinctive unit insignia ==
- Description

A Gold color metal and enamel device 1 1/4 inches (3.2 cm) in height consisting of a shield blazoned: Azure in sinister chief an abaca tree (Manila hemp plant) Proper in base a mullet of the field fimbriated Argent, on a canton of the last the Roman numeral X of the first behind which paleways a Roman sword in sheath Gules (for the 10th Infantry). Attached above the shield from a wreath Argent and Azure a demi-lion Or grasping in his dexter paw a burning torch Argent, fire Proper.

- Symbolism

The Regiment was organized in 1917 at Fort Benjamin Harrison, Indiana, by transfer of personnel from the 10th Infantry. The shield is blue for the Infantry and the parentage of the Regiment is shown by the canton. The early station of the Regiment was the Philippines; this is indicated by the abaca tree which is a source of great wealth in the Islands and which grows native in no other place. The star in the base of the shield is the blue star of the old First Philippine Infantry. The crest of the Harrison family, General and President William Henry and General and President Benjamin Harrison, is a lion. This is also the upper body of the crest of the Philippines, a sea lion. The device of the State of Indiana is a torch. These are combined to form the crest of the Regiment.

- Background

The distinctive unit insignia was approved on 12 September 1923. It was rescinded on 19 August 1975.

== Coat of arms ==
- Blazon
  - Shield- Azure in sinister chief an abaca tree (Manila hemp plant) Proper in base a mullet of the field fimbriated Argent, on a canton of the last the Roman numeral X of the first behind which paleways a Roman sword in sheath Gules (for the 10th Infantry).
  - Crest- From a wreath Argent and Azure a demi-lion Or grasping in his dexter paw a burning torch Argent, fire Proper.
  - Motto STRONG TO ENDURE.
- Symbolism
  - Shield- The Regiment was organized in 1917 at Fort Benjamin Harrison, Indiana, by transfer of personnel from the 10th Infantry. The shield is blue for the Infantry and the parentage of the Regiment is shown by the canton. The early station of the Regiment was the Philippines; this is indicated by the abaca tree which is a source of great wealth in the Islands and which grows native in no other place. The star in the base of the shield is the blue star of the old First Philippine Infantry.
  - Crest- The crest of the Harrison family, General and President William Henry and General and President Benjamin Harrison, is a lion. This is also the upper body of the crest of the Philippines, a sea lion. The device of the State of Indiana is a torch. These are combined to form the crest of the Regiment.
- Background- The coat of arms was approved on 10 April 1922. It was rescinded on 19 August 1975.

== See also ==
- Military History of the Philippines
