= 57th Infantry Regiment (United States) =

57th Infantry Regiment (PS)
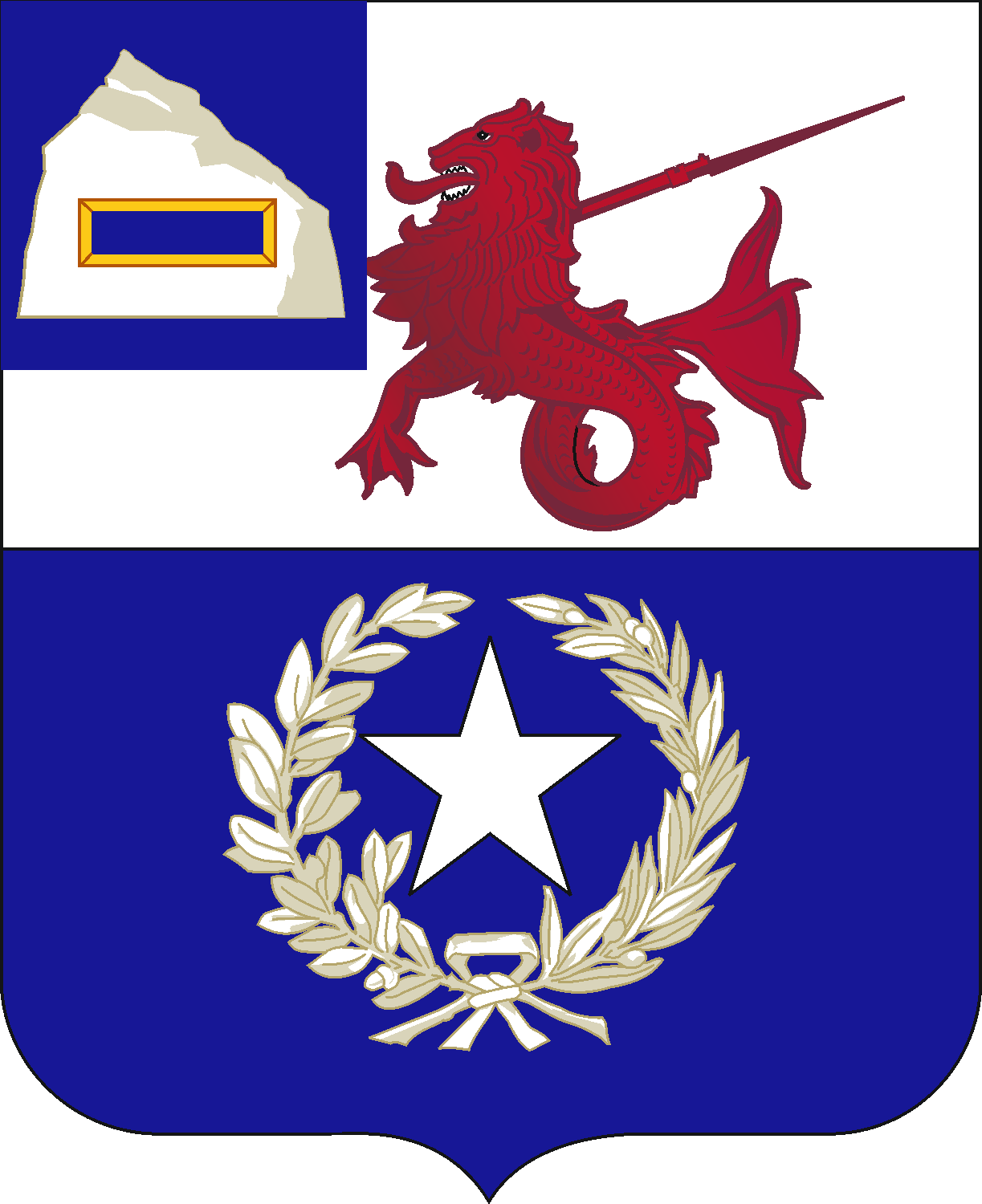
- Coat of arms
- Active: 1917-45
- Country: United States - Philippines
- Branch: United States Army
- Type: Infantry
- Mottos: Anywhere, Anytime
- Mascot: Sea lion
- Engagements: World War II

Commanders
- Notable commanders: Lloyd Fredendall; James Garesche Ord; George S. Clarke; Arnold J. Funk

Insignia
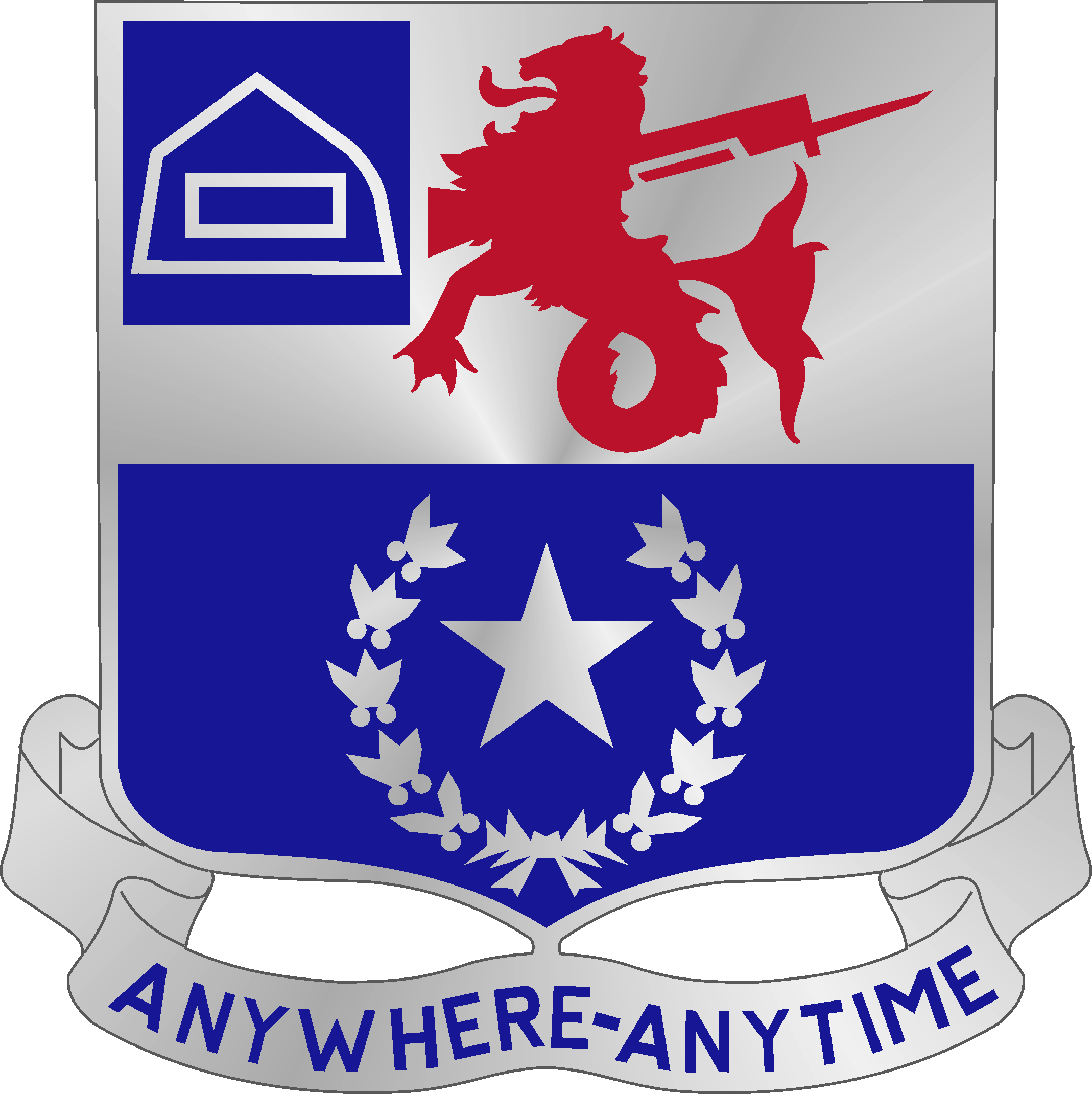
- Distinctive unit insignia

The 57th Infantry Regiment was a unit in the Philippine Scouts. During their combat in Bataan members received 1 Medal of Honor, 21 Distinguished Service Crosses and 68 Silver Stars.

== History ==
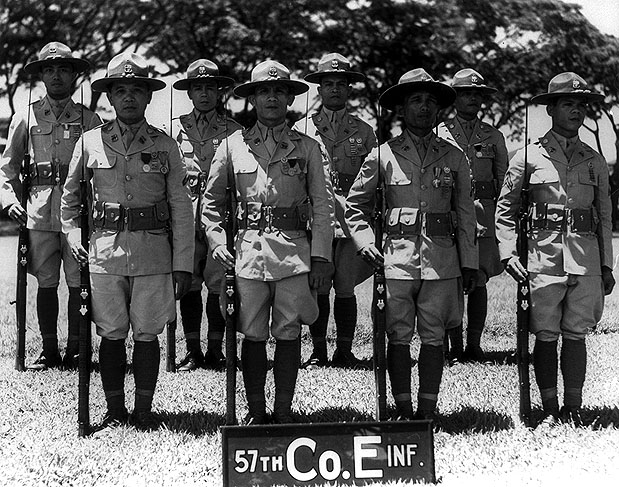
Soldiers of the regiment's Company E in 1938.

The 57th was formed in 1917 and transferred to the Philippines in 1921 and was one of the original units of the Philippine Division.

== Lineage ==
Constituted 15 May 1917 in the regular Army as the 57th infantry. Organized 1 June 1917 at Camp Wilson, Texas from personnel of the 19th infantry. Assigned to the 15th Infantry Division 31 July 1918. Relieved from the 15th Division 18 May 1919. Transferred, without personnel, to the Philippine Department and consolidated with 2nd Philippine Infantry (Provisional)(Organized 5 April 1918 from the 4th, 10th, and 15th Battalions, and the 72nd 73rd, 74th, and 75th Companies, Philippine Scouts) and redesignated 57th infantry (Philippine Scouts) 2 December 1920.

Assigned to the Philippine Division 22 October 1921. Surrendered with the Luzon Force to the Japanese 14th Army in the Philippine islands 9 April 1942.

Reorganized 6 April 1946 in the Philippine islands and 1st Battalion expanded and redesignated 78th Infantry (Philippine Scouts); Concurrently new 1st Battalion constituted and organized. Inactivated 1 June 1949 in the Philippine islands. Disbanded 10 October 1951.

== Distinctive unit insignia ==
- Description

A Silver color metal and enamel device 1 1/4 inches (3.2 cm) in height consisting of a shield blazoned: Parti per fess Argent and Azure, in chief a sea lion holding in dexter paw a musket with bayonet Gules, in base a mullet within a wreath both of the first; on a canton of the second a rock of the first charged with a shoulder strap of a second lieutenant of Infantry of 1863 Proper. Attached below and to the sides of the shield a Silver scroll inscribed "ANYWHERE-ANYTIME" in Blue letters.

- Symbolism

The Regiment was organized in 1917 at Fort Sam Houston by transfer of men from the 19th. The shield is of the Infantry colors with the station of the Regiment indicated by the sea lion of the Philippines holding the musket in the upper portion of the shield and the device of Texas, the star and wreath, in the lower part denoting the place of birth. The parentage of the Regiment is shown in the canton which displays the crest of the 19th United States Infantry. The 19th was a portion of General George H. Thomas’ command at Chickamauga in 1863. At the end of the second day (20 September) the entire Federal line had given way excepting Thomas. The 19th held but it had been so roughly used, four officers and 51 men fit for duty, that at sundown the remains of the entire Regiment was in command of a Second Lieutenant. This is shown by the rock and the shoulder strap.

- Background

The distinctive unit insignia was approved on 24 March 1924. It was rescinded/cancelled on 4 March 1976.

== Coat of arms ==
Blazon

- Shield- Parti per fess Argent and Azure, in chief a sea lion holding in dexter paw a musket with bayonet Gules, in base a mullet within a wreath both of the first; on a canton of the second a rock of the first charged with a shoulder strap of a second lieutenant of Infantry of 1863 Proper.
- Crest- None.
- Motto- ANYWHERE ANYTIME.

Symbolism

- Shield- The Regiment was organized in 1917 at Fort Sam Houston by transfer of men from the 19th. The shield is of the Infantry colors with the station of the Regiment indicated by the sea lion of the Philippines holding the musket in the upper portion of the shield and the device of Texas, the star and wreath, in the lower part denoting the place of birth. The parentage of the Regiment is shown in the canton which displays the crest of the 19th United States Infantry. The 19th was a portion of General George H. Thomas’ command at Chickamauga in 1863. At the end of the second day (20 September) the entire Federal line had given way excepting Thomas. The 19th held but it had been so roughly used, four officers and 51 men fit for duty, that at sundown the remains of the entire Regiment was in command of a Second Lieutenant. This is shown by the rock and the shoulder strap.
- Crest- None.

Background- The coat of arms was approved on 5 June 1922. It was rescinded/cancelled on 4 March 1976.

== Honors ==
=== Campaign participation credit ===
Conflict	Streamer	Period
Philippine–American War	Luzon 1901	1901
Philippine–American War	Luzon 1902	1902
World War II	Philippine Islands	7 Dec 41 - 10 May 42
World War II	World War II Victory	service between 7 December 1941 and 31 December 1946

=== Decorations ===
Ribbon	Award	Embroidered	Orders
	Presidential Unit Citation	LUZON 1941-1942	WD GO 14, 1942
	Presidential Unit Citation	BATAAN	WD GO 32, 1942
	Presidential Unit Citation	DEFENSE OF THE PHILIPPINES	WD GO 22, 1942 as amended by DA GO 46, 1948
	Philippine Presidential Unit Citation	7 DECEMBER 1941 TO 10 MAY 1942	DA GO 47, 1950

== See also ==
- John E. Olson - Regimental S-1
- Harold K. Johnson - Regimental S-3
- Royal Reynolds Jr. - Battalion Commander
- George S. Clarke - Regimental Commander
- Alexander R. Nininger - Medal of Honor Recipient.
- Arthur W. Wermuth - Distinguished Service Cross recipient dubbed "One man army of Bataan"
- Teofilo Ildefonso - 2-time Olympic swimming bronze medalist.
- Albert Jones - became a General officer and commanded 51st Division and I Philippine Corps.
