= List of memorials to Bataan Death March victims =

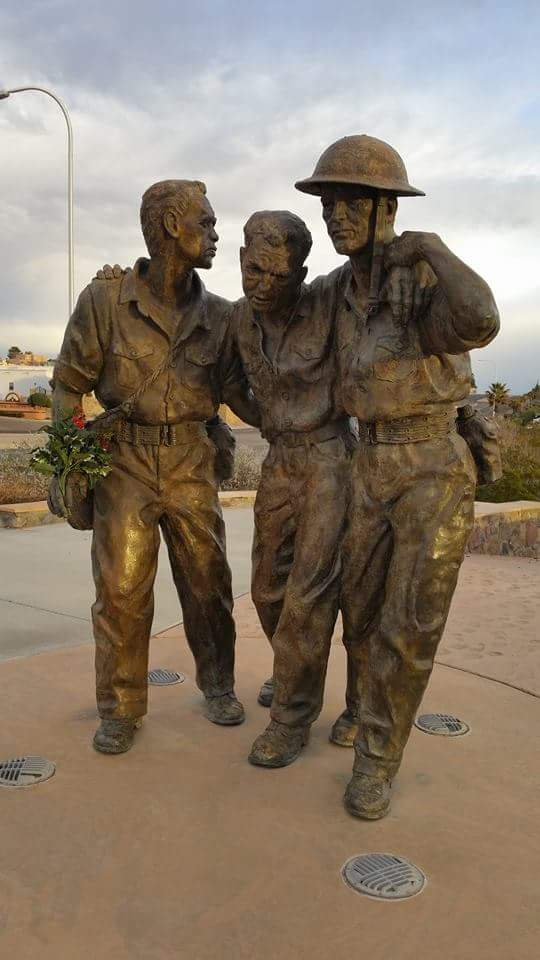
Bataan Death March memorial in Las Cruces Veterans Memorial Park

Across the United States, and in the Philippines there exist dozens of memorials, such as monuments, plaques and schools, dedicated to the U.S. and Filipino prisoners who suffered or died during the Bataan Death March. There is also a wide variety of commemorative events held to honor the victims, include holidays, athletic events such as marathons, and memorial ceremonies held at military cemeteries.

== Memorials ==
=== Philippines ===
- In Capas, Tarlac, there is the Capas National Shrine built in the grounds surrounding Camp O'Donnell.
- There is also a shrine in Bataan on Mount Samat named Dambana ng Kagitingan ("Shrine of Valour") commemorating the battle and the march. The shrine has a colonnade that houses an altar, esplanade, and a museum. There is also a Memorial Cross built towering 92 m (302 ft) in height
- The Battling Bastards of Bataan Memorial commemorating all the Americans who died on the death march and at Camp O'Donnell during the war. Located at Camp O'Donnell, Capas, Tarlac, Philippines.
- Alongside modern roads that follow the march route up the Bataan peninsula, there are memorial markers labeled with "Death March" and a depiction of three soldiers with the km number for that location along the route (distance from origin of the march at south end of Bataan).
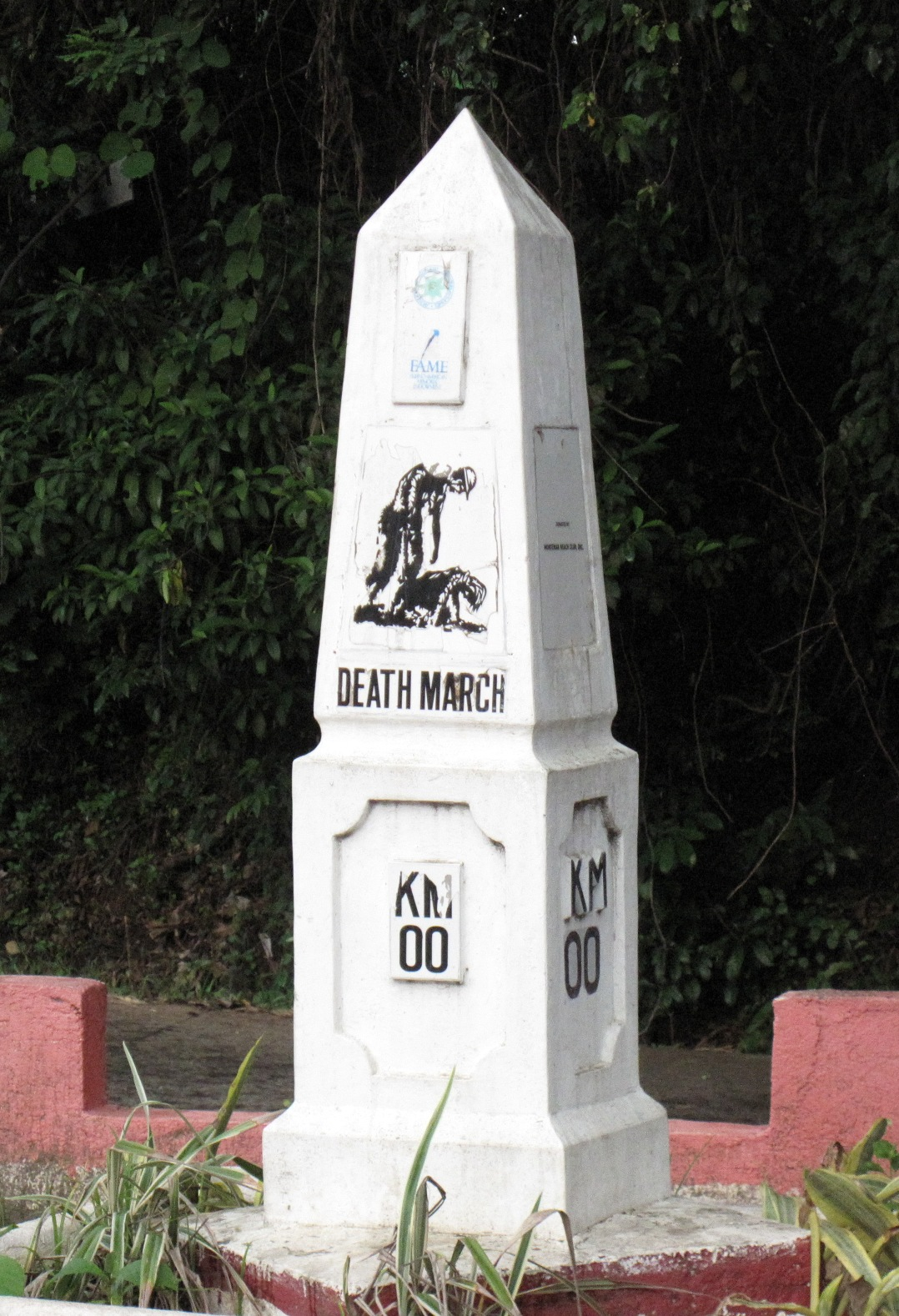
Bataan Death March memorial kilometer zero marker in Mariveles

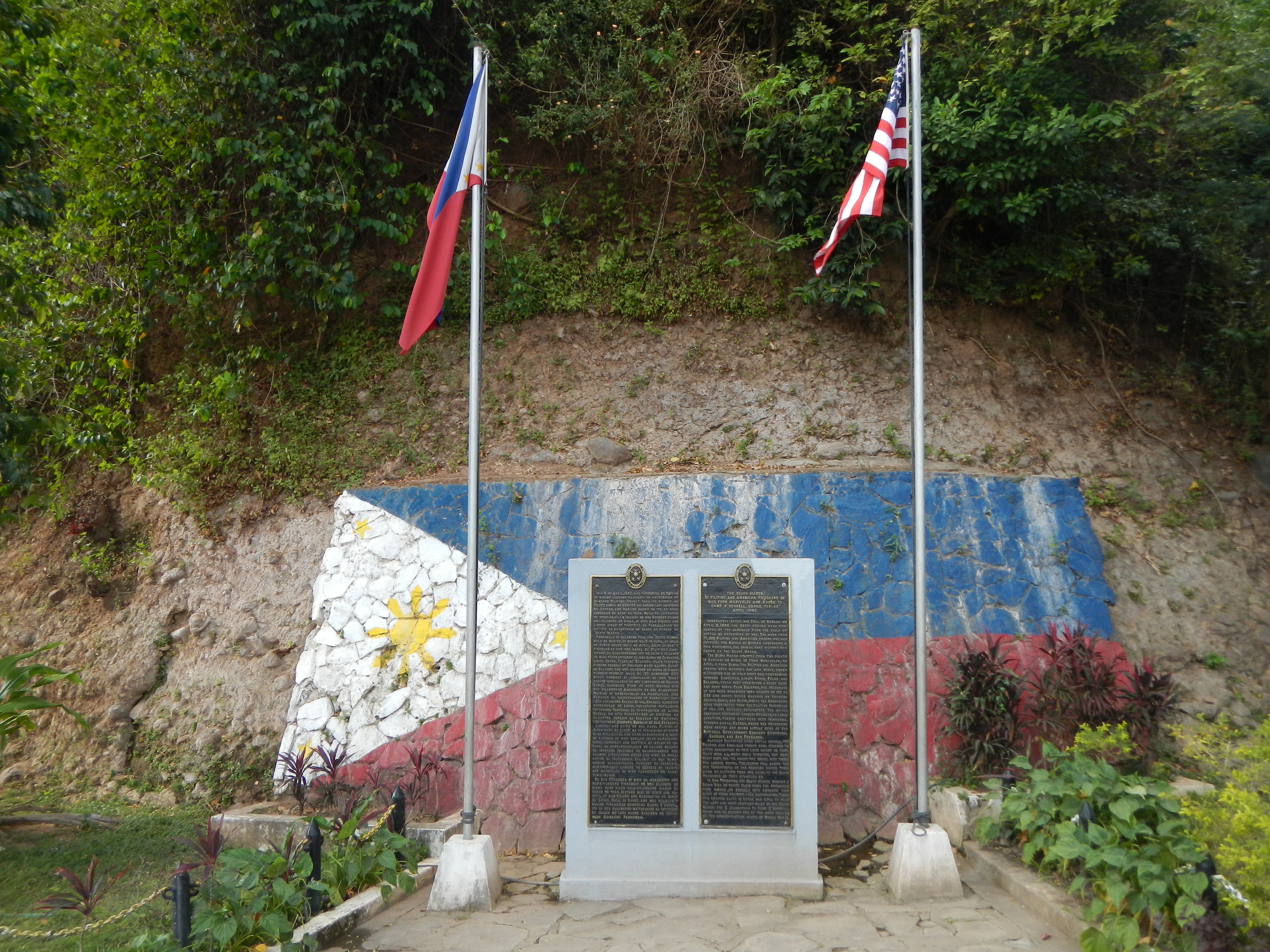
Monument to the Fall of Bataan and consequent Death March in Mariveles

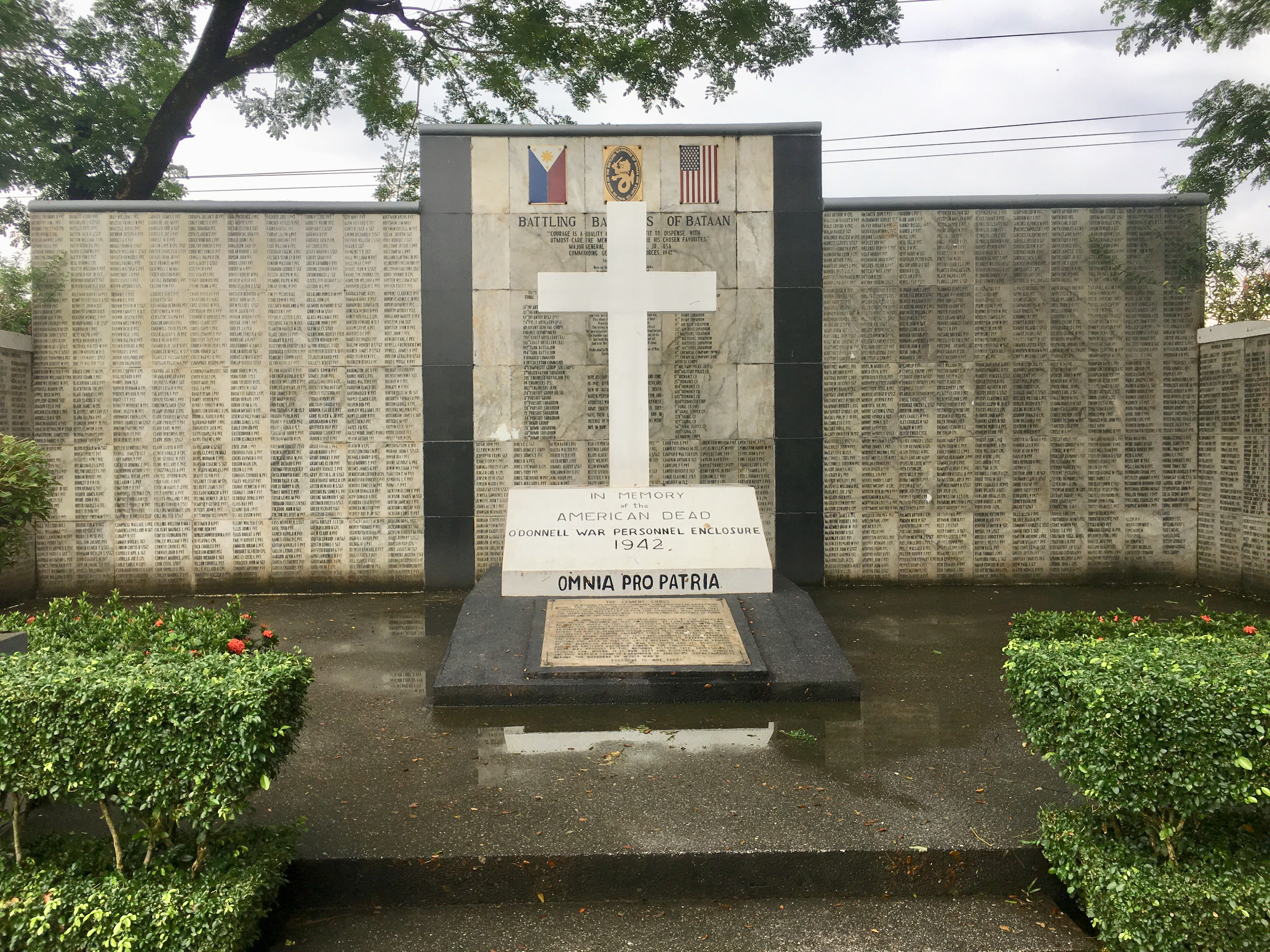
Omnia Pro Patria in Capas National Shrine

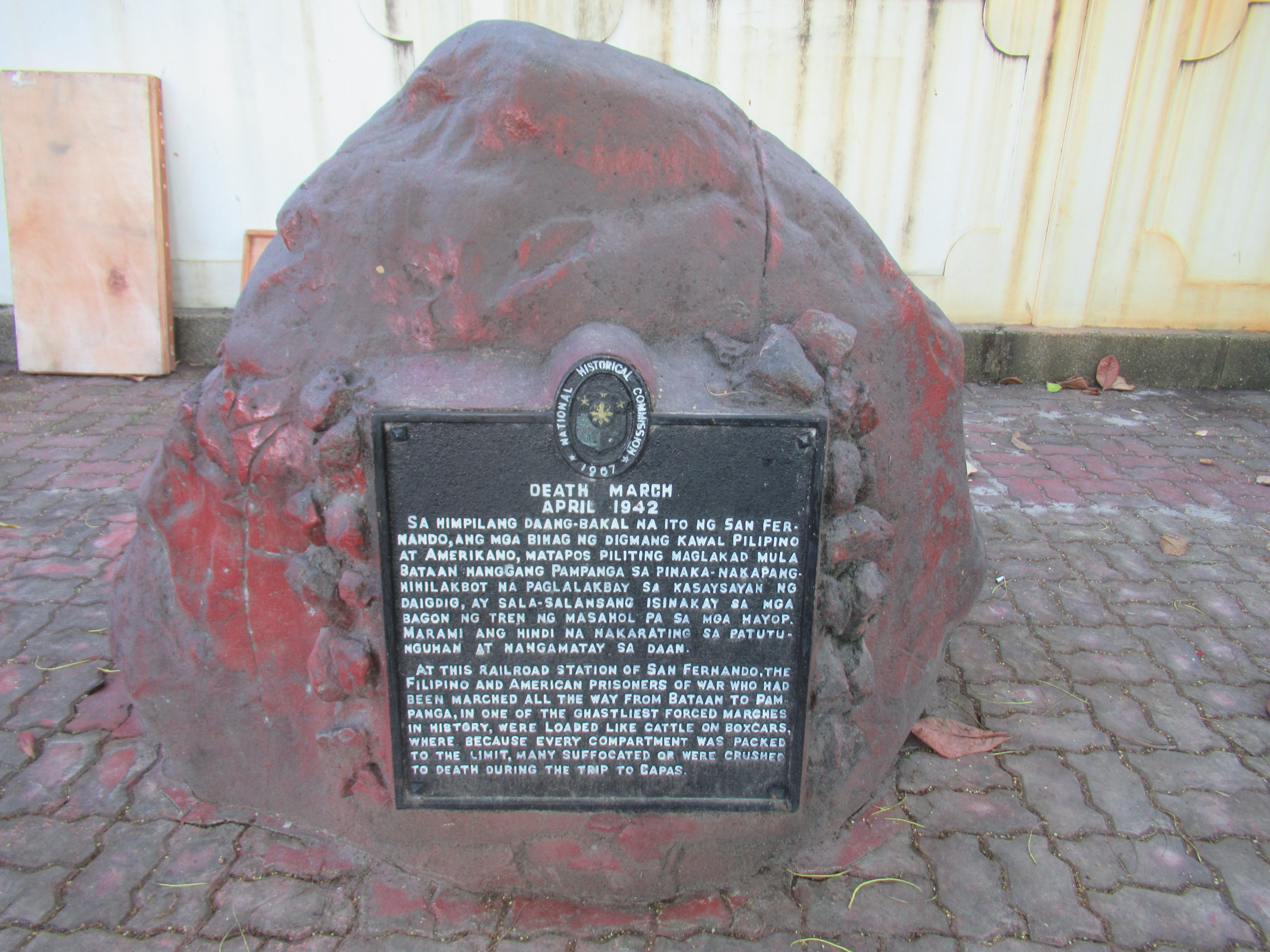
San Fernando station (Pampanga)

=== United States ===
- Bataan Memorial Park in Albuquerque, New Mexico memorializes the veterans of the 200th Coast Artillery (United States) and 515th CA regiments. The park was dedicated in 1943, a monument was added in 1960, and major additions were completed in 2002. Rows of granite slabs are etched with the history of the units and the names of those who served. Each year fewer survivors meet to remember their ordeal.
- Plaque erected by the American Defenders of Bataan and Corregidor, Inc. in Piedmont Park, in Atlanta, Georgia.
- The Bataan Bridge in Carlsbad, New Mexico commemorates the victims of the march.
- Highway-70, through Southern New Mexico was renamed the Bataan Memorial Highway.
- Statue of American and Filipino Bataan survivors resides at Veterans Memorial Park, in Las Cruces, New Mexico
- Bataan Memorial Building—Santa Fe, New Mexico. The building is named in memoriam for the many New Mexico veterans serving in the 200th Coast Artillery (Regiment) during World War II. The building served as the State Capitol Building from 1900 to 1966.
- Bataan Memorial Trainway in El Paso, Texas honors the prisoners-of-war who died in the enemy camp
- The Bataan–Corregidor Memorial Bridge in Chicago, Illinois, where State Street crosses the Chicago River, commemorates the defenders of Bataan and Corregidor as well as those on the march.
- The Bataan Memorial Highway in Indiana, SR 38 from Richmond, Indiana to Lafayette, Indiana.
- A statue, at the corner of Milwaukee St. and Franklin St. in Janesville, Wisconsin, commemorates Company A of the 192nd Tank Battalion
- The "A Tribute To Courage" Memorial in Kissimmee, Florida, at the corner of Lakeshore Boulevard and Monument Avenue. It depicts a scene from the Bataan Death March: two soldiers, one American and the other Filipino, are propping each other up while a Filipino woman is offering water to them. It symbolizes the unique friendship between the U.S. and the Philippines—the two countries fought together during World War II, and the heroism and comradeship between the Americans and Filipinos. It was sculpted by Sandra Storm and is made of bronze. A brick walkway encircles the monument and there are commemorative plaques depicting the history of the Bataan Death March and the Memorial. American and Filipino flags fly side by side. It is the only statue in the U.S. dedicated to the heroes and survivors of the fall of Bataan and Corregidor and the Bataan Death March .
- Bataan Elementary School in Port Clinton, Ohio commemorates the 32 men from the Port Clinton area who were victims of the march.
- Bataan Death March Memorial Park in Spokane, Washington
- Bataan and Corregidor Streets next to Scott Circle in Washington, D.C., adjacent to the Embassy of the Philippines
- Camp San Luis Obispo Bataan Memorial in San Luis Obispo, California.
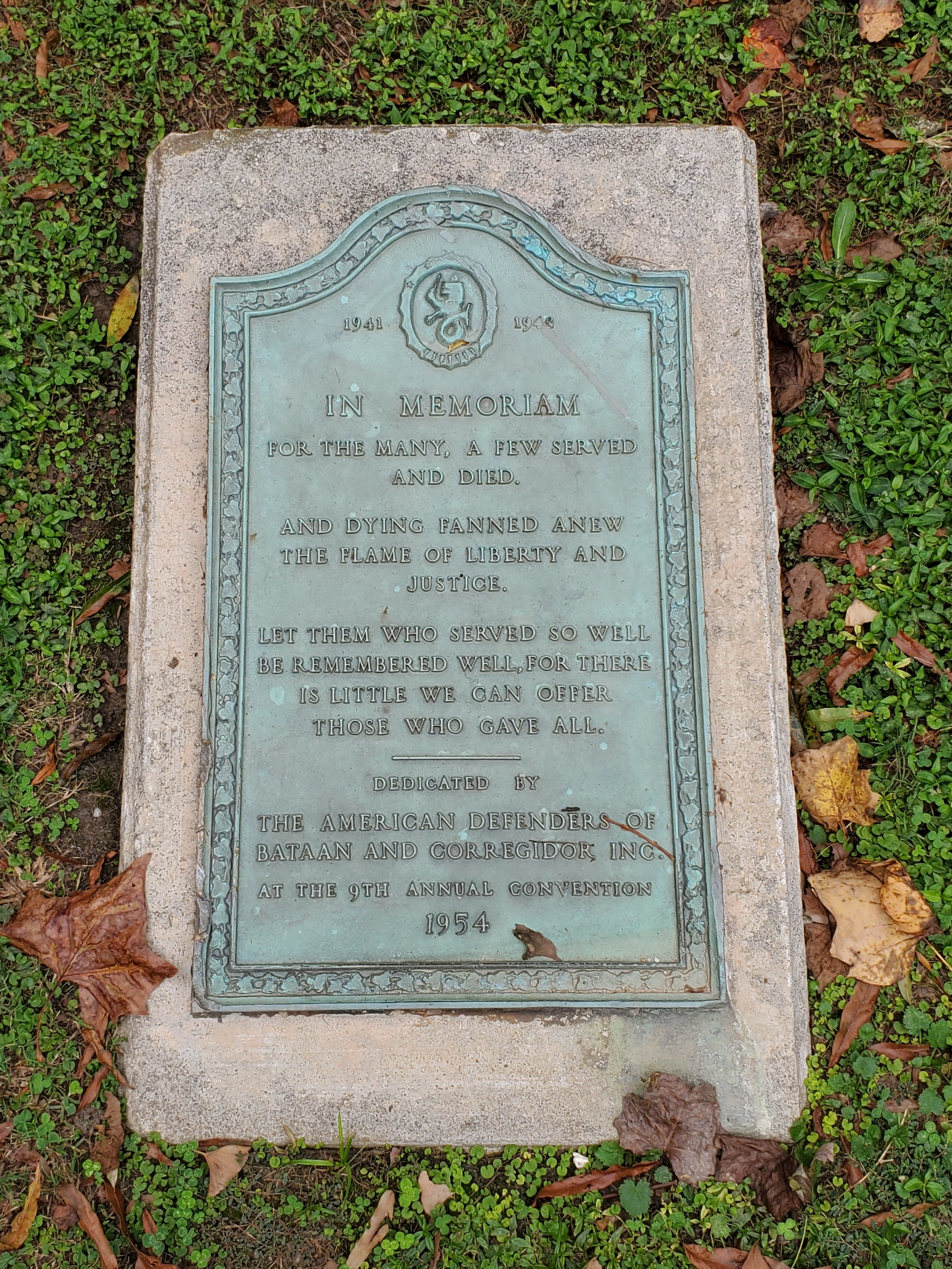
Plaque in Piedmont Park, Atlanta, Georgia.

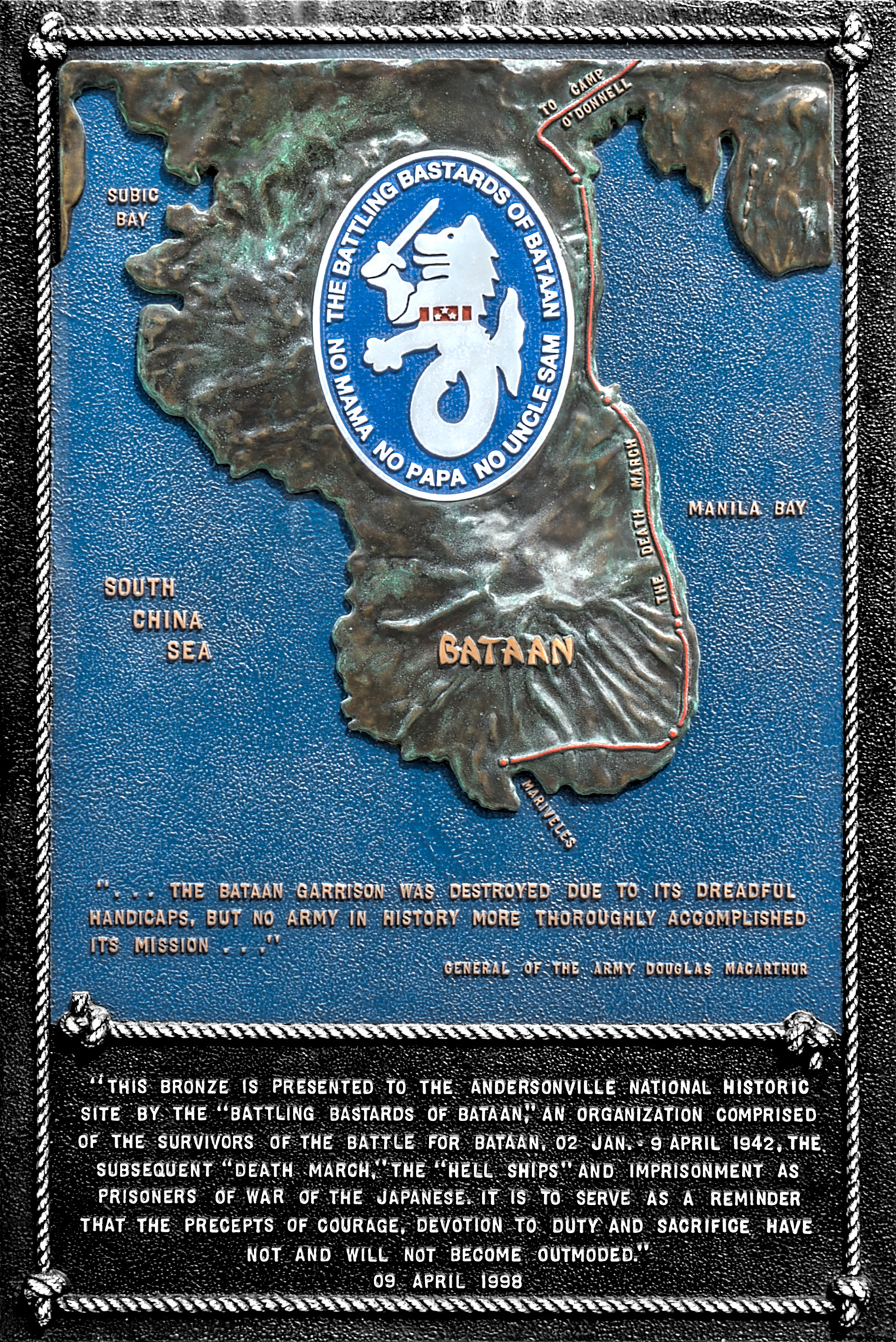
Plaque at Andersonville National Historic Site

== Commemorative Events ==
=== The Philippines ===
Every year on April 9, the captured soldiers are honored on Araw ng Kagitingan ("Day of Valour"), also known as the "Bataan Day", which is a national holiday in the Philippines. Beginning in 1962, the Boy Scouts of America Far East Council troops from Clark Air Base, Subic Bay and Sangley Naval Stations would join with Boy Scouts of the Philippines troops to reenact this march along the initial route in Bataan taken by the Prisoners of War, who were American and Filipino soldiers, sailors, airmen, and civilians. The original Death March was approximately 100 km (62 mi) in length, depending upon where in Bataan the POWs started.

=== Honolulu, Hawaii, USA ===
The Sacrifices of the Fall of Bataan and Corregidor are commemorated at the National Memorial Cemetery of the Pacific at Punchbowl, Honolulu, Hawaii every year. On April 9, 2009, Philippines Secretary of National Defense, Hon. Gilberto C. Teodoro gave the "Araw ng Kagitingan Address" (Day of Valor Address) and led in a wreath laying ceremony, attended by US Senators Daniel Inouye and Daniel Akaka, Filipino World War II veterans, Hawaii government officials, members of the Consular Corps, the U.S. Pacific Command and the Filipino-American community in Honolulu. The Philippine Consul General in Honolulu, Hon. Ariel Y. Abadilla, organized the ceremony.

=== White Sands Missile Range, New Mexico, USA ===
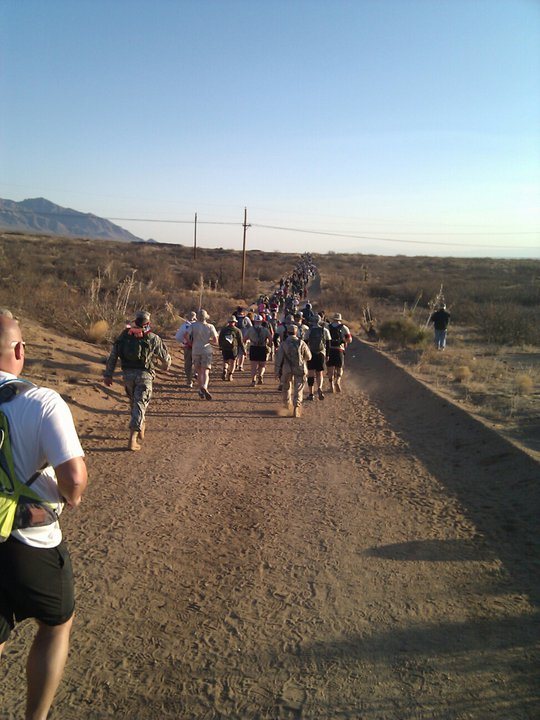
Marathoners along the course of the Bataan Memorial Death March Marathon at WSMR

The Bataan Death March is commemorated every year in March since 1993 at the White Sands Missile Range, northeast of Las Cruces, New Mexico, with a trail marathon known as the Bataan Memorial Death March. The full marathon and 15 mi (24 km) run covers paved road and sandy trails, and is regarded by Marathon Guide as one of the top 30 marathons in the U.S.

Over 6,300 marchers (2011) participate in both the marathon and the 15.4 mi (24.8 km) run (only the marathon is timed), with members of military units of the U.S. and foreign armed forces participating. Many civilians also participate, usually running in the full marathon, which is timed with awards (but not certified by USA Track and Field). Several of the few surviving Bataan prisoners usually await the competitors to congratulate them on completing the grueling march.

=== Minnesota, USA ===
Company A, 194th Armored Regiment, was deployed to the Philippines in autumn, 1941. To commemorate the military and civilian prisoners who were forced to march from Bataan to Camp O’Donnell, an annual Bataan Memorial March is organized by the 194th Armor Regiment of the Minnesota Army National Guard and held at Brainerd, MN. The march is open to anyone with both 10- and 20-mile distances. The march has different categories, consisting of teams, individuals, light pack, or a heavy pack. A closing ceremony is held to award the finishers and pay tribute to the survivors and their many comrades who perished on the death march.

=== Chesapeake, Virginia, USA ===
The City of Chesapeake hosts an annual march commemorating the Bataan Death March at the Great Dismal Swamp state park. Sailors and Marines from the USS Bataan, a Wasp class aircraft carrier home ported in nearby Norfolk, participate and volunteer in this commemorative event.

=== Maywood, Illinois, USA ===
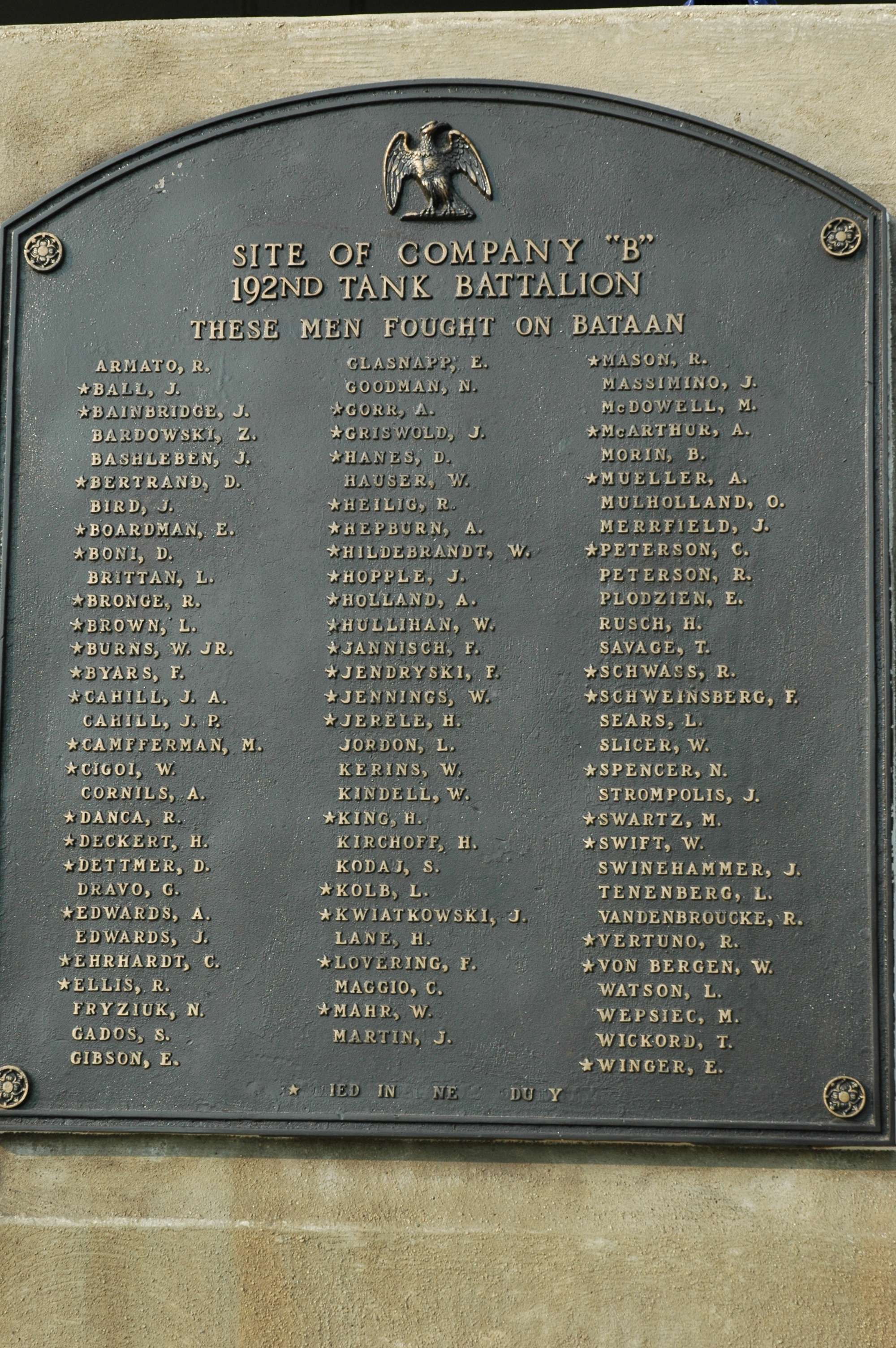
Plaque in Maywood, Illinois

Since 1942, this small western suburb of Chicago has marked the second Sunday in September as "Maywood Bataan Day." The residents were then calling attention to the over 100 Maywood National Guard troops who were taken prisoner when American forces surrendered at Bataan on April 9, 1942. These men endured the death march, prison camps, "Hell ships," and eventual slave labour in Japan itself. The men were part of Company B, 192nd Tank Battalion. The original Maywood Bataan Day drew more than 100,000 spectators, dozens of marching bands, and celebrities including the Mayor Ed Kelley of Chicago and movie and radio stars. Today's celebration is much smaller, but still draws several hundred. The memorial is supported by the village of Maywood, Illinois and a non-profit group, the Maywood Bataan Day Organization that had in 1999 the local park dedicated as the Veterans Memorial Park. Ironically, the Memorial Park in Maywood is bordered by commuter rail track that now runs trains by Nippon Sharyo, a Japanese rail car manufacturer that used Maywood POWs as wartime slave labor.

=== American Defenders of Bataan and Corregidor Veterans Association ===
Veterans of the death march held regularly scheduled conventions after World War II. The last convention, attended by 73 survivors from the march, was held on May 29, 2009, in San Antonio, Texas. At the convention, Japanese ambassador to the U.S. Ichiro Fujisaki apologized to the assembled attendees for his country "having caused tremendous damage and suffering to many people, including prisoners of war, those who have undergone tragic experiences."

=== Bataan Legacy Historical Society (BLHS) ===
Bataan Legacy Historical Society was created as a response to the lack of information on the Filipino defenders of Bataan. Bataan Legacy Historical Society continues to collaborate with organizations across the United States and the Philippines so that World War II in the Philippines can be learned by generations to come. To facilitate learning, lesson plans can be downloaded from the organization's website. The first Bataan Legacy presentation took place on April 9, 2012, during the 70th Anniversary of the Fall of Bataan. Since 2016 BLHS—in collaboration with Memorare Manila 1945, the Philippine Consulate General and the San Francisco Main Public Library—has hosted an annual conference in San Francisco, California. Speakers from the Philippines and across the United States gathered together to educate the public about the Filipino and American soldiers and civilians who suffered and sacrificed so much during WWII.

- 2019 Conference
- 2018 Conference
- 2017 Conference
- 2016 Conference

== Documentary film ==
In 2012 film producer Jan Thompson created a film documentary on the Death March, POW camps, and Japanese hell ships titled Never the Same: The Prisoner-of-War Experience. The film reproduced scenes of the camps and ships, showed drawings and writings of the prisoners, and featured Loretta Swit as the narrator.
