= Salvador A. Rodolfo Sr. =

Colonel Salvador Arambulo Rodolfo Sr. (7 February 1919 – 9 January 2012) was a Filipino soldier who helped liberate the Island Province of Catanduanes in the Philippines from the Japanese Imperial Army during World War II. He was known in Catanduanes as "Phantom" or the "Man who Never Dies", based on the comic book hero created by Lee Falk in 1936.

He organized the Catanduanes Liberation Forces (CLF), the guerilla unit that paved the way for the liberation of Catanduanes in 1945. As a result, Japanese forces were defeated before the American forces arrived in Catanduanes in 1945.

== Personal life ==
Rodolfo was born in 1919 in Bato, Catanduanes, Philippines. He was a descendant of Don Juan Rodolfo of Almeria, Spain who went to the Philippines in the 18th century and married the daughter of Datu Bantog, who was then one of the Tribal Chieftains in Catanduanes, in order to put to a halt the hostilities between the natives and the Spaniards. The Rodolfos played an important role in Catanduanes politics in the Spanish Colonial Period. His father, Roman Rodolfo, was an undefeated Mayor of Bato, and his mother, Maria Tan Arambulo, was a Chinese businesswoman.

== World War II ==
When the Second World War broke out, Rodolfo was called to arms in defense of the Philippines against the invading Japanese Imperial Forces. He fought in the three-month Battle of Bataan in 1942, and was a survivor of the Bataan Death March. While in Camp O’Donnel in Capas, Tarlac, he met the then Lt. Ferdinand E. Marcos, who would later on become President of the Philippines. He was released later. After being released from the camp in Capas, Rodolfo organized the Catanduanes Liberation Forces.

== Catanduanes Liberation Forces ==
The Catanduanes Liberation Forces headed and organized by Rodolfo was the resistance movement in Catanduanes. During this time, Rodolfo was rumored several times to have been killed in battle but returned to fight in Catanduanes, hence he was called “Phantom” or the Man who never dies.

== Liberation ==
On February 8, 1945, when Rodolfo was about to declare the independence of the province after he and his men killed every Japanese Imperial Army and burned every Japanese garrison in Catanduanes, one of his men approached him and said that there were Japanese reinforcements on board 2 vessels approaching the island. He then talked to his men, most of whom were wounded and exhausted, he said:

Japanese reinforcements are coming. I have two options for you, we can go to the hills and save ourselves and wait there until the Americans arrive, but I assure you that all civilians left behind will be massacred by the incoming Japanese, or we can repeat what happened in the Battle of Thermopylae and stand our ground. Most of us will die, but we will live forever in the pages of history as the men who fought for the liberation of Catanduanes

With that, everybody decided to stand their ground and fight the incoming Japanese. They went to their posts to wait for the enemy’s arrival but then, as if by providence, American planes arrived and bombed the Japanese vessels. Rodolfo declared independence of the entire province on February 8, 1945.

== Later life and death ==
Rodolfo played a role in local politics in the 1980s and 1990s, serving as Senior Provincial Board Member of the Sangguniang Panlalawigan and acting Vice Governor in Catanduanes. He was a key ally of the late Gov. Leandro Verceles Sr., ultimately bringing an end to the political dynasty in the province.

In 1995, he was appointed as Chief Security Consultant in the Bureau of Immigration under then Commissioner Leandro Verceles during Pres. Fidel V. Ramos Administration.

He was granted US Citizenship in 1992 after the US Congress passed the law granting citizenship to the USAFFE Veterans who served under Gen. Douglas MacArthur. He decided to stay in America for good in 2002.

He died on January 9, 2012, at Los Robles Hospital in Thousand Oaks, California. He was a month away from his 93rd birthday.

He is buried at the Garden of Valor in Valley Oaks-Griffin Memorial Park in Westlake Village, California.
