= Masanobu Tsuji =

Japanese officer in WWII, war criminal

- 辻 政信
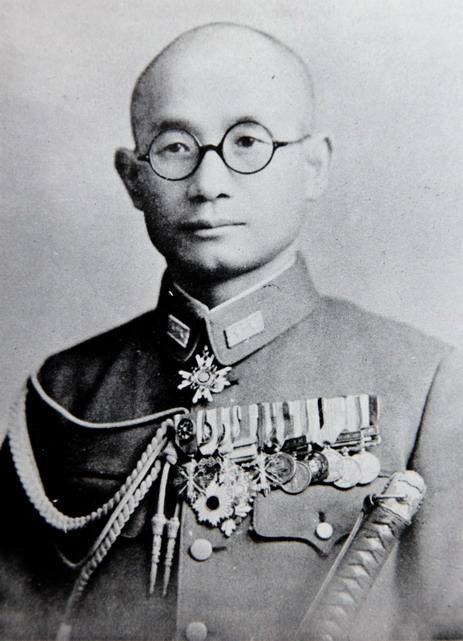
- Tsuji in 1943

Member of the House of Councillors
- In office 2 June 1959 – 1 June 1965^{[a]}
- Constituency: National district

Member of the House of Representatives
- In office 2 October 1952 – 30 April 1959
- Preceded by: Ryōichi Oka
- Succeeded by: Shigeo Imura
- Constituency: Ishikawa 1st

Personal details
- Born: 11 October 1902 Enuma, Ishikawa, Japan
- Party: Independent
- Other political affiliations: LP (1950–1955); LDP (1955–1959)
- Relatives: Mitsuo Horiuchi (son-in-law)
- Education: Army War College
- Nickname: God of Strategy

Military service
- Allegiance: Empire of Japan
- Branch/service: Imperial Japanese Army
- Years of service: 1924–1945
- Rank: Colonel
- Battles/wars: Second Sino–Japanese War; Soviet–Japanese Border War; World War II
- Disappeared: April 1961 (aged 58); Plain of Jars, Laos
- Status: Declared dead in absentia 20 July 1968 (aged 65)
- a. As he wasn't declared dead at the time, he officially remained a member of the House of Councillors until the end of his term.

Masanobu Tsuji (辻 政信, Tsuji Masanobu; 11 October 1902 – disappeared c. 1961) was a Japanese army officer, politician, and war criminal. During World War II, he was an important tactical planner in the Imperial Japanese Army and developed the detailed plans for the successful Japanese invasion of Malaya at the start of the war. He also helped plan and lead the final Japanese offensive during the Guadalcanal campaign.

A Pan-Asianist, Tsuji pressured Asian countries to support Japan in World War II, despite being involved in atrocities such as the Bataan Death March and Sook Ching mass killings. He meticulously planned the mass murders in Singapore and surrounding regions, personally overseeing the Pantingan River massacre. He also once cannibalized a downed Allied airman. Tsuji evaded prosecution for Japanese war crimes at the end of the war and hid in Thailand. He returned to Japan in 1949 and was elected to the Diet as an advocate of renewed militarism. Through the 1950s he worked for American intelligence alongside Takushiro Hattori. In 1961, he disappeared on a trip to Laos.

Tsuji was among the most aggressive and influential Japanese militarists. He was a leading proponent of the concept of gekokujō, (literally "the bottom overthrowing the top") by acting without or contrary to authorization. He incited the 1939 border clash with the Soviet Union and was a vehement advocate of war against the United States. According to historian John W. Dower, Tsuji was a "fanatical ideologue and pathologically brutal staff officer".

== Early life and career ==
Masanobu Tsuji was born in Ishikawa Prefecture, Japan. He received his secondary education at a military academy and later graduated from the War College.

By 1934, he was active in the Army's political intrigues as a member of the Tōseiha ("Control Faction") and helped block the attempted coup d'état of the rival Kōdōha ("Imperial Way Faction"). That brought him the patronage of General and future Prime Minister Hideki Tojo and General and future War Minister Seishirō Itagaki.

== Atrocities and war crimes ==
From 1938 to 1939, Tsuji was a staff officer in the Kwantung Army in Japanese-occupied Mongolia. In March 1939, after the Japanese defeat at the hands of the Soviets at Changkufeng, Tsuji instigated an aggressive border policy, which triggered the Nomonhan Incident.

When the war against America and Britain started, Tsuji was on the staff of General Tomoyuki Yamashita, whose army invaded Malaya. He was largely responsible for planning Yamashita's successful landing in Malaya and subsequent campaign against Singapore. After the capture of Singapore, Tsuji helped plan the Sook Ching, a systematic massacre of thousands of Malayan Chinese who might be hostile to Japan. He is also alleged to have cannibalized an executed American flyer during the occupation of Singapore.

He was then transferred to the staff of General Homma in the Philippines. After the US surrendered there, Tsuji sought to have all American prisoners killed and encouraged the brutal mistreatment and casual murder of prisoners in the Bataan Death March. He also had many captured officials of the Philippines government executed, including by ordering the execution of Filipino Chief Justice José Abad Santos and the attempted execution of former Speaker of the House of Representatives Manuel Roxas.

After the war, Japanese war criminals were prosecuted for the Bataan Death March, Sook Ching and other atrocities, but Tsuji fled and avoided trial. Some other army officials, who had followed Tsuji's command, were charged, and two of them were executed.

Homma countermanded many of the execution orders that had been pushed through by the Tsuji clique, including the execution orders for future Philippine president Manuel Roxas who was the former speaker of the house of representatives at that time. Homma saw these execution orders as a dishonorable violation of bushido ethics. However, Douglas MacArthur held him responsible for the actions of his subordinates and he was executed while Tsuji was on the run.

== World War II ==
In 1932, Tsuji saw action in China, and subsequently travelled as far as Sinkiang. He served as a staff officer in the Kwantung Army in 1937–1939. His aggressive and insubordinate attitude exacerbated the Soviet–Japanese border conflicts, and helped incite the Battle of Khalkhin Gol in 1939.

After the defeat at Khalkhin Gol, Tsuji opposed any further conflicts with the Soviet Union. After their attack on the Soviet Union in 1941, the Germans urged the Japanese to join the invasion, and many in the Japanese military wanted to avenge the defeat at Khalkhin Gol. However, Tsuji was an influential advocate of the attack on the United States. General Ryukichi Tanaka testified after the war that "the most determined single protagonist in favor of war with the United States was Tsuji Masanobu." Tsuji later wrote that his experience of Soviet firepower at Khalkhin Gol convinced him not to attack the Soviet Union in 1941.

His protectors in the Army got him safely transferred to Taiwan, where he helped organize the Army's jungle warfare school. He was then assigned to the Operations Section of the General Staff, where he became a strong advocate of war with the United States and Britain. It has been alleged that in late 1941, he planned the assassination of Prime Minister Konoe if Konoe achieved peace with the United States.

Tsuji planned the Malaya campaign for General Yamashita's 25th army. It started a few hours before the bombing of Pearl Harbour on 8 December 1941, and culminated in the defeat of the British at Singapore on 15 February 1942. Following this, the Japanese army massacred thousands of Chinese civilians in Malaya and Singapore in Operation Sook Ching and Tsuji is thought to have been the planner for this war crime as well.

Tsuji planned the Japanese overland attack in New Guinea, via the Kokoda Trail. In that as in other operations, he ordered bold offensive moves, regardless of difficulties or the costs to the troops involved.

In late 1942, Tsuji went to Guadalcanal, where he planned and led the last major Japanese attack on 23–24 October. After the attacks were defeated, Tsuji went to Tokyo in person to urge additional reinforcements. However, he then accepted the Navy's conclusion that nothing could get through and recommended the evacuation of the remaining troops. He impressed the Emperor with his frankness.

However, the Guadalcanal fiasco had discredited him. He was sent to the Japanese HQ in Nanking, which was largely inactive, for the next year. While there, he made contacts with various Chinese, including both collaborators and agents of Chiang Kai-shek's government.

In mid-1944, Tsuji was sent to Burma, where Japanese forces had been repulsed at Imphal. Tsuji was assigned to the 33rd Army, which faced the Chinese in northeastern Burma. He was an energetic and efficient planner, if notoriously arrogant, and once helped quell panic in the ranks by ostentatiously having a bath under fire in the front lines. While in Burma, he engaged in cannibalism, consuming the raw liver of a captured British or American airman. He declared, "The more we consume, the more we shall be infused with a hostile spirit toward the enemy."

== Postwar life and disappearance ==
When the Japanese position in Burma collapsed in 1945, Tsuji escaped, first to Thailand and then to China, where he renewed the contacts made in Nanking. He also visited Vietnam, which was in disorder with the Viet Minh resisting the re-establishment of French rule. In China, Tsuji was both a prisoner and an employee of Chinese intelligence.

In 1948, he was allowed to resign from Chinese service and returned to Japan. He began publishing books and articles about his war experiences, including an account of the Japanese victory in Malaya. He also wrote of his years in hiding in Senkō Sanzenri (潜行三千里;) "3,000 li (Chinese miles) in hiding", which became a best seller. He was elected to the Diet in 1952, and re-elected twice.

In April 1961, he traveled to Laos and was never heard from again. It was thought that he might have been killed in the Laotian Civil War, but there were also rumors that he became an advisor to the North Vietnamese government. He was declared dead on 20 July 1968.

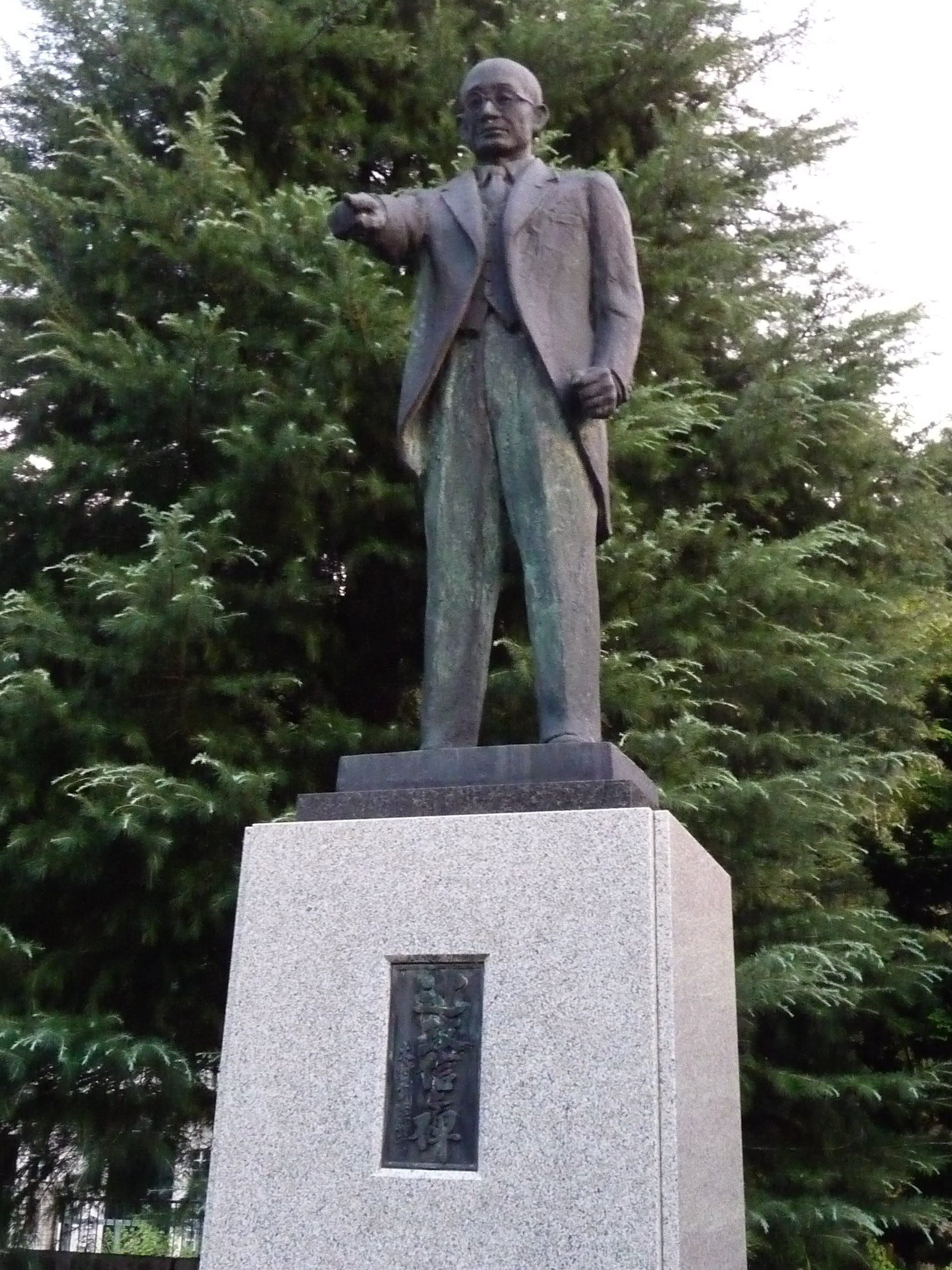
Memorial statue of Masanobu Tsuji in Kaga, Ishikawa

== Information later disclosed in CIA files ==
CIA files declassified in 2005–2006 show that Tsuji also worked for the CIA as a spy during the Cold War. The files also acknowledged Tsuji's writings in his book Senkō Sanzenri to be mostly factual. The documents described Tsuji to be an "inseparable pair" with Takushiro Hattori and stated them to be "extremely irresponsible" and that they "will not take the consequences for their actions." Additionally, Tsuji was stated to be "the type of man who given the chance, would start World War III without any misgivings." As an asset to the CIA, he was described as having no value because of lack of expertise in politics and information manipulation.

Additionally, the files contain information that Hattori had allegedly planned a coup to overthrow the Japanese government in 1952 that involved the assassination of Prime Minister Shigeru Yoshida and replacing him with Ichirō Hatoyama of the DPJ, but Tsuji prevented the coup by persuading the group that the real enemies were not conservatives like Yoshida but the Socialist Party. However, the files also state that the CIA learned about the attempt only after the fact and that the information was gained from an unreliable source from China. Some academics such as the media theorist and Americanist Tetsuo Arima of Waseda University have suggested that the entire story might have been a bluff leaked to the Chinese by Tsuji himself as a way to make him seem more influential than he actually was.

According to the CIA files, when Tsuji returned to Vientiane from Hanoi, he was kidnapped by the Chinese Communist Party and was being imprisoned in Yunnan, ostensibly to be used in some way to worsen Japanese-American relations or Japan's standing in Southeast Asia. Tsuji was considered to be still alive as of 8 August 1962 on the basis of handwriting analysis conducted on the writing on an envelope that was brought on 24 August 1962. However, he was never heard from again.

== See also ==
- List of people who disappeared

== Honors ==
- Order of the Sacred Treasure, 3rd Class
- Order of the Golden Kite, 4th Class and 5th Class
- Order of the Rising Sun, Gold Rays with Rosette
- Decoration of Manchuria, 4th Class and 5th Class
- Commemoration Medal of the Coronation of Emperor Showa
- Commemoration Medal of the Census
- Commemoration Medal of the Founding of Manchuria
- Commemoration Medal of the 2,600th Year after the Accession of Emperor Jimmu
- Campaign Medal of the Chinese Incident
- Campaign Medal of the Manchurian Incident
