= Pantingan River massacre =

1942 massacre in the Philippines by Japan

- Part of the Bataan Death March
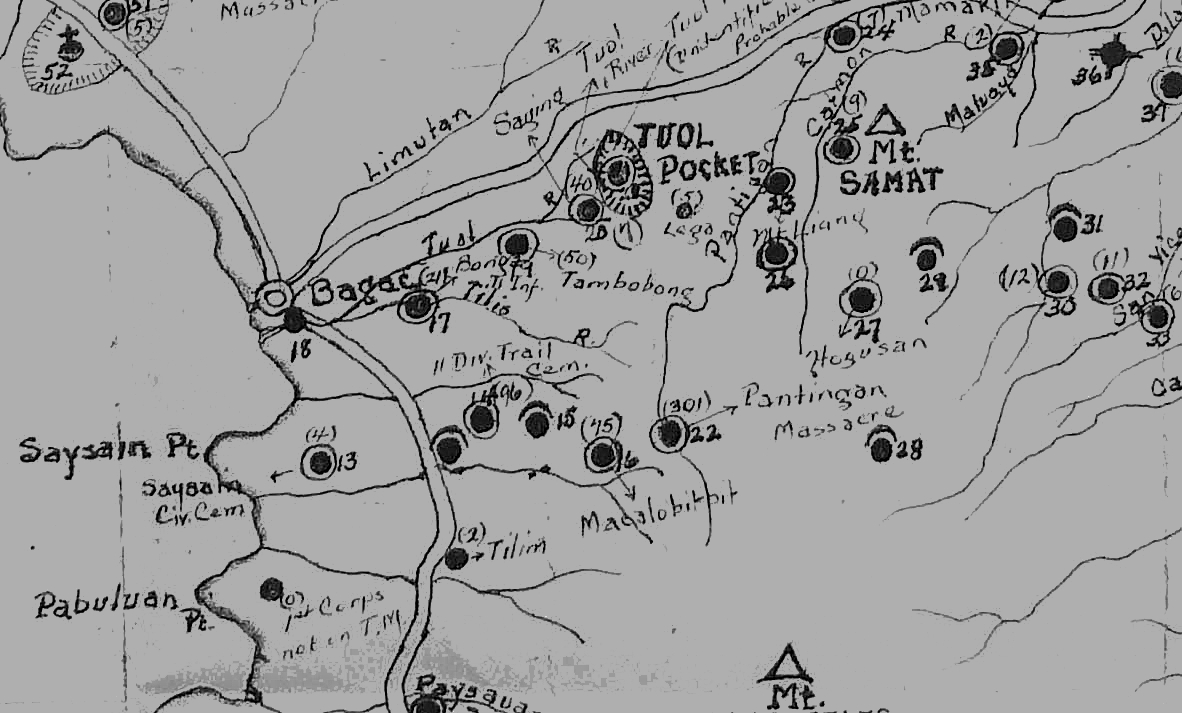
- Portion of Bataan disinterment map highlighting the site of the Pantingan Massacre
- Location: Bataan, Luzon, Philippines
- Date: April 12, 1942
- Attack type: Massacre, war crime, summary execution
- Deaths: 400 American prisoners of war
- Perpetrator: Imperial Japanese Army

The Pantingan River massacre (Filipino: Pagpatay sa Ilog Pantingan) was the mass execution of Filipino and American officers and non-commissioned officers prisoners-of-war by members of the Imperial Japanese Army during the Bataan Death March on April 12, 1942, in Bagac, Bataan. Several hundred soldiers from the Philippine Commonwealth Army's 1st, 11th, 71st, and 91st Divisions on the march to the north of Mount Samat where the Pantingan River crosses the Pilar-Bagac Road were taken to the riverside. Most of them were hog tied with telephone wire, shot, bayoneted or beheaded by the Imperial Japanese Army.

The atrocity was attributed to Japanese Colonel Masanobu Tsuji, who oversaw it. Following Tsuji's abnormal order, which was considered to be a war crime and beyond his commission, the Japanese 122nd Regiment of 65th Brigade executed the US and Philippine soldiers in the Pantingan River. Colonel Takeo Imai, of another Japanese regiment, doubted the authority of the order. Imai ignored the cruel order and did not execute anyone.

Survivors of the massacre include Lt. Manuel Yan who later became the head of the Armed Forces of the Philippines and ambassador to Thailand. Another survivor, Capt. Ricardo Papa, a G-3 Officer of the 91st Division later became a Chief of Police in Manila. A Pantingan River Massacre Historical Marker is located at DD coordinates 14.63181, 120.47446.

== See also ==
- Battle of the Philippines (1941–42)
