= Bataan Memorial Death March =

Annual walking event at White Sands Missile Range, New Mexico, US

- Date: Typically third or fourth Saturday in March
- Location: White Sands Missile Range
- Event type: Cleared path
- Distance: Marathon and march
- Established: 1989
- Website: www.bataanmarch.com

The Bataan Memorial Death March is an annual commemoration of the Bataan Death March attended by many of the survivors of the march, along with thousands of supporters from around the world, held at White Sands Missile Range, New Mexico. Held annually since 1989, this is a full marathon, or a 15 mi (24 km) route for those who do not wish to complete the full course. Covering paved road and sandy trails, it is regarded by Marathon Guide as one of the top 30 marathons in the U.S.

The race is open to all members of the public, though a significant portion of the participants are members of military units of the U.S. and foreign armed forces and their families. Civilians usually run in the full marathon, which is timed with awards though not certified by USA Track and Field. Several surviving Bataan prisoners usually await the competitors to congratulate them on completing the grueling march. Many injured veterans including some amputees attend to march as well.

The race continues all day, with the slowest marchers taking over 12 hours to complete the course.

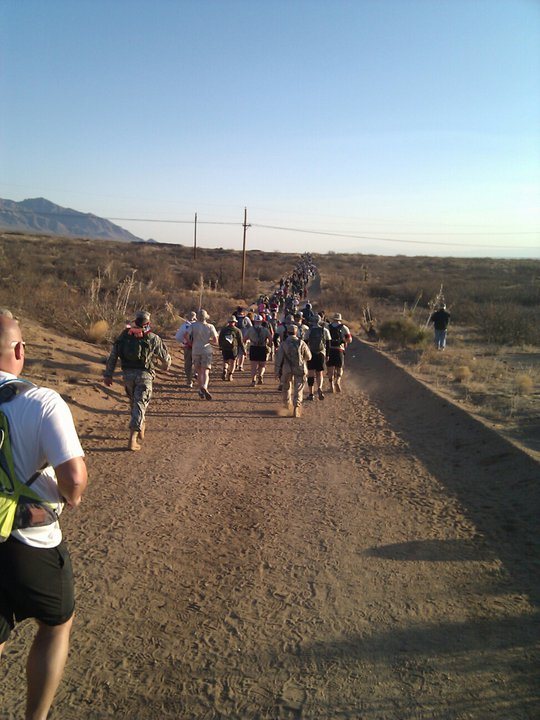
Runners along the course of the Bataan Memorial Death March marathon at WSMR

In 2011, a record 6,300 marchers participated in both the marathon and the 15.4 mi (24.8 km) course. In 2012 over 7,000 marchers competed and due to the heat and conditions 2012 became the most medicated march yet. In 2013, conditions were such that a weather advisory was put out to the 5,800 participants to reconsider running the race if they had not trained in the heat or at higher altitudes and that officials were considering altering or canceling the event. In 2018, over 8,000 participated in the march.

== Race categories ==
There are two individual categories ("light" and "heavy") and one team category, and two divisions: civilian and military. In the light category, runners may wear standard distance-running apparel; in the heavy division they must carry a minimum of 35 lb (16 kg) in rucksacks or backpacks in addition to any consumables. Military entrants must wear their Army Combat Uniform (ACUs) or other service equivalent uniform.

A team must include exactly 5 people, and only finishes the race if all members finish within twenty seconds of each other, on the principle that one does not leave teammates behind.
