= Bataan Death March =

1942 Japanese war crime in the Philippines

- Part of the Battle of Bataan of the Philippines campaign of the Pacific War
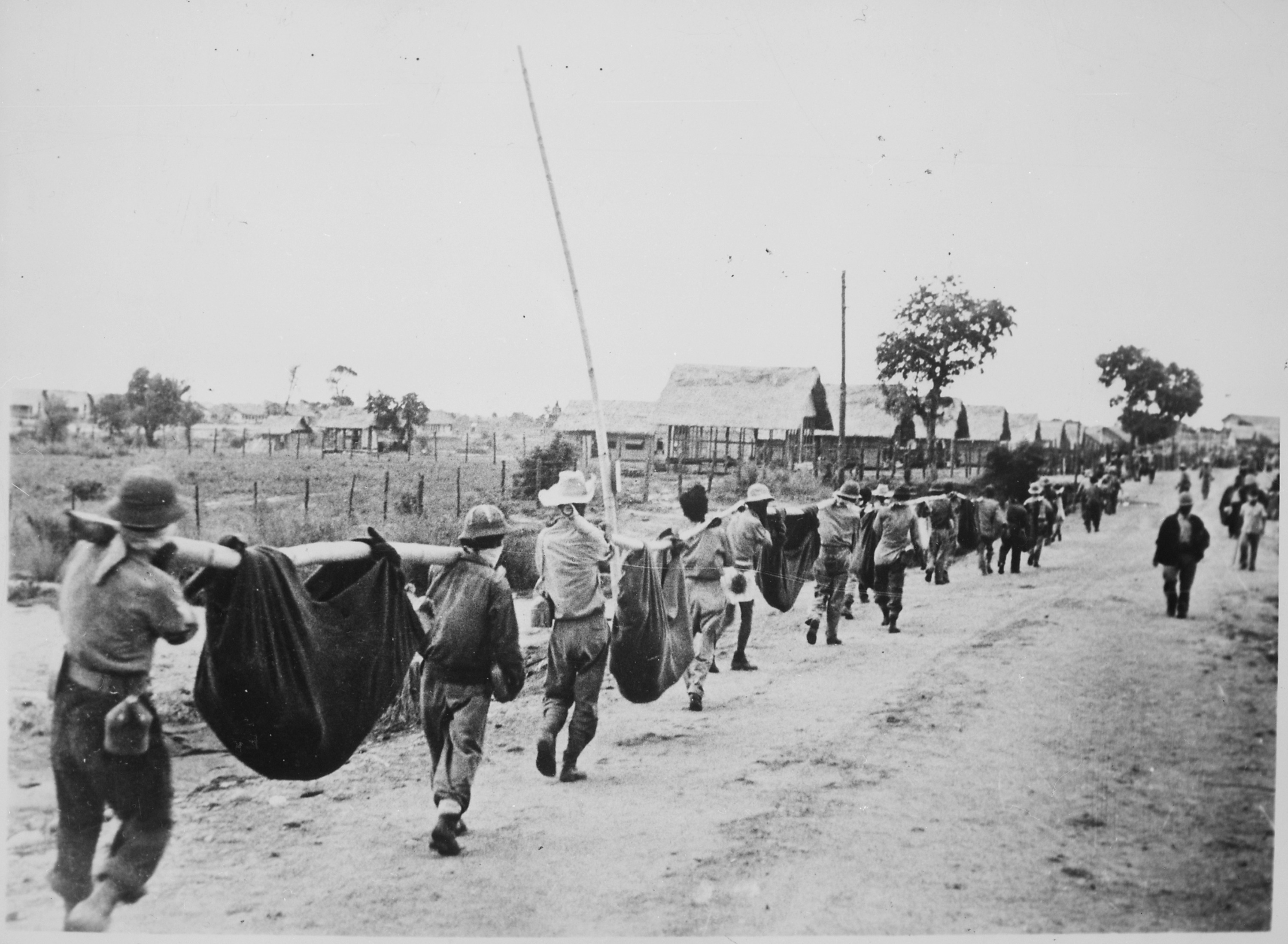
- Location: Mariveles, Bataan and Bagac, Bataan to Capas, Tarlac, Luzon Island, Philippines, Empire of Japan
- Date: April 9–17, 1942
- Attack type: Death march, mass murder
- Deaths: 5,500 to 18,650
- Victims: American and Filipino prisoners of war
- Perpetrator: Imperial Japanese Army

The Bataan Death March (Note: Filipino: Martsa ng Kamatayan sa Bataan; Spanish: Marcha fatal de Bataán; Kapampangan: Martsa ning Kematayan king Bataan; Ilocano: Martsa ti Ipapatay iti Bataan; Pangasinan: Panagmartsa na Patey ed Bataan; Japanese: バターン死の行進, romanized: Batān Shi no Kōshin) was the forcible transfer by the Imperial Japanese Army of around 72,000 to 78,000 Filipino (about 66,000) and American (about 12,000) prisoners of war (POWs) from the municipalities of Bagac and Mariveles on the Bataan Peninsula to Camp O'Donnell via San Fernando.

The transfer began on April 9, 1942, after the three-month Battle of Bataan in the Philippines during World War II. The total distance marched from Mariveles to San Fernando and from the Capas Train Station to various camps was 105 kilometres (65 mi). Sources also report widely differing prisoner of war casualties before reaching Camp O'Donnell: from 5,000 to 18,000 Filipino deaths and 500 to 650 American deaths during the march.

The march was characterized by severe physical abuse and wanton killings, including the Pantingan River massacre during which up to 400 prisoners were executed. POWs who fell or were caught on the ground were shot. After the war, the Japanese commander, General Masaharu Homma, and two of his officers, Major General Yoshitaka Kawane and Colonel Kurataro Hirano, were tried by United States military commissions for war crimes and sentenced to death on charges of failing to prevent their subordinates from committing atrocities. Homma was executed in 1946, and Kawane and Hirano in 1949. However, Masanobu Tsuji, the mastermind behind the Pantingan River massacre, fled and went into hiding, evading prosecution for his crimes. Tsuji served several foreign intelligence agencies after the war, before disappearing in Laos in April 1961. Tsuji was declared dead seven years later.

== Background ==
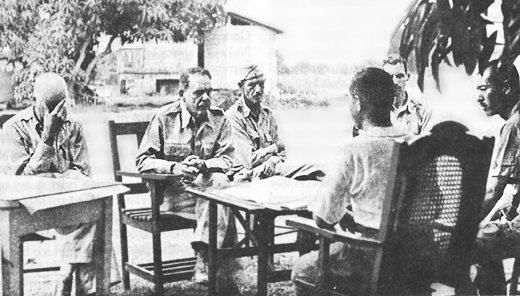
General Edward P. King discusses surrender terms with Japanese officers to end the Battle of Bataan

=== Prelude ===
When General Douglas MacArthur returned to active duty, the latest revision of plans for the defense of the Philippine Islands—War Plan Orange 3 (WPO-3)—was politically unrealistic, as it assumed a conflict only involving the United States and Japan, not the combined Axis powers. However, the plan was tactically sound, and its provisions for defense were applicable under any local situation.

Under WPO-3, the mission of the Philippine garrison was to hold the entrance to Manila Bay and deny its use to Japanese naval forces. If the enemy prevailed, the Americans were to hold back the Japanese advance while withdrawing to the Bataan Peninsula, which was recognized as the key to the control of Manila Bay. It was to be defended to the "last extremity". MacArthur assumed command of the Allied army in July 1941 and rejected WPO-3 as defeatist, preferring a more aggressive course of action. He recommended—among other things—a coastal defense strategy that would include the entire archipelago. His recommendations were followed in the plan that was eventually approved.

The main force of General Masaharu Homma's 14th Army came ashore at Lingayen Gulf on the morning of December 22, 1941. The defenders failed to hold the beaches. By the end of the day, the Japanese had secured most of their objectives and were in position to emerge onto the central plain. Late in the afternoon of December 23, General Jonathan Wainwright telephoned MacArthur's headquarters in Manila and informed him that any further defense of the Lingayen beaches was "impracticable". He requested and was permitted to withdraw behind the Agno River. MacArthur decided to abandon his plan for defense and revert to WPO-3, evacuating President Manuel L. Quezon, High Commissioner Francis B. Sayre, their families, and his headquarters to Corregidor on December 24. A rear echelon, headed by the deputy chief of staff, Brigadier General Richard J. Marshall, remained behind in Manila to close out the headquarters and to supervise the shipment of supplies and the evacuation of the remaining troops.

On December 26, Manila was officially declared an open city, and MacArthur's proclamation was published in the newspapers and broadcast over the radio.

The Battle of Bataan began on January 7, 1942, and continued until April 9, when the United States Army Forces in the Far East (USAFFE) commander, Major General Edward P. King, surrendered to Colonel Motō Nakayama of the 14th Army. King went against his superior's orders and told his troops to lay down their arms, accepting personal responsibility for the surrender. He made the following statement: "You men remember this. You did not surrender … you had no alternative but to obey my order."

=== Allied surrender ===
Homma and his staff encountered almost twice as many captives as his reports had estimated, creating an enormous logistical challenge: the transport and movement of over 60,000 starved, sick, debilitated and wounded prisoners and over 38,000 equally weakened civilian noncombatants who had been caught up in the battle. The general wanted to move the prisoners and refugees to the north, in preparation for his final assault on Corregidor, but there was simply not enough mechanized transport for the newly captured masses.

== Forced march ==
Route of the death march. The section from San Fernando to Capas was by rail cars.

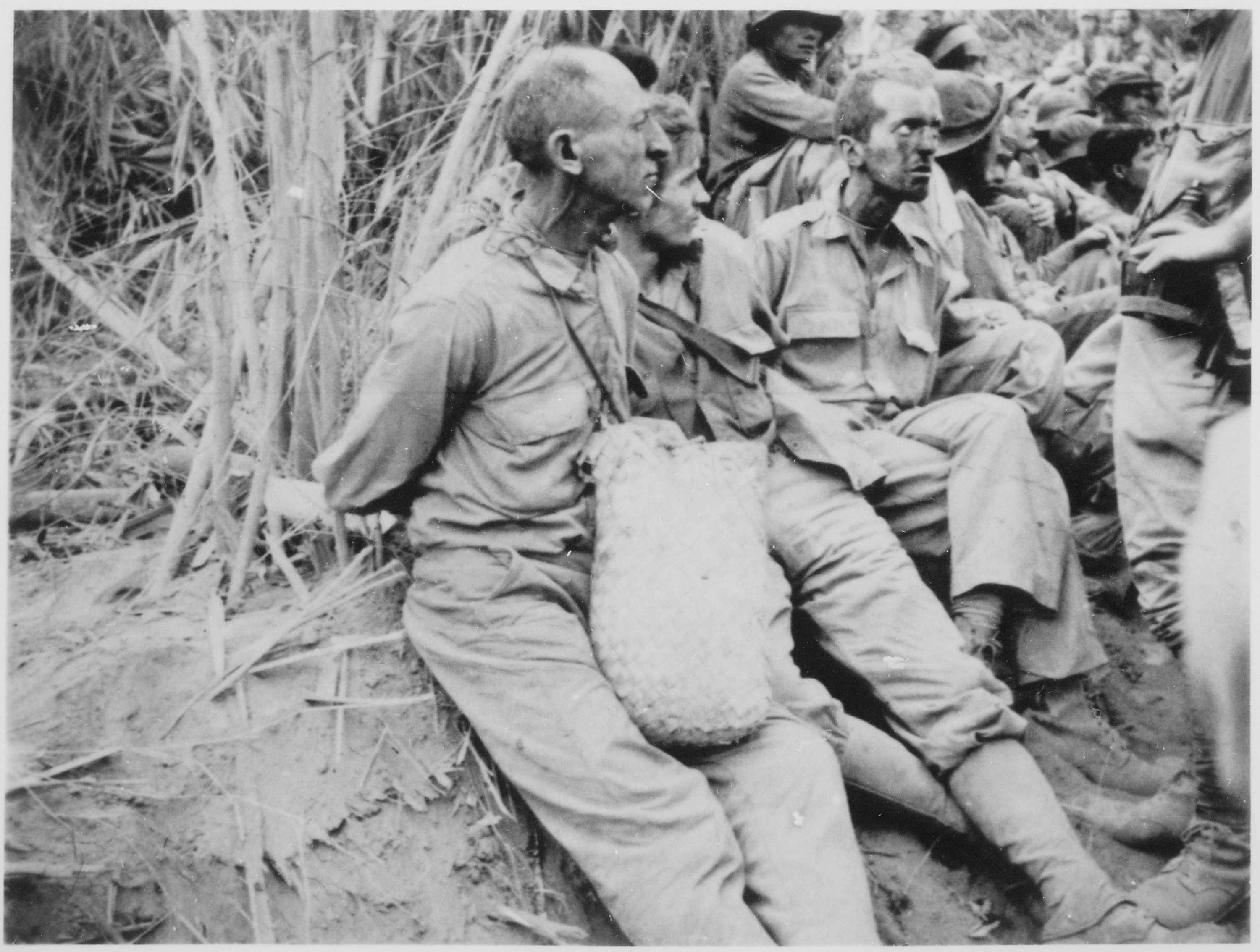
Prisoners photographed during the march. They have their hands tied behind their backs. They are (left to right): Pvt Samuel Stenzler (d. May 1942); Pvt Frank Spears (killed June 1945); Capt James McDonnell Gallagher, who died shortly after this picture was taken on April 9, 1942

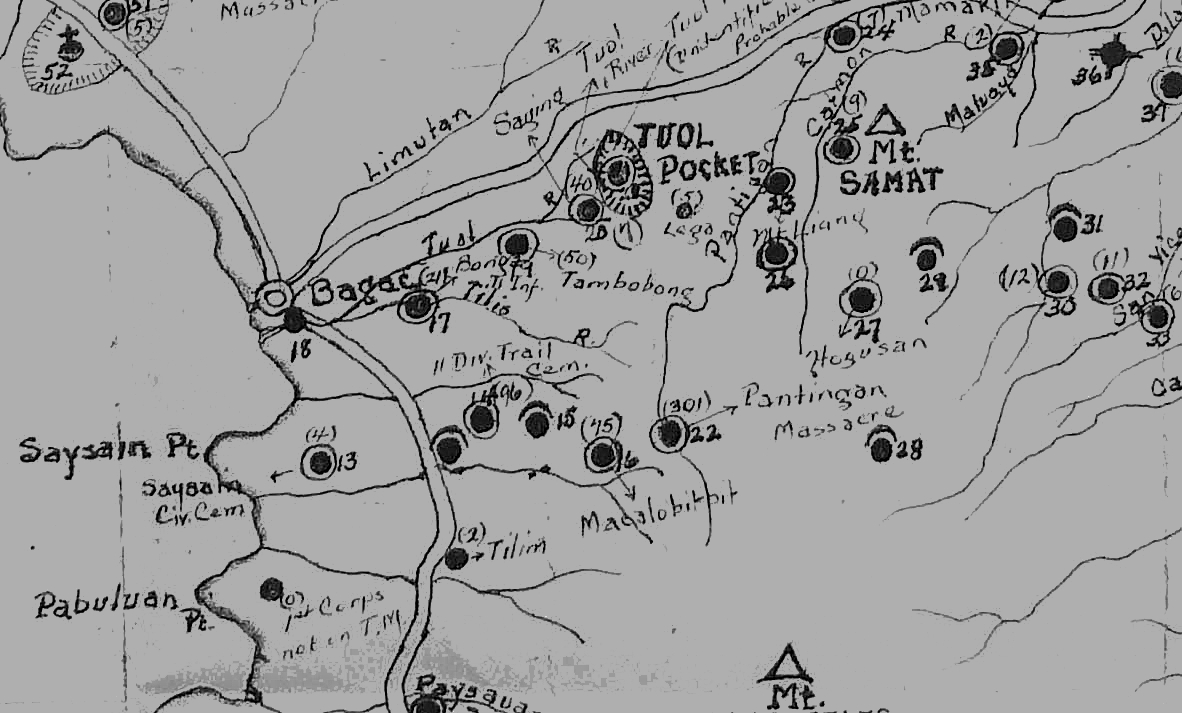
Portion of Bataan disinterment map highlighting the site of the Panintingan massacre

Following the surrender of Bataan on April 9, 1942 to the Imperial Japanese Army, prisoners were amassed in the towns of Mariveles and Bagac. They were ordered to turn over their possessions. American Lieutenant Kermit Lay recounted how this was done:

They pulled us off into a rice paddy and began shaking us down. There [were] about a hundred of us so it took time to get to all of us. Everyone had pulled their pockets wrong side out and laid all their things out in front. They were taking jewelry and doing a lot of slapping. I laid out my New Testament. ... After the shakedown, the Japs took an officer and two enlisted men behind a rice shack and shot them. The men who had been next to them said they had Japanese souvenirs and money.^{:37}

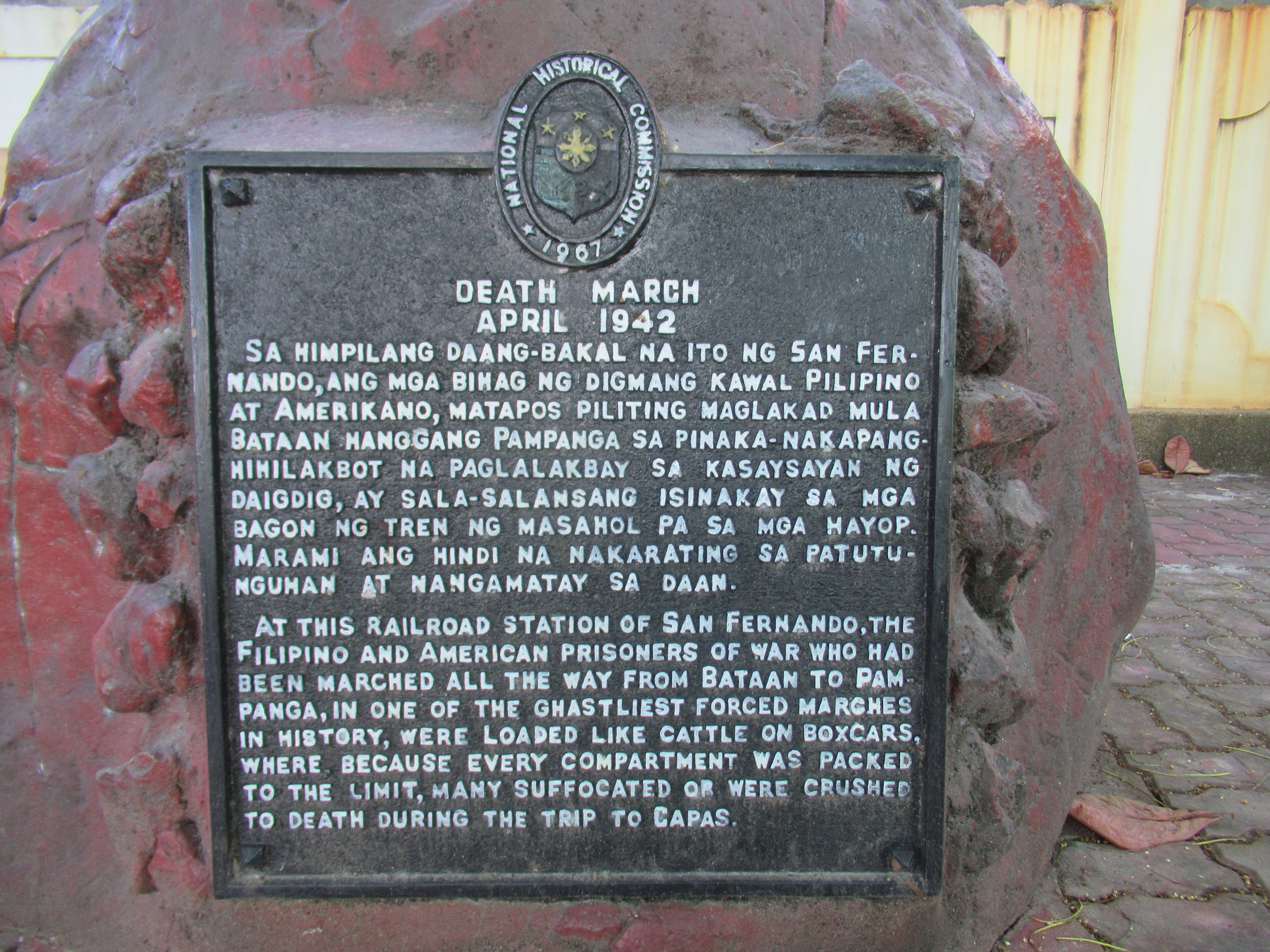
San Fernando station (Pampanga) April 1942 monument

Word quickly spread among the prisoners to conceal or destroy any Japanese money or mementos, as their captors would assume it had been stolen from dead Japanese soldiers.^{:37} American soldier Bert Bank recalls:

One of the POWs had a ring on and the Japanese guard attempted to get the ring off. He couldn't get it off and he took a machete and cut the man's wrist off and when he did that, of course the man was bleeding profusely. [I tried to help him] but when I looked back I saw a Japanese guard sticking a bayonet through his stomach.

Prisoners started out from Mariveles on April 10 and from Bagac on April 11, converging in Pilar and heading north to the San Fernando railhead. The prisoners were put in groups of 100 men each, with four Japanese guards per group. At the beginning, there were rare instances of kindness by Japanese officers and those Japanese soldiers who spoke English, such as the sharing of food and cigarettes and permitting personal possessions to be kept. One prisoner who'd been a star football player at Notre Dame had his class ring taken by a guard. It was later returned by a Japanese officer who attended Notre Dame rival USC, had seen him play and had admired his athletic skills. This, however, was quickly followed by unrelenting brutality, theft, and even knocking men's teeth out for gold fillings, as the common Japanese soldier had also suffered in the battle for Bataan and had nothing but disgust and hatred for his "captives" (Japan did not recognize these people as POWs). The first atrocity—attributed to Colonel Masanobu Tsuji—occurred when approximately 350 to 400 Filipino officers and non-commissioned officers under his supervision were summarily executed in the Pantingan River massacre after they had surrendered. Tsuji—acting against General Homma's wishes that the prisoners be transferred peacefully—had issued clandestine orders to Japanese officers to summarily execute all American "captives". Although some Japanese officers ignored the orders, others were receptive to the idea of murdering POWs.

During the march, prisoners received little food or water, and many died. They were subjected to severe physical abuse, including beatings and torture. On the march, the "sun treatment" was a common form of torture. Prisoners were forced to sit in sweltering direct sunlight without helmets or other head coverings. Anyone who asked for water was shot dead. Some men were told to strip naked or sit within sight of fresh, cool water.^{:40} Trucks drove over some of those who fell or succumbed to fatigue, and "cleanup crews" killed those too weak to continue, though trucks picked up some of those too fatigued to go on. Prisoners were randomly stabbed with bayonets or beaten.

Once the surviving prisoners arrived in Balanga, the overcrowded conditions and poor hygiene caused dysentery and other diseases to spread rapidly. The Japanese did not provide the prisoners with medical care, so U.S. medical personnel tended to the sick and wounded with few or no supplies. Upon arrival at the San Fernando railhead, prisoners were stuffed into sweltering, brutally hot metal box cars for the one-hour trip to Capas, in 43 °C (110 °F) heat. At least 100 prisoners were pushed into each of the unventilated boxcars. The trains had no sanitation facilities, and disease continued to take a heavy toll on the prisoners. According to Staff Sergeant Alf Larson:

The train consisted of six or seven World War I-era boxcars. ... They packed us in the cars like sardines, so tight you couldn't sit down. Then they shut the door. If you passed out, you couldn't fall down. If someone had to go to the toilet, you went right there where you were. It was close to summer and the weather was hot and humid, hotter than Billy Blazes! We were on the train from early morning to late afternoon without getting out. People died in the railroad cars.^{:45}

Upon arrival at the Capas train station, they were forced to walk the final 14 kilometres (8.7 mi) to Camp O'Donnell. Even after arriving at Camp O'Donnell, the survivors of the march continued to die at rates of up to several hundred per day, which amounted to a death toll of as many as 20,000 Americans and Filipinos. Most of the dead were buried in mass graves that the Japanese had dug behind the barbed wire surrounding the compound. Of the estimated 80,000 POWs at the march, only 54,000 made it to Camp O'Donnell.

The total distance of the march from Mariveles to San Fernando and from Capas to Camp O'Donnell is variously reported by differing sources as between 96.6 and 112 kilometres (60.0 and 69.6 mi). The Death March was later judged by an Allied military commission to be a Japanese war crime.

=== Casualty estimates ===
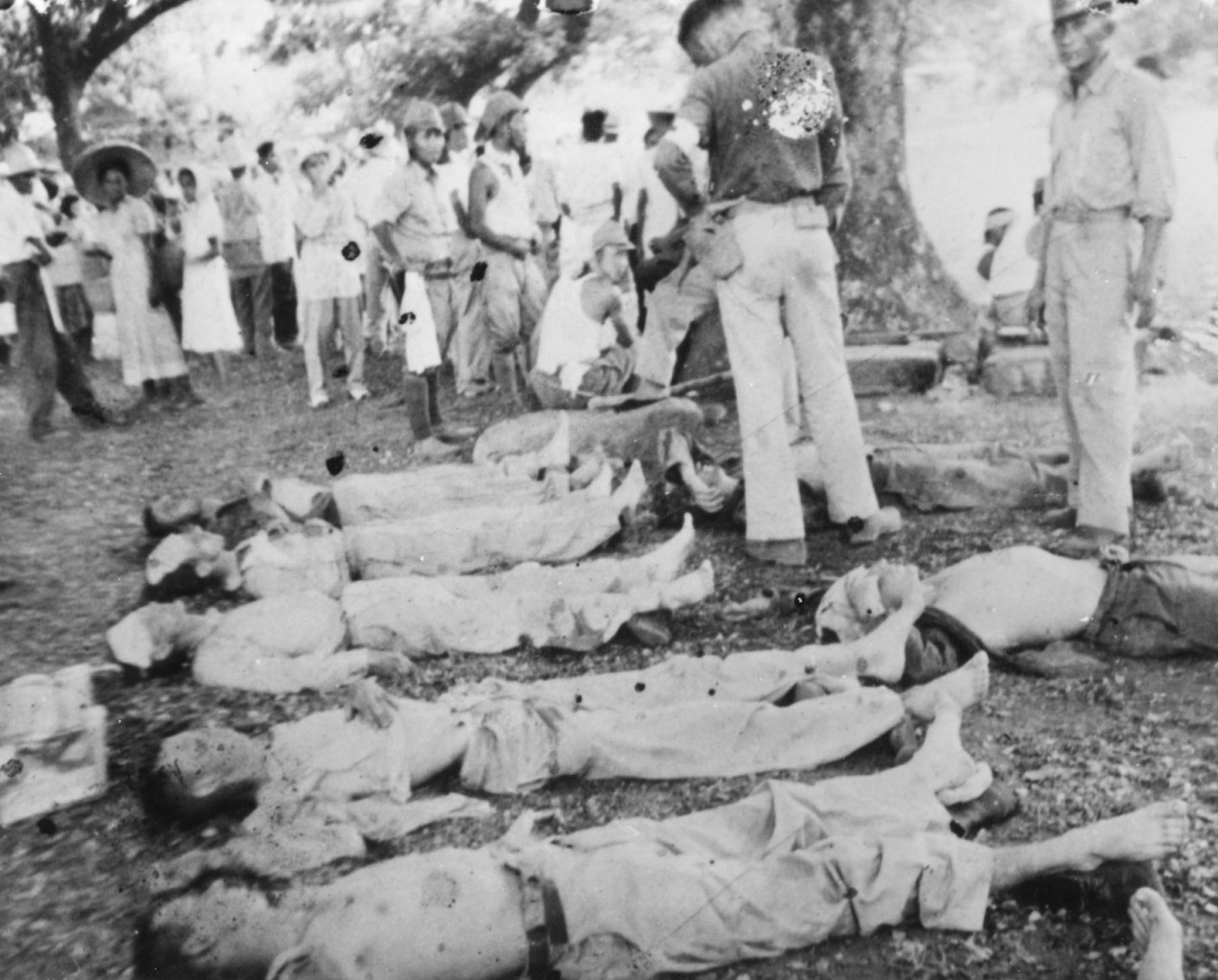
Fallen soldiers during the Death March

In an attempt to calculate the number of deaths during the march on the basis of evidence, Stanley L. Falk takes the number of American and Filipino troops known to have been present in Bataan at the start of April, subtracts the number known to have escaped to Corregidor and the number known to have remained in the hospital at Bataan. He makes a conservative estimate of the number killed in the final days of fighting and of the number who fled into the jungle rather than surrender to the Japanese. On this basis he suggests 600 to 650 American deaths and 5,000 to 10,000 Filipino deaths. Other sources report death numbers ranging from 5,000 to 18,000 Filipino deaths and 500 to 650 American deaths during the march.

== Wartime public responses ==
News of the Bataan Death March sparked outrage in the US, as reflected in this U.S Army propaganda poster.

=== United States ===
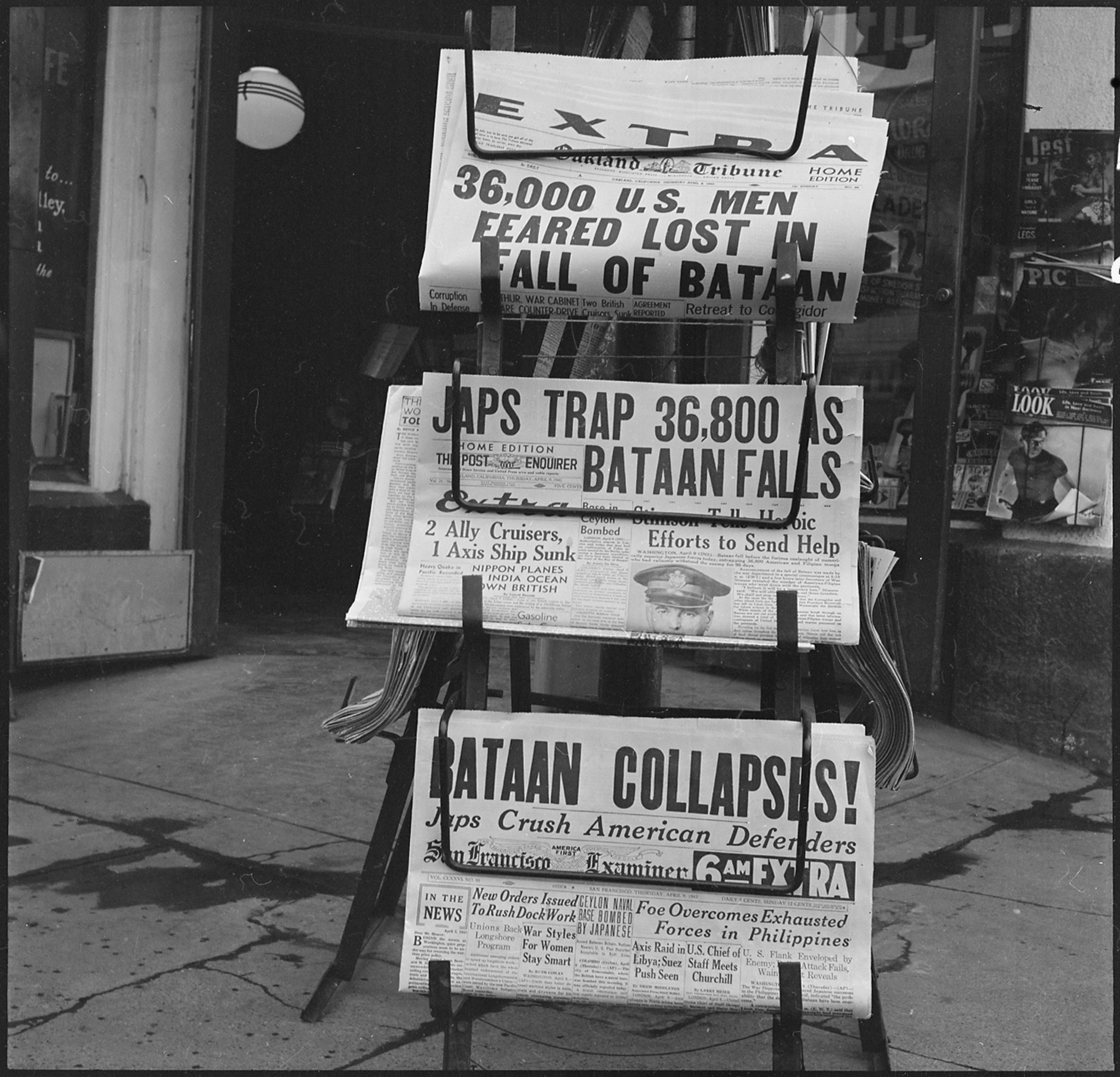
Newspapers in a Hayward, California newsstand, after the fall of Bataan

It was not until January 27, 1944, that the U.S. government informed the American public about the march, when it released sworn statements of military officers who had escaped. Shortly thereafter, the stories of these officers were featured in a Life magazine article. The Bataan Death March and other Japanese actions were used to arouse fury in the United States. America would go on to avenge its defeat that occurred in the Philippines during the Battle of Leyte in October 1944. U.S. and Filipino forces went on to recapture the Bataan Peninsula in January 1945, and Manila was liberated in early March.

General George Marshall made the following statement:

These brutal reprisals upon helpless victims evidence the shallow advance from savagery which the Japanese people have made. ... We serve notice upon the Japanese military and political leaders as well as the Japanese people that the future of the Japanese race itself, depends entirely and irrevocably upon their capacity to progress beyond their aboriginal barbaric instincts.

=== Japanese ===
In an attempt to counter the American propaganda value of the march, the Japanese had The Manila Times report that the prisoners were treated humanely and their death rate had to be attributed to the intransigence of the American commanders who did not surrender until the men were on the verge of death.

== War crimes trial ==
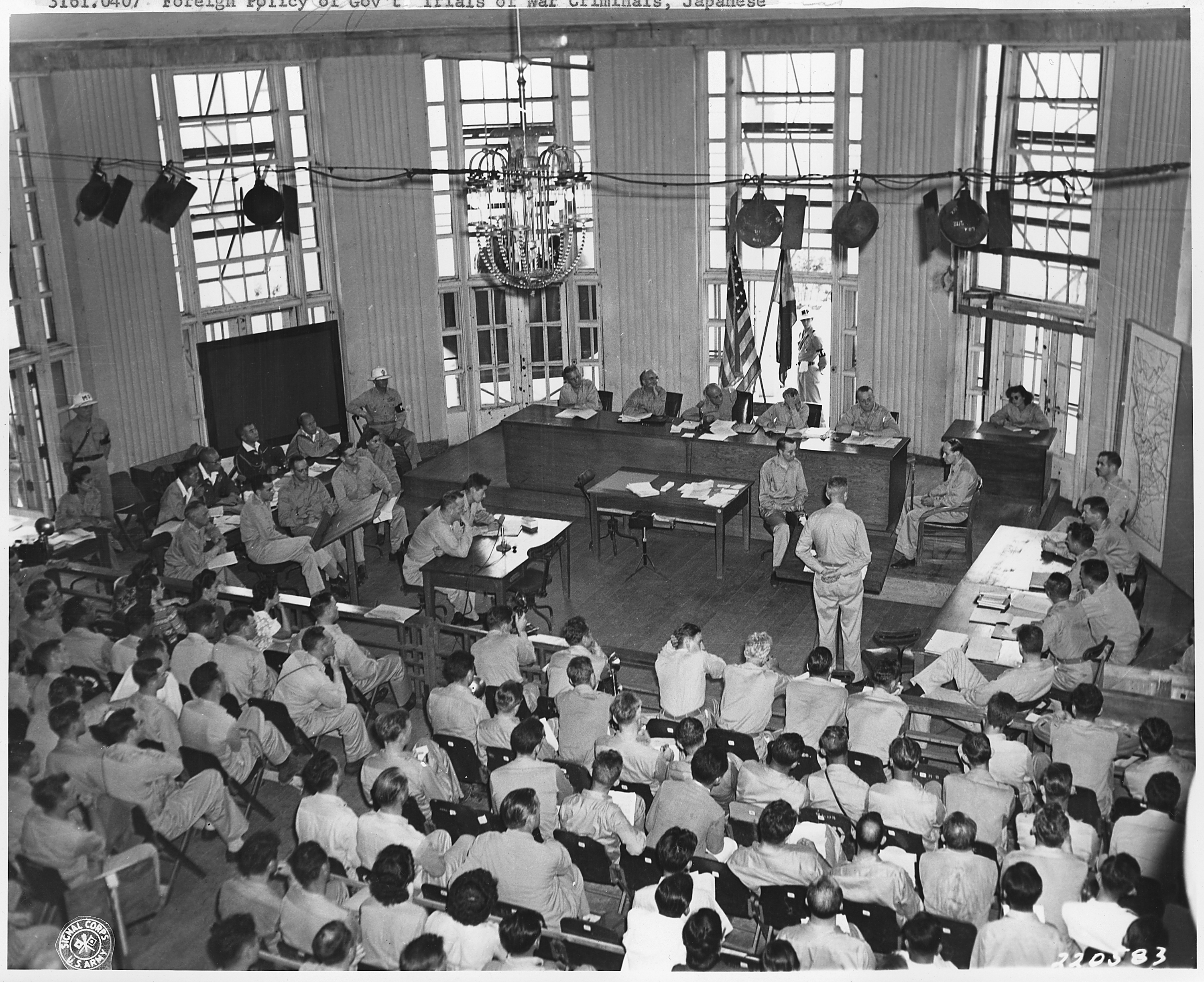
Japanese War Crimes Trials in Manila, 1945

In September 1945, Masaharu Homma was arrested by Allied troops and indicted for war crimes. He was charged with 43 separate counts, but the verdict did not distinguish among them, leaving some doubt over whether he was found guilty of them all, as Homma did not know the atrocities until the end of the war. Homma was found guilty of permitting members of his command to commit "brutal atrocities and other high crimes". The general, who had been absorbed in his efforts to capture Corregidor after the fall of Bataan, claimed in his defense that he remained ignorant of the high death toll of the death march until two months after the event. Homma's verdict was predicated on the doctrine of respondeat superior but with an added liability standard, since the latter could not be rebutted. On February 26, 1946, he was sentenced to death by firing squad and was executed on April 3 outside Manila.

Masanobu Tsuji (Note: Masanobu Tsuji, a colonel on the staff of General Homma also was complicit in the Sook Ching massacre. Post war, he fled to Thailand, then to China, successfully escaping trial. He subsequently returned to Japan in 1949 and was later elected to the National Diet. In 1961, he disappeared on a trip to Laos; it is thought that he might have been killed in the Laotian Civil War.) , who had directly ordered the killing of POWs (Pantingan River massacre), fled to China from Thailand when the war ended to escape from war trials of the allied powers. Two of Homma's subordinates, Major General Yoshitaka Kawane and Colonel Kurataro Hirano, were prosecuted by an American military commission in Yokohama in 1948, using evidence presented at the Homma trial. They were sentenced to death by hanging and executed at Sugamo Prison on June 12, 1949.

== Post-war commemorations, apologies, and memorials ==
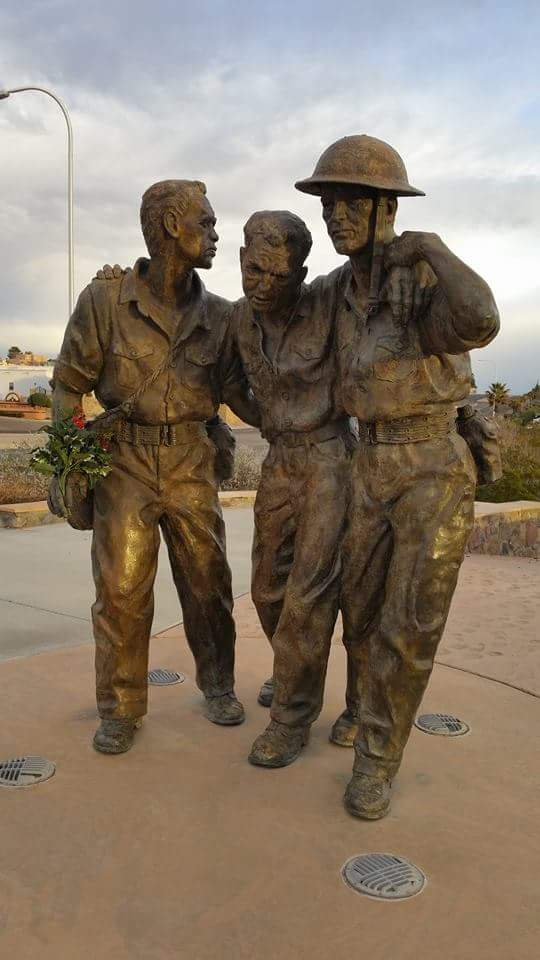
Bataan Death March Memorial featuring Filipino and American soldiers at the Veterans Memorial Park in Las Cruces, New Mexico

On September 13, 2010, Japanese Foreign Minister Katsuya Okada apologized to a group of six former American soldiers who had been held as prisoners of war by the Japanese, including 90-year-old Lester Tenney and Robert Rosendahl, both survivors of the Bataan Death March. The six, their families, and the families of two deceased soldiers were invited to visit Japan at the expense of the Japanese government.

In 2012, film producer Jan Thompson created a film documentary about the Death March, POW camps, and Japanese hell ships titled Never the Same: The Prisoner-of-War Experience. The film reproduced scenes of the camps and ships, showed drawings and writings of the prisoners, and featured Loretta Swit as the narrator.

Dozens of memorials (including monuments, plaques, and schools) dedicated to the prisoners who died during the Bataan Death March exist across the United States and in the Philippines. A wide variety of commemorative events are held to honor the victims, including holidays, athletic events such as ultramarathons, and memorial ceremonies held at military cemeteries. The Day of Valor is a Philippine national holiday that occurs every April 9, the day the Bataan Death March began.

=== New Mexico ===
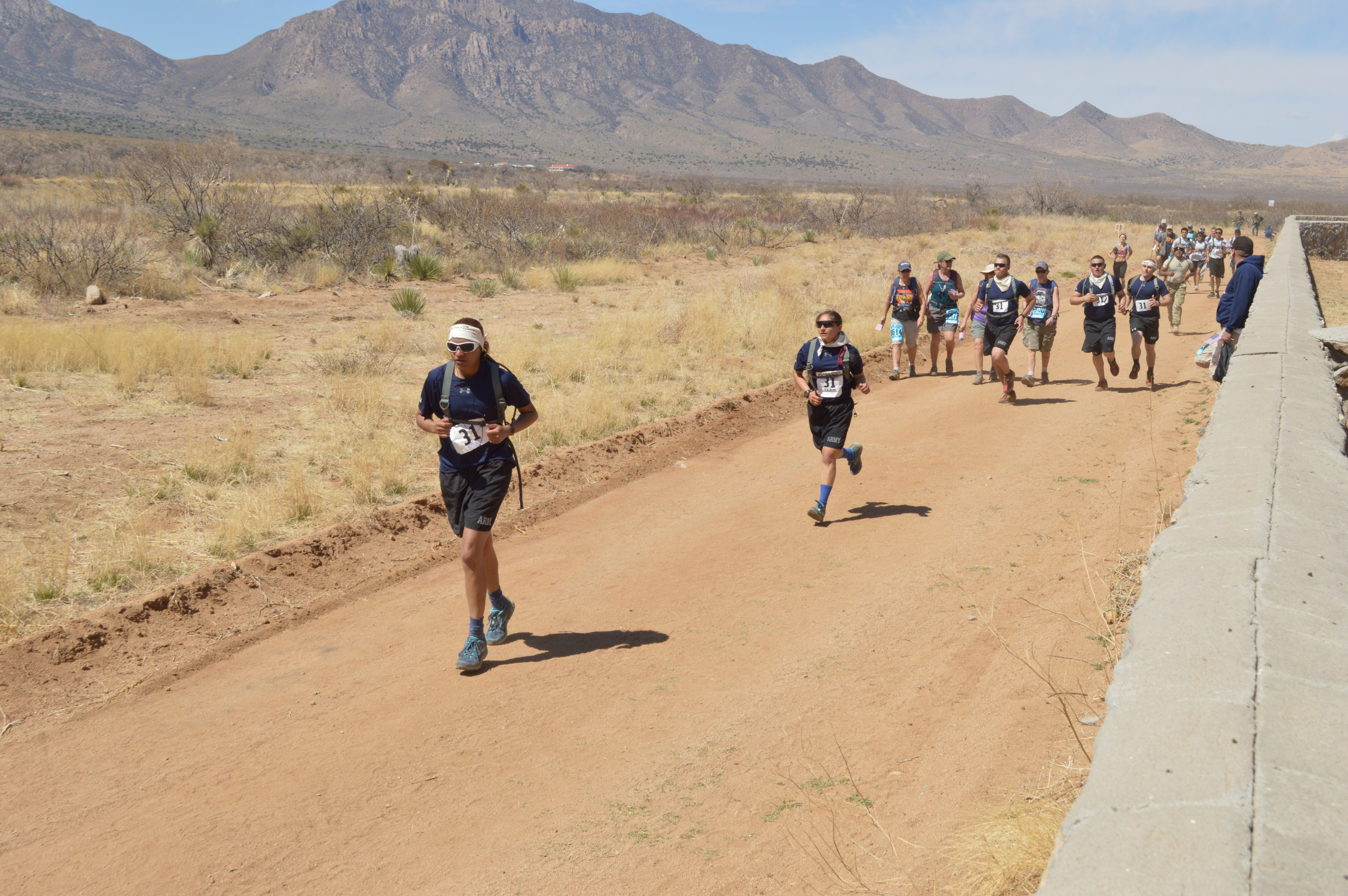
The 2013 Bataan Memorial Death March at the White Sands Missile Range

The Bataan Death March had a large impact on New Mexico, given that many of the American soldiers in Bataan were from that state, specifically from the 200th and 515th Coast Artillery of the National Guard. The New Mexico Military Museum is located in the armory where the soldiers of the 200th and 515th were processed before their deployment to the Philippines in 1941. The old state capitol building of New Mexico was renamed the Bataan Memorial Building and now houses several state government agency offices.

Every year in early spring, the Bataan Memorial Death March, a marathon-length 26.2-mile (42.2 km) march/run, is conducted at the White Sands Missile Range. On March 19, 2017, over 6,300 participants queued up at the starting line for the 28th annual event, breaking the previous record of attendance as well as the amount of non-perishable food collected for local food pantries and overall charitable goods donated.

The 200th and 515th Coast Artillery units had 1,816 men total. 829 died in battle, while prisoners, or immediately after liberation. There were 987 survivors. As of March 2017, only four of these veterans remained alive.

=== Diego Garcia, British Indian Ocean Territory ===
Due to the large population of Filipino workers on the island of Diego Garcia in the British Indian Ocean Territory, an annual memorial march is held. The date varies, but the marchers leave from the marina around 06:00 traveling by boat to Barton Point, where they proceed south to the plantation ruins. The memorial march is conducted by Filipino workers, British Royal Marines, British Royal Military Police, and United States sailors from various commands across the island.

== Notable captives and survivors ==
- José Agdamag
- Jesus C. Azurin
- Ramon Bagatsing
- Bert Bank
- Lewis C. Beebe
- Bull Benini
- Clifford Bluemel
- Albert Braun
- Thomas F. Breslin
- William E. Brougher
- Albert Brown
- Jose Calugas
- Mariano Castañeda
- Mateo Capinpin
- Lawrence S. Churchill
- Virgilio N. Cordero Jr.
- Pelagio Cruz
- Charles C. Drake
- William Dyess
- Alva R. Fitch
- Halstead C. Fowler
- Guillermo B. Francisco
- Arnold J. Funk
- Martin Gison
- Samuel A. Goldblith
- Jose Gozar
- Samuel Grashio
- Samuel L. Howard
- Ray C. Hunt
- Rafael Jalandoni
- Delfin Jaranilla
- Harold Keith Johnson
- Albert M. Jones
- Joe Kieyoomia
- Edward P. King
- Jesse Monroe Knowles
- Charles S. Lawrence
- Maxon S. Lough
- Robert W. Levering
- Vicente Lim
- Jose B. Lingad
- Angel Macapagal
- Allan C. McBride
- George F. Moore
- Dionisio Ojeda
- John E. Olson
- George M. Parker
- Clinton A. Pierce
- Fernando Poe Sr.
- Carlos Quirino
- Salvador A. Rodolfo Sr.
- Alejo Santos
- Alfredo M. Santos
- Fidel Segundo
- Clyde A. Selleck
- Robert Sheats
- Austin Shofner
- Luther R. Stevens
- Benigno G. Tabora
- Robert P. Taylor
- Mario Tonelli
- Thomas J. H. Trapnell
- Jesus Vargas
- James R.N. Weaver
- Arthur Wermuth
- Edgar Whitcomb
- Paul Wing
- Manuel T. Yan
- Teófilo Yldefonso
- Venancio Ziga

== See also ==
- Battle of the Philippines (1941–42)
- Manila massacre
- Raid at Cabanatuan
- The Great Raid (2005)
- The March (1945)
- USS Bataan (CVL-29)
- USS Bataan (LHD-5)
- Women of Valor (1986)
