= Las Cruces Veterans Memorial Park =

Park in Las Cruces, New Mexico

Coordinates: 32°20′5″N 106°45′3″W

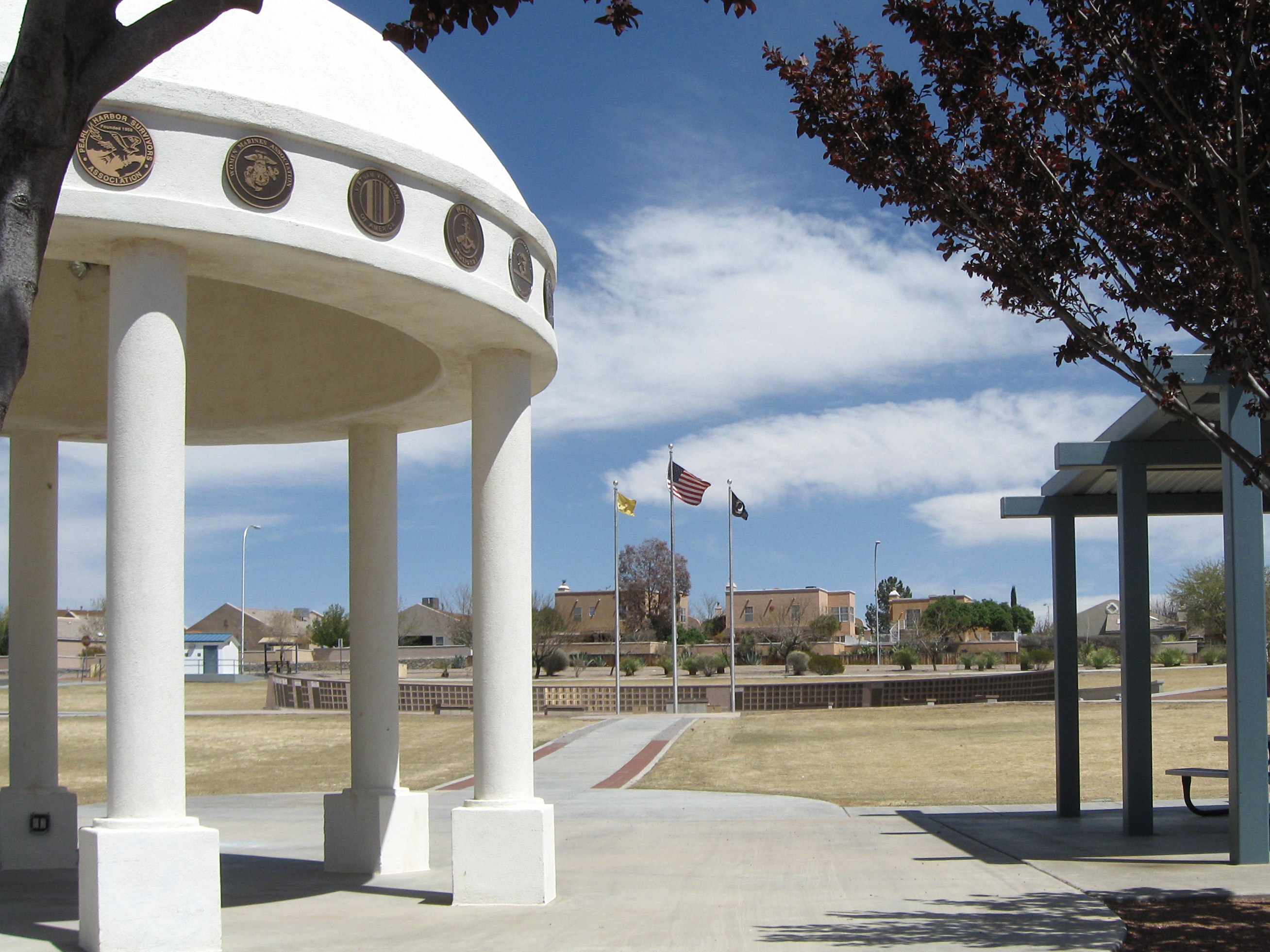
Las Cruces Veterans Memorial Park

Las Cruces, New Mexico

Veterans Memorial Park is a public park located in Las Cruces, New Mexico, which was constructed by Highland Enterprises of Las Cruces under the direction of the City and was dedicated on May 5, 1999. In honor and memorial of the men and women who fought and served in the United States armed forces and in particular, those who served from Las Cruces area, the Veterans Memorial Park exhibits monuments to honor their sacrifices made over the course of history. The history recognized begins from as early as the American Revolutionary War to the present day. The Veterans Memorial Park is organized and guided with a trail that directs visitors to the various monuments scattered throughout the park.

== History and principles of memorials ==
For thousands of years there has been architecture built in honor of remembrance, from the time of the pharaohs in Egypt to modern day. Structures can be created to symbolize or remember events, ideas or individuals that have passed on that have had a significant contribution in our world or in our own lives. Memorials are structurally created to help aid in the mourning process and help mourners reach a stage of peace. Mourning is a natural human response that occurs when something has been lost. There can be a need for replacement when something has been taken away. Because of this, memorials give people a place to go to reflect, honor, and pay respect. It also gives future generations the opportunity to remember a significant moment or person in history. Memorials can list names, as well as include photos, and artifacts. War can be associated with powerful memories, especially when it comes to the loss of lives. Veteran memorials are a way to remember and honor those that have been lost through war. These memorials can be seen all across America.

== Featured Monuments in Las Cruces ==
=== The Bataan Death March Memorial ===
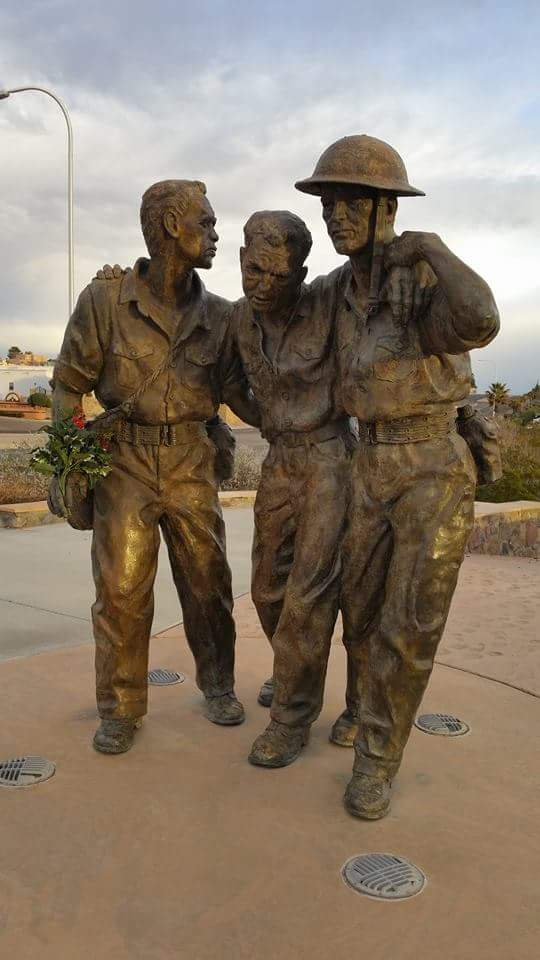
Bataan Death March Memorial

The Bataan Death March memorial, crafted by sculptor Kelley S. Hestir, features three large, bronze statues of American and Filipino soldiers supporting each other as they walk the six day march of over eighty miles to a Japanese prison camp in World War II. Surrounding the memorial are engraved footprints, representing the men who survived the march and the several who perished. As part of the memorial, the footprints themselves were placed by some of the soldiers who were forced to march across the Bataan Peninsula in 1942. The memorial was dedicated on April 13, 2002, sixty years after the lethal march that took the lives of an estimated five to ten thousand people. Following the completion of this monument, the city of Las Cruces has continued an annual tradition of executing a twenty six mile long march in the White Sands Missile Range in memory of these men represented in the memorial.

=== Veterans Memorial Wall ===
The Veterans Memorial Wall in the Memorial park was dedicated on November 11, 2005. 8,188 names are listed on the wall. These are the names of veterans that entered into military service from the county of Doña Ana in New Mexico. Those listed served anywhere from the Civil War through Operation Enduring Freedom. Currently, names of veterans that have served in Iraq or Afghanistan are listed on temporary plaques. These will eventually be replaced with permanent plaques.

=== Garrison Flag ===
Located on the park grounds is an 80-foot-long flag pole that is designed to hoist a 240 square foot (12’x20’) American garrison flag on special occasions and holidays. When the flag is scheduled to be raised, members of the public are typically invited to help veterans in raising and lowering the flag. On days when the garrison flag is not presented, a smaller, alternate post flag is flown instead. The large size of garrison flags first came into fruition during the War of 1812 when the people of Baltimore were expecting an attack from the British. As part of their preparations, Major George Armistead wanted “to have a flag so large that the British will have no difficulty in seeing it from a distance.” The great size of the flag has inspired many Americans, including Francis Scott Key when he wrote the words to “The Star-Spangled Banner.” A similar flag is flown in Las Cruces to instill patriotism in the guests who come to visit.

=== Veterans Memorial Gazebo ===
Each monument is strategically located throughout the park along a walkway. At the conclusion of the trail is the Veterans Memorial Gazebo. Easily identifiable along the rim of the gazebo are medallions stamped with the crest of the different branches of military in addition to other logos from a variety of military service organizations. Surrounding the gazebo are also picnic benches and tables with roofing to accommodate various activities and events for visitors.

=== Korean War Memorial ===
The Korean War Memorial is a gray, square stone that has the outline of the country of Korea that includes a line showing where the 38th parallel is located. That line shows where the country is now split into North Korea and South Korea. It also lists how many soldiers were casualties, wounded, captured or missing during the war. It also includes a US Army Corps of Engineers castle and plaque commemorating the 2nd Engineer Battalion's participation and heavy losses during the Battle of Kunu-ri.

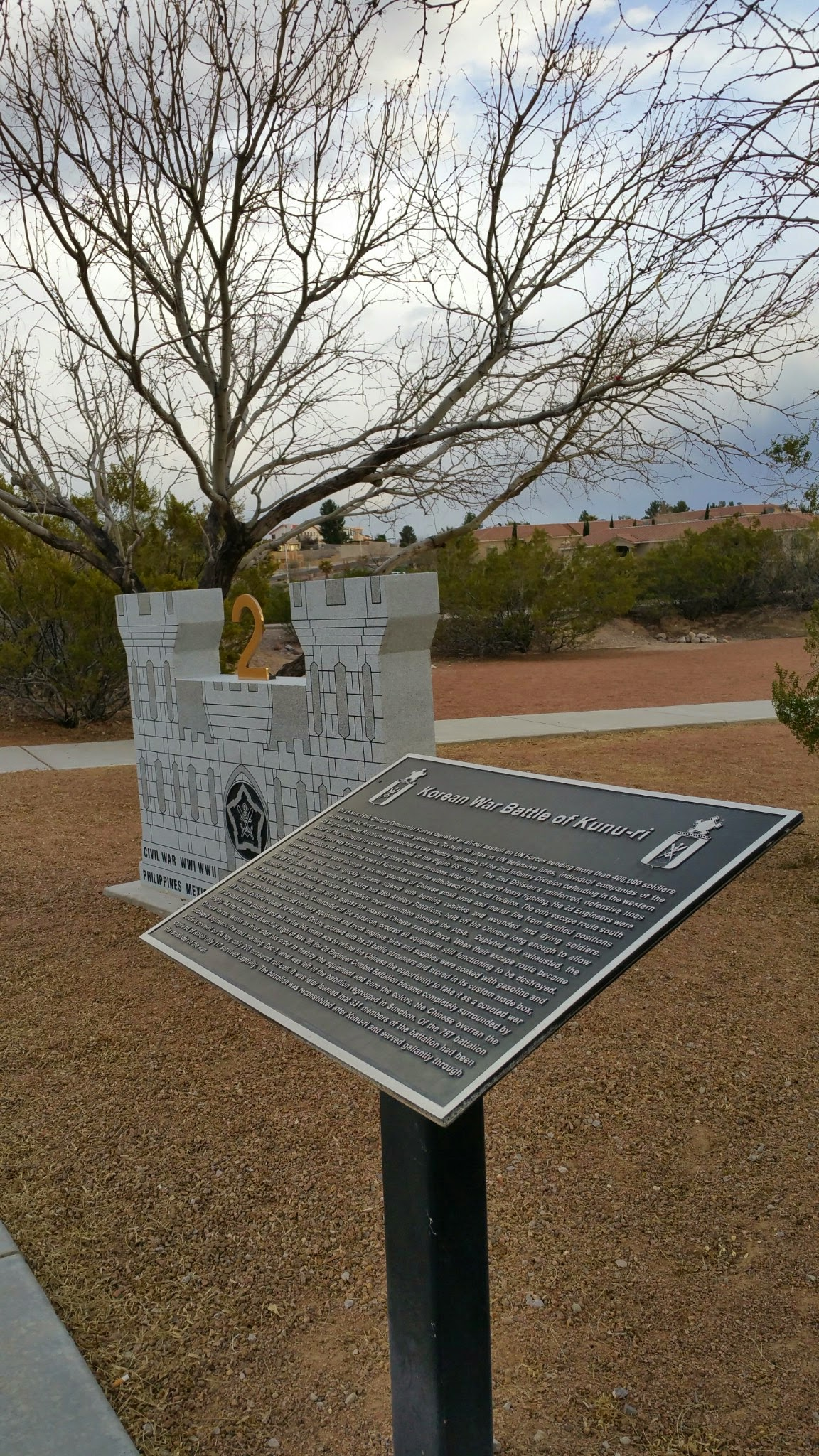
Korean War Memorial in Las Cruces, NM

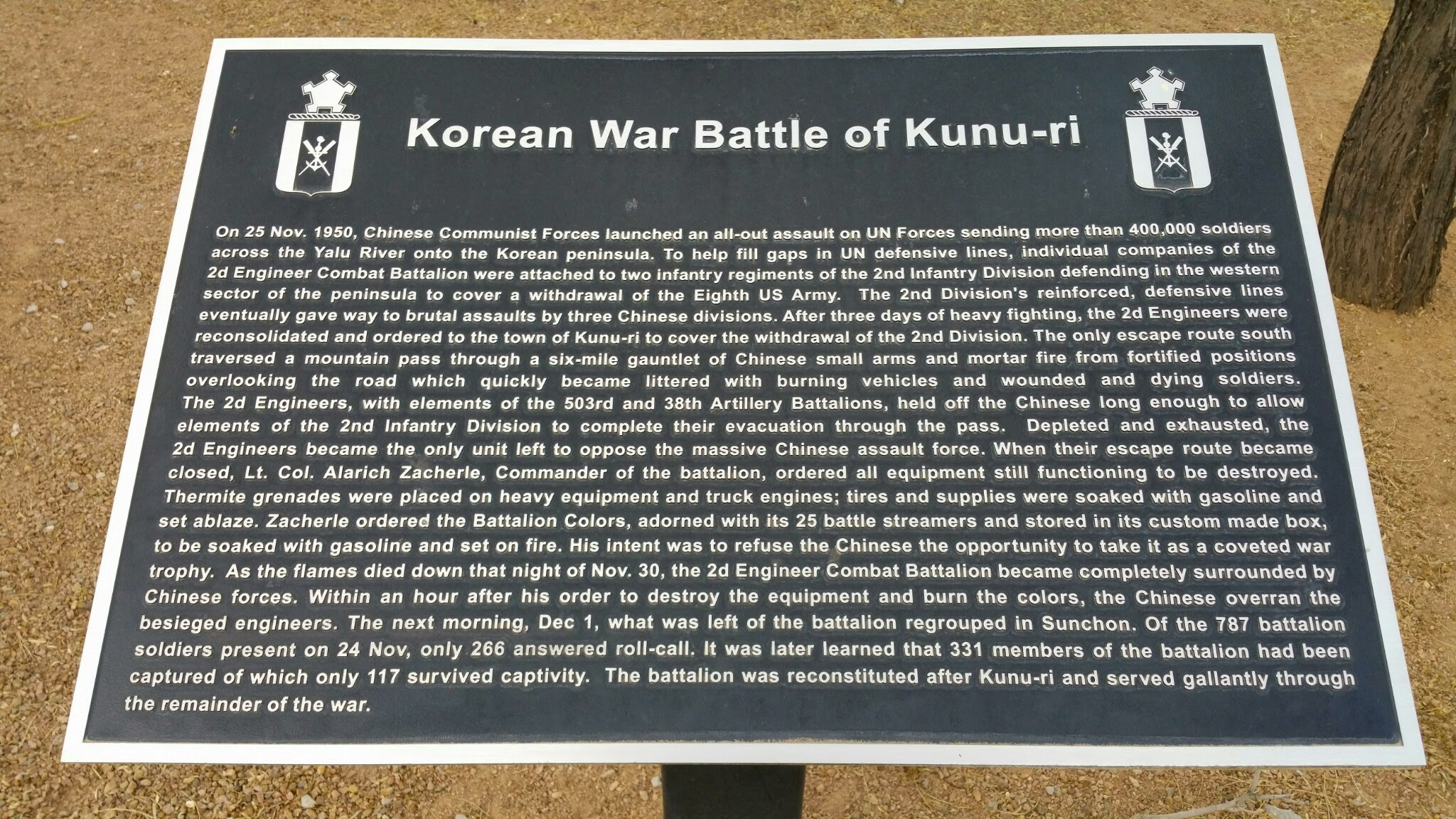
Plaque commemorating the Korean War Battle of Kunu-ri

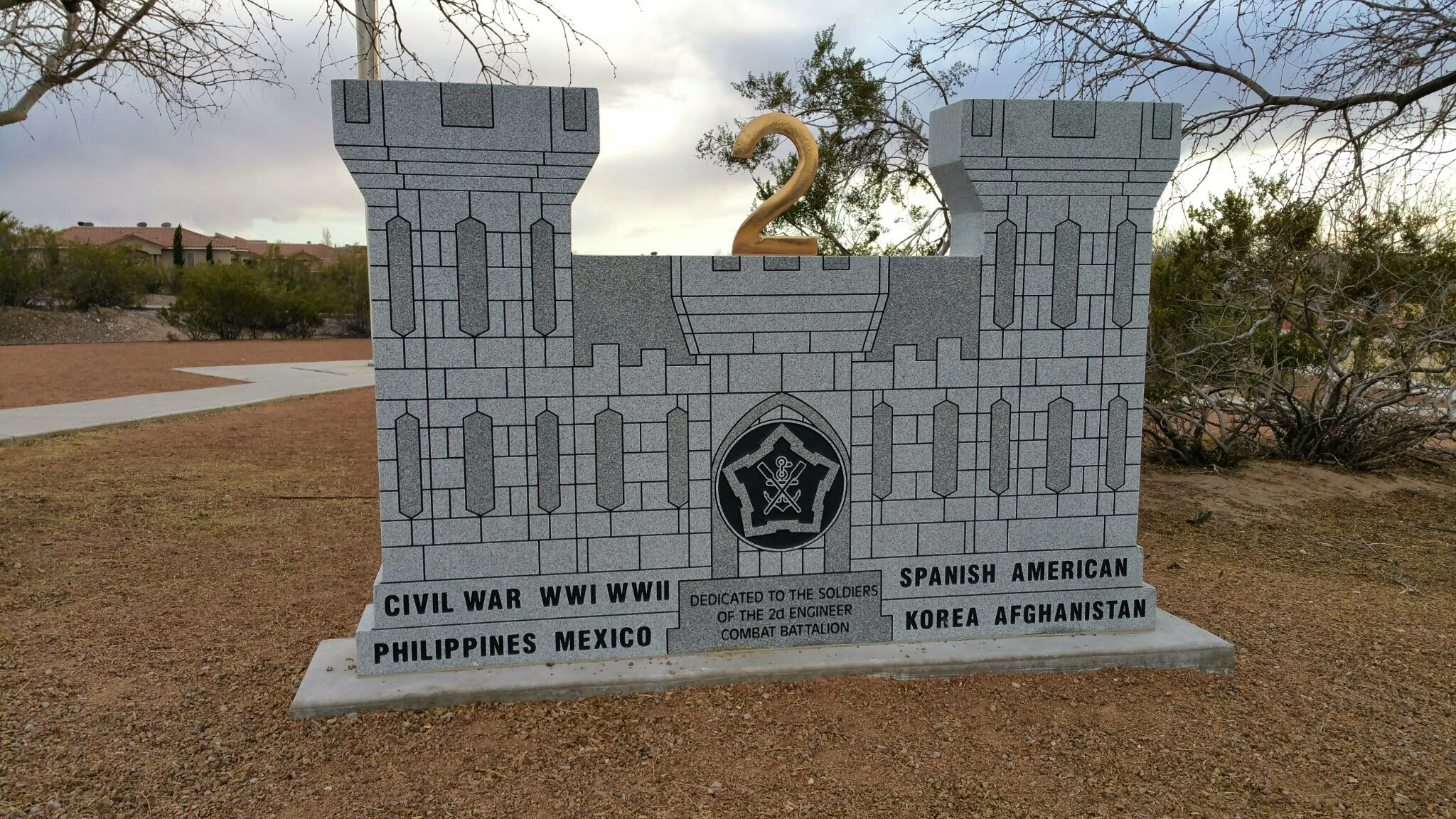
2nd Engineer Battalion Castle, Korean War Veteran Memorial, Las Cruces NM

Two coins were placed into the main stone memorial. They are special gold challenge coins. One coin is facing up and the other is facing down. This was in honor of Chaplain Emil J. Kapaun, CPT, US Army, 8th Cavalry Regiment, 1st Cavalry Division. He was awarded the Medal of Honor for his service to his country and fellow soldiers. He died in a Prisoner of War camp on May 23, 1951.

=== Marine Corps League Memorial ===
The Marine Corps League received a dedicated monument specifically to honor the Marines who have fought in previous wars and to those who continue to serve this day. The monument consists of an alloyed structure shaped in the Marine Corps emblem, referred to as the “Eagle, Globe, and Anchor.” Within this emblem, the Eagle represents the United States, with the Globe representing the area of responsibility the Marines will cover, and the fouled Anchor to express the aquatic function the Marines serve in junction with the Navy. The emblem is surrounded by some of the titles Marines have earned over the years including slang, such as “The Few The Proud, “Gung-ho,” and “Leather Neck” to name a few. Next to the monument are the words “Since 1775 Uncommon Valor has been a Common Virtue. United States Marines,” referring to the founding year of the Marine Corps.

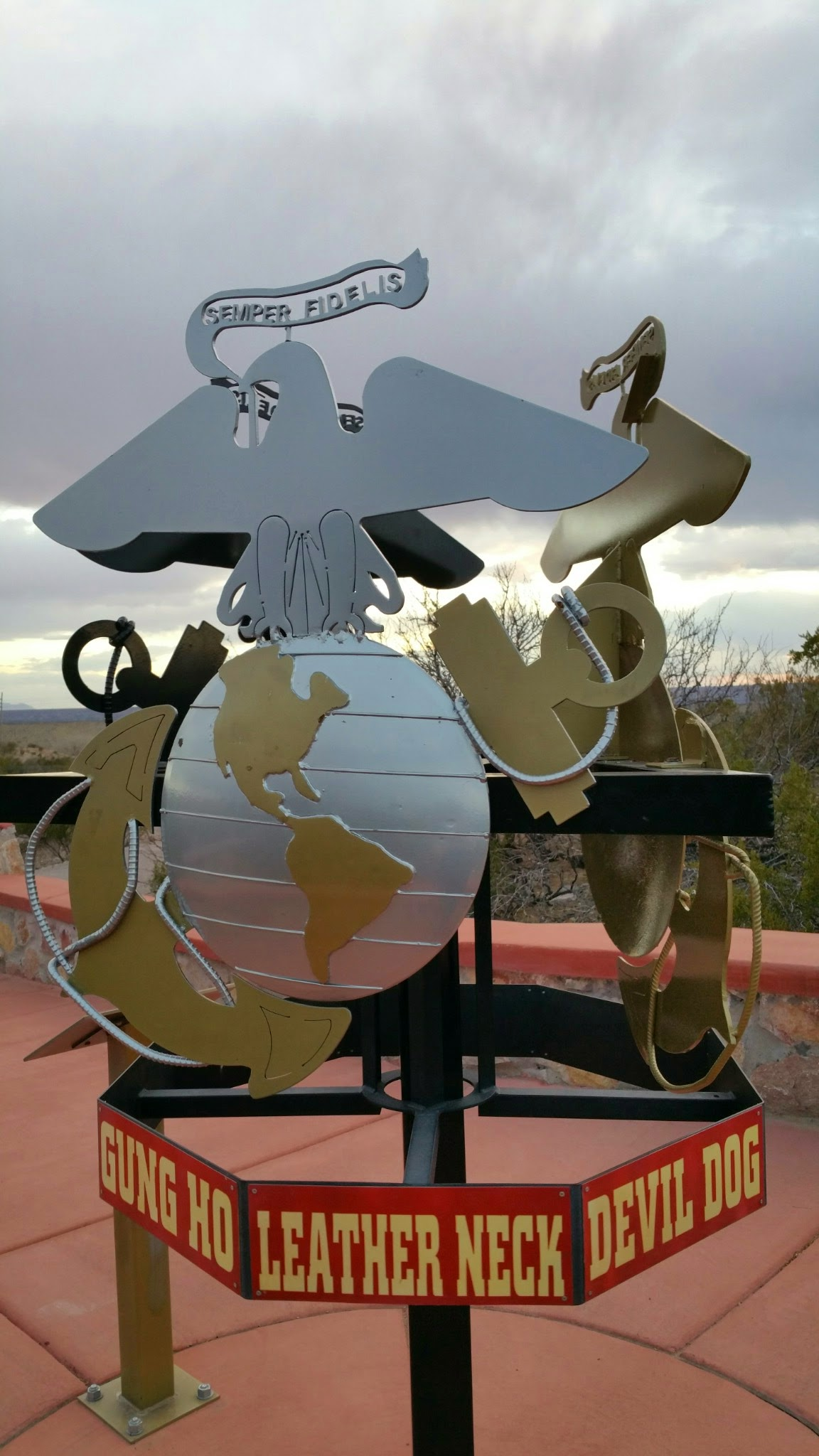
USMC spinning sculpture at the Las Cruces Veteran's Memorial Park.

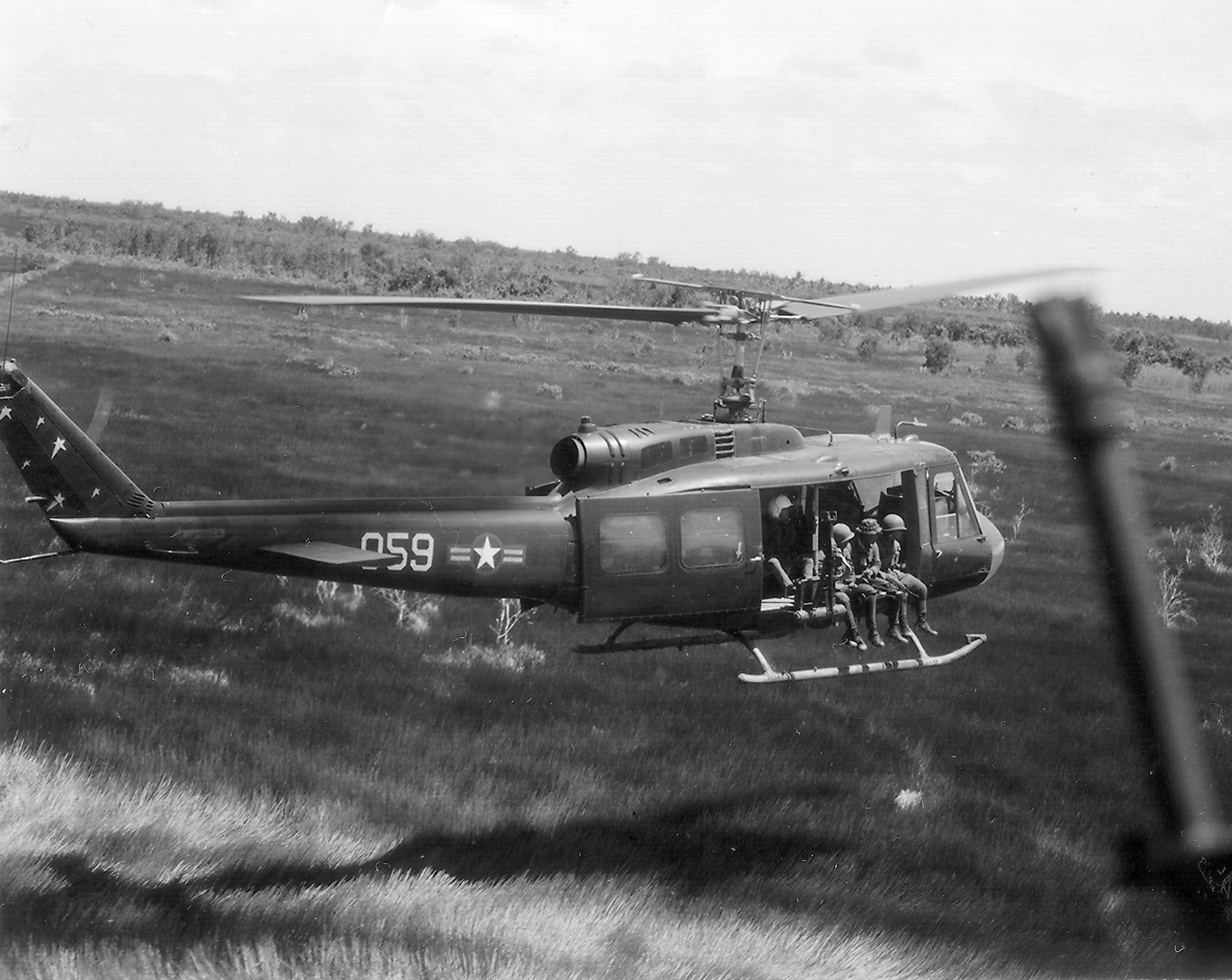
Bell UH-1 Iroquois helicopter in Vietnam War

=== Vietnam War Memorial ===
The Vietnam War memorial consists of a large wall that is entitled “Vietnam War Memorial: Heroes Never Thanked.” Below the title, is a collage of images of those who fought in the war from the New Mexico area. To the left and right of these images are placards that describe the advancements and roles of the different branches of military in this time period. Above this wall, hovers an original Vietnam-era Huey helicopter, positioned as if it is coming in for landing. This installment to the park was added on March 1, 2016.

=== Women Veterans Monument ===
The Women’s Veteran Monument located in Las Cruces, is the first monument in New Mexico that is dedicated to women in military service. It was dedicated on March 10, 2018. This monument features six different statues of women wearing uniforms from the military branches of the Air Force, Army, Coast Guard, Marines, National Guard, and the Navy. Each statue is life-size and made of bronze. The uniforms depicted on the statues are from different eras which include the Cold War, Korean War, Vietnam War, World War I, World War II and the modern era. This project was initiated by the United Military Women of the Southwest, which is a nonprofit organization of women military veterans that served in various branches of the military. The intent of this monument was to show the significant contributions that women have made throughout American military history.

== Incidents ==
In July 2018, the Bell UH-1 Iroquois helicopter that hovers over the Vietnam memorial was vandalized by two teens one night when they destroyed the windshield, a window, as well as the search light of the Red Cross helicopter, causing an estimated $20,000 worth of damage. Police apprehended the two individuals responsible. After the incident, City Parks Administrator Franco Granillo advocated for an increase in park security to ensure the protection of the people and the preservation of the monuments.

== Veterans Corner ==
Las Cruces is proud to be the home of thousands of men and women that have served our country through military service. In order to honor and help the veterans, family of veterans, or those interested in veterans issues the city has dedicated a section of their city’s website for these people. Veterans Corner is the section of the city’s website where people can go to find information and resources. Las Cruces has a Veterans Advisory Board that helps advise the city council on any affairs dealing with veterans. It is made up of 13 veterans that are currently living in the Doña Ana County. The Veterans Advisory Board is in charge of all physical changes and updates to the Veterans Memorial Park. The city also has a Veterans Corner Liaison that can be contacted for all questions connected to the veterans of Las Cruces, New Mexico.

== See also ==
- American Revolutionary War
- Bataan Death March
- Bell UH-1 Iroquis
- Cold War
- Korean War
- Las Cruces
- Memorials
- United States Air Force
- United States Army
- United States Marine Corps
- United States National Guard
- United States Navy
- Vietnam War
- War of 1812
- White Sands Missile Range
- Women in the military
- World War I
- World War II
