= 21st Field Artillery Regiment (PA) =

- Active: August 28, 1941 - April 9, 1942
- Countries: United States; Philippines
- Allegiance: United States Army; Army of the Philippines
- Branch: Army
- Type: Field Artillery
- Role: Reserve Unit
- Size: 1,500
- Part of: 21st Infantry Division
- Garrison/HQ: Camp O'Donnell, Tarlac
- Equipment: M1916 75mm Howitzers; QF 2.95inch Mountain Guns
- Engagements: Battle of Bataan; Battle of Lingayen

Commanders
- Notable commanders: Nemesio Catalan; Richard C. Mallonee (Senior Instructor)

21st Field Artillery Regiment, a unit of the 21st Infantry Division of the Philippine Army under the USAFFE, was mobilized on 18-November-1941, and was in action from December 1941 to 09-April-1942. The Division's area of responsibility covered La Union, Nueva Ecija, Tarlac and Pangasinan.

== Organization ==
The regiment was inducted to USAFFE in August 1941 and assigned to central Luzon. Training was on-going at Camp Del Pilar in Dau, Pampanga. Lieutenant Colonel Nemesio Catalan a former PC officer was selected to command but Lieutenant Colonel Richard C. Mallonee was assigned as an American senior instructor of the regiment.

1st Battalion was under the command of 1Lieutenant Pio B. Valdez, 2nd Battalion under 2Lieutenant Gregorio F. Mercado, and 3rd Battalion under 2Lieutenant Voltaire Acosta.

21st Division under Brigadier General Mateo Capinpin was ordered to moved to Lingayen Gulf to prevent any Japanese landings in the area. Japanese sensing the western coasts heavily defended eventually landed at the eastern coast of Lingayen Gulf in La Union which was lightly defended. 21st Field Artillery and other 21st Division units was ordered to withdraw south of Agno river to prepare for a defensive line.

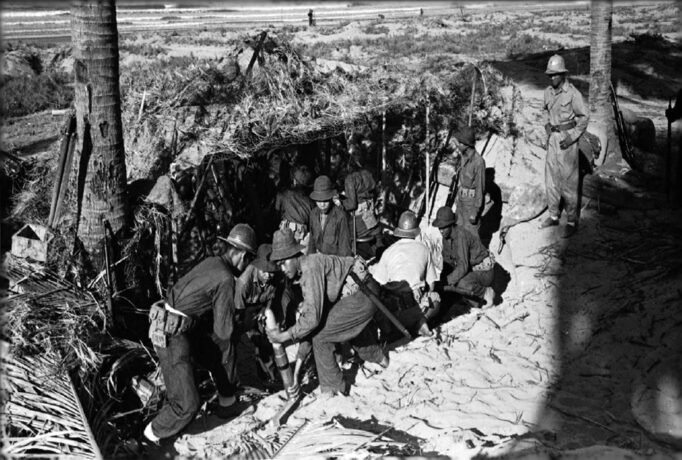
21st Field Artillery crew in action in Lingayen Gulf coast.

The North Luzon Force under Major General Jonathan Wainwright made a fighting withdrawal and delayed Japanese southward advance towards Manila. The 21st Division's Infantry regiments supported by 21st Field Artillery was very effective keeping Japanese from advancing rapidly. However, the Japanese landing in Lamon Bay gave the USAFFE a scare of South Luzon Force will cutoff activated War Plan Orange 3 effectively.

=== Retreat to Bataan ===
21st Division retreated and arrived in Bataan on January 3, 1942. Tired and hungry troops are immediately posted in the frontlines along Orani-Mauban Line at the II Corps sector. 21st Field Artillery provided fire support for 21st Division during Japanese assault to Mauban-Abucay line.

=== Surrender ===
On April 9, 1942, Major General Edward P. King Jr., surrendered his Luzon Force in Bataan. 21st Field Artillery surrendered in Lamao, Bataan and was assembled in Mariveles, Bataan. All troops went through Death March towards San Fernando, Pampanga. The regiment was not reactivated after the war.

== See also ==
- 21st Infantry Division, Philippine Army
