= Camp Gen. Mateo Capinpin =

Philippine military base in Tanay, Rizal

- Tanay, Rizal

Site information
- Type: Military base
- Controlled by: Philippines

Location
- Location within Luzon Location within Philippines
- Coordinates: 14°32′22″N 121°22′06″E

Site history
- Built: 1962

Camp Gen. Mateo Capinpin is a military camp used by the Armed Forces of the Philippines in barangay Sampaloc in Tanay, Rizal.

== History ==
The camp was established in 1962 for the first military exercises of the Southeast Asia Treaty Organization. It is named after Mateo Capinpin, a Filipino military officer and brigadier general who fought in the Battle of Bataan during the Second World War. It is currently the headquarters of the Philippine Army's 2nd Infantry Division, which is regarded as the AFP's primary anti-coup strike force because of its proximity to the capital Manila.

Former President Joseph Estrada was detained in the camp in 2003 during his trial on corruption charges before he was moved to his nearby private villa in 2004. The camp also housed dissident military officers detained for their role in an alleged coup plot against Estrada's successor as president, Gloria Macapagal-Arroyo, in 2006. Among those detained were Brigadier-General Danilo Lim and Colonel Ariel Querubin, who were later court-martialed there.

== Facilities ==
President Estrada's former detention quarters have been turned into a tourist attraction. The camp also hosts a museum, and offers camping, rock wall climbing and rappelling facilities, and tours on military and jungle life, in addition to a zipline and an obstacle course.
