= 21st Division (Philippines) =

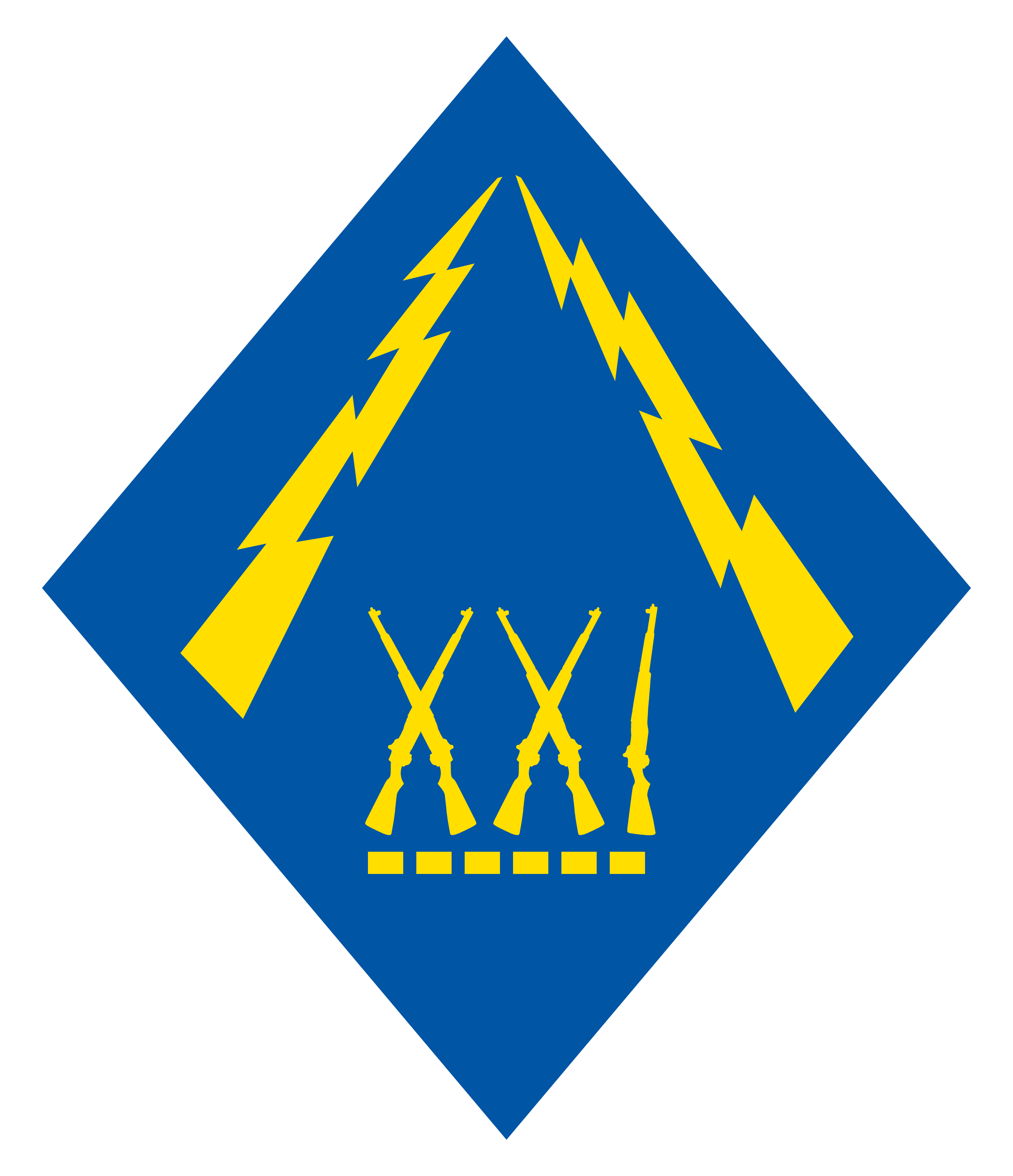
- 21st Philippine Division Emblem 1941-42
- Active: 1941 - 9 April 1942
- Country: Commonwealth of the Philippines
- Allegiance: United States Army; Philippine Commonwealth Army
- Branch: Army
- Type: Infantry Division
- Role: Army Reserve
- Size: 8,500
- Part of: North Luzon Force; I Philippine Corps
- Garrison/HQ: Camp Malatiqui, Santa Ignacia, Tarlac
- Engagements: World War II: Philippines campaign (1941–1942); Battle of Bataan

Commanders
- Commander: BGen Mateo M. Capinpin
- Senior Instructor: Col. Ray O'Day, USA
- Chief of Staff: LCol. Filomeno Villaluz; Col. Nemesio Catalan
- Notable commanders: Brigadier General Mateo M. Capinpin

The 21st Infantry Division was one of the 10 reserve division of the Philippine Army mobilized under the United States Army Forces in the Far East (USAFFE). The unit was involved in the delaying action against the Japanese invasion in the plains of Central Luzon, and the Battle of Bataan in 1942.

== History ==
=== Mobilization ===
When the Command and General Staff Course (CGSC) in Baguio was concluded on November 17, 1941, the Philippine Army was absorbed into the United States Army Forces in the Far East (USAFFE). The new graduates of the CGSC and the Philippine Scouts would form the backbone of the 10 divisions called up for the defense of Philippine Islands.

The 21st Division was mobilized on 18 November 1941 with Col. (later BGen.) Mateo "Mattie" M. Capinpin (PA) as the division commander, Col. Nemesio Catalan as his Chief-of-Staff, and Col. Ray M. O'Day as Senior Instructor. The rift between Filipino and American officers was evident, as Gen. Capinpin and Col. O'Day would have arguments about tactics and personal experiences. The area of mobilization by the 21st Division covers the provinces of Tarlac, Pangasinan, La Union, and Nueva Ecija. The initial cantonment was located in Camp Malatiqui in Sta. Ignacia, Tarlac.

=== Withdrawal from Pangasinan ===
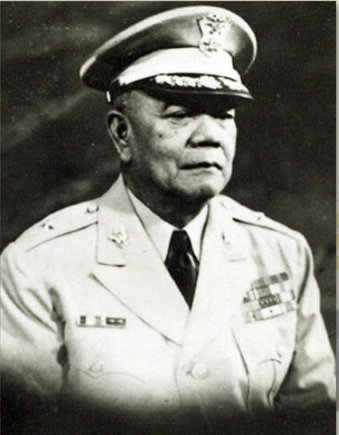
Division commander Brigadier General Mateo Capinpin.

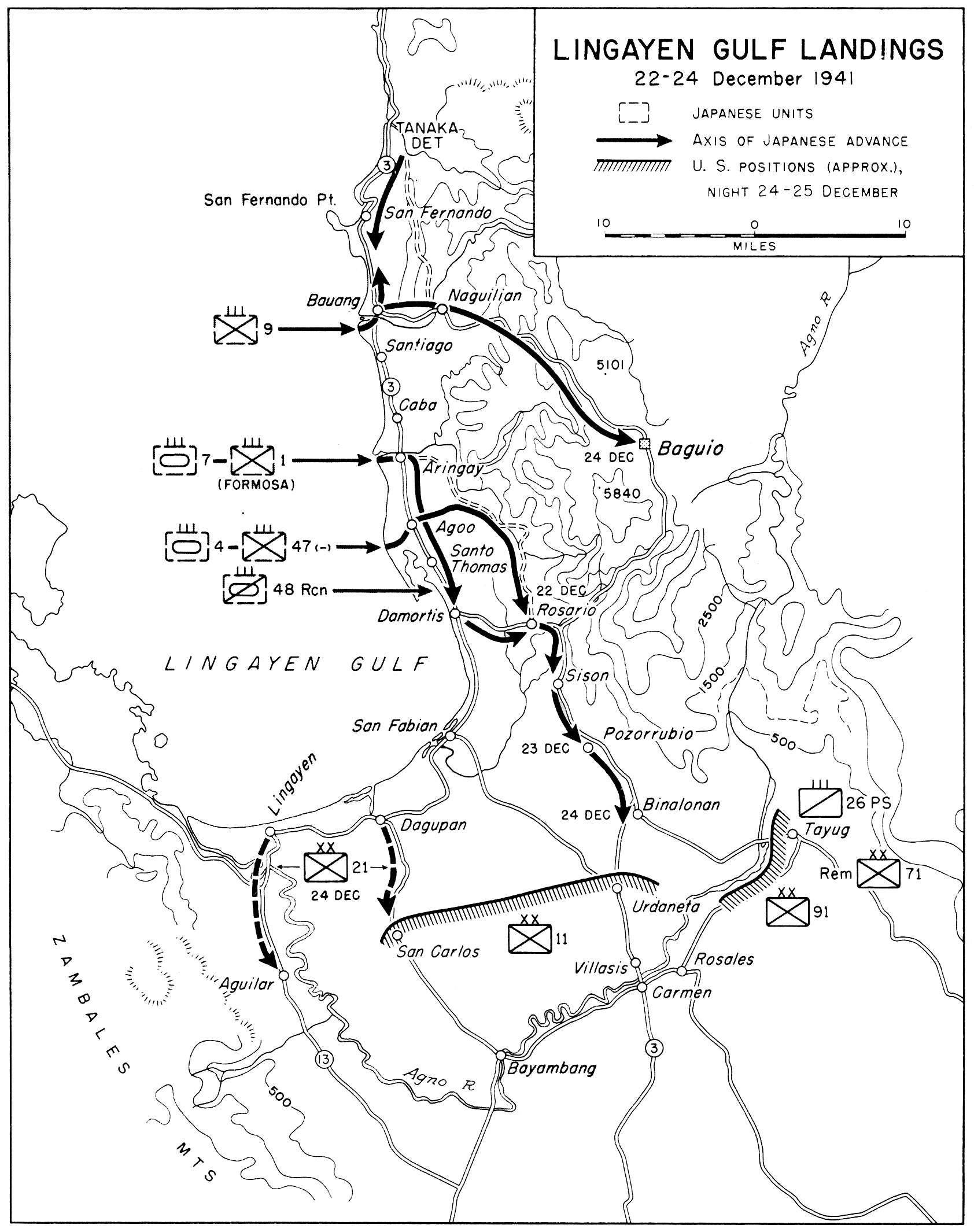
21st Division held the southern edges of Lingayen Gulf west of Dagupan.

Before Japanese units landed in Aparri and Vigan on December 10, 1941, the 21st Division under Gen. Jonathan Wainwright's Northern Luzon Force were instructed to dig in and hold the southern shores of Lingayen Gulf. Gen. Capinpin's 3 regiments found themselves covering a tight front from Lingayen town to Dagupan. Gen. Douglas MacArthur understood that Lingayen Gulf would be the best option to land an amphibious force that would attack Manila. However, on December 22 at 0500 hrs he was surprised as the bulk of the invasion force consisting of the IJA 14th Area Army under Gen. Masaharu Homma landed in the eastern shores of Lingayen Gulf, avoiding the formation of the 21st Division, and focused on the fishing village of Agoo, La Union.

The Japanese axis of advance would concentrate on Highway 3 which runs down from Agoo to Binalonan, Urdaneta, Tarlac, and Fort Stotsenburg. Given this, much of the Japanese advance was absorbed by the 11th Division, 91st Division, and the 26th Cavalry Regiment of the Philippine Scouts. The 21st Division was tasked to protect the left flank or western end of the front along Highway 13 which connects to Highway 3 at Tarlac, with the 11th and 91st as the main body, and the 26th Cavalry riding on the right wing of the defense.

=== Wainwright Delaying Lines ===
However, no sooner have the Japanese landed, Gen. Douglas MacArthur activated War Plan Orange - 3, and this called for units to conduct a strategic retreat of all United States Army Forces in the Far East (USAFFE) units on Luzon to Bataan to deny an invading force, in this case the Japanese Imperial Army and Navy, access to Manila Bay. Gen. Wainwright strung five delaying lines across the plains of Central Luzon, which would be utilized over the course of two weeks.

The 21st Division fell back to the Defensive Line D-1 on December 24, covering the area stretching from Aguilar to San Carlos in western Pangasinan.

The IJA 14th Area Army advances along Highway 3 forced the US and Filipino forces to fall back to Defensive Line D-2 by December 26. The 21st Division would continue to cover the left flank of the Northern Luzon Force at Camiling, Tarlac. The IJA 9th Infantry Regiment was able to exploit the gap between the 11th Division and 91st Division at Carmen, Pangasinan, forcing Wainwright for another retreat to the Defensive Line D-3. The following day, the 21st Division would station themselves in their original cantonment at Sta. Ignacia and Gerona, Tarlac, with the 11th Division on its right wing at Guimba, Nueva Ecija.

Knowing that Tarlac would be a major junction, Gen. Homma knew he had to capture this strategic point. The Northern Luzon Force would once more withdraw, this time to Defensive Line D-4 by December 30. The 21st Division would retreat along the road towards Bamban, where it would continue to provide fierce resistance and delay the Japanese advance.

By December 31, the US and Filipino forces would move back to Defensive Line D-5 following the Bamban River (currently known as Sacobia River). The 21st Division would find themselves in Fort Stotsenburg with the 11th Division on its right wing at Magalang.

=== Guagua-Porac Line ===
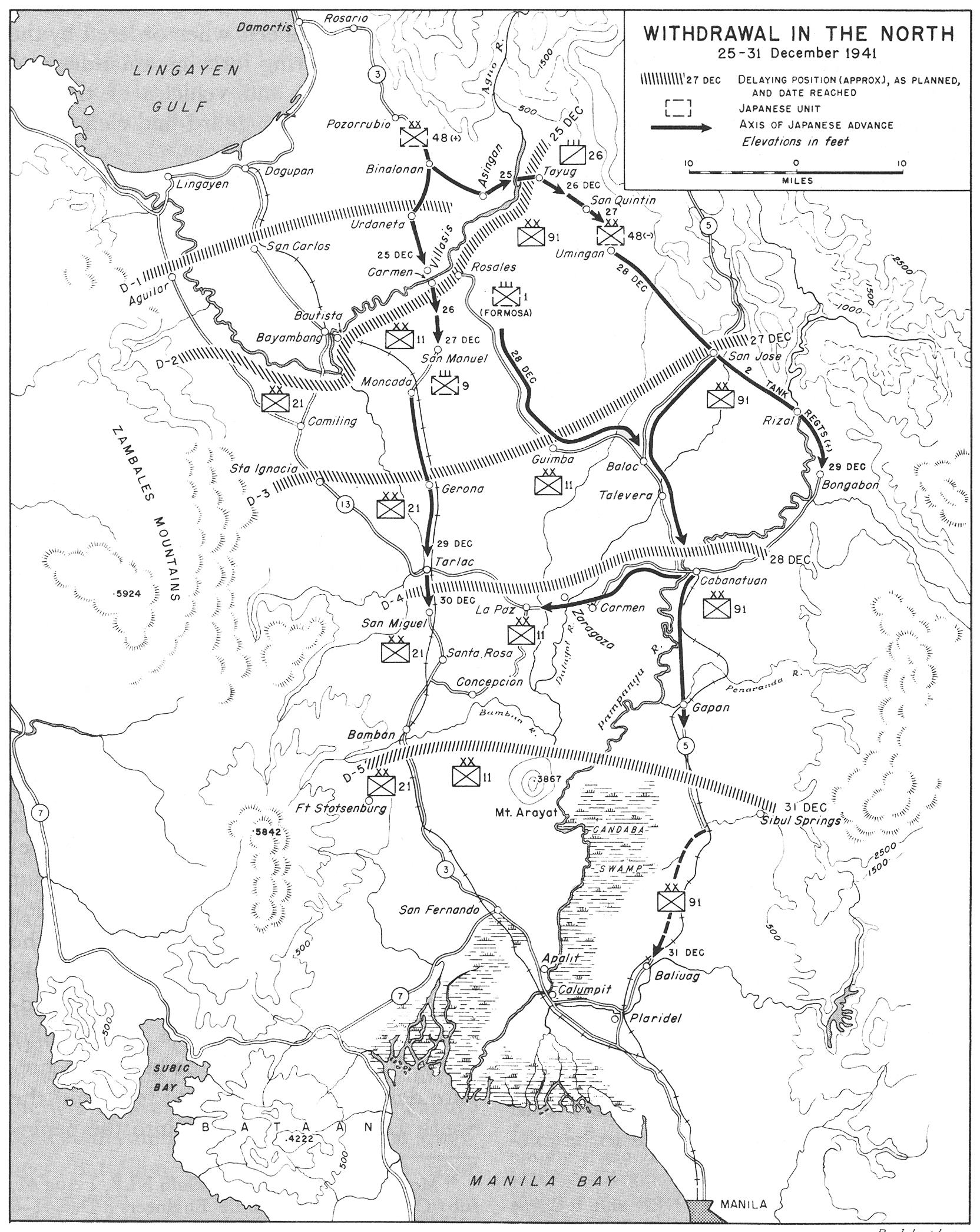
5 Defensive Lines of Gen. Wainwright for War Plan Orange - 3

Understanding that all forces withdrawing into Bataan would mean congestion at the Layac Junction in Dinalupihan, Gen. Wainwright needed to buy time especially for the Southern Luzon Forces under Gen. George M. Parker. Thus the Guagua-Porac Line would play a critical role, where the 21st Division and 11th Division would have to provide delaying action against the Japanese advances. The Guagua-Porac line stretches around 16 kilometers on a north-west to south-east line, with the having the steep Zambales Mountain Range on the left, and the right would be the Candaba Swamp. The 21st Division would once more cover the left flank, 11th would be on the right, while remnants of the 26th Cavalry Regiment of the Philippine Scout and 192nd Tank Battalion under Maj. George N. Smythe would be designated as reserves behind the two main divisions at San Jose.

Despite having the terrain to their advantage, the US and Filipino forces felt insecure given some units have only had a few weeks to train. It did not help that initial intelligence assessment outlined that both divisions were facing 120,000 Japanese units which had combat experience from the Second Sino-Japanese War. In reality, Gen. Homma only had half of that number, and some units were also tasting their first combat experience.

Gen. Capinpin committed the 21st Infantry Regiment under Lt. Col. Valentin Velasco on the left flank at Porac covering Highway 74, while the 22nd Infantry Regiment under Lt. Col. Liberador Littaua would hold the right flank of the divisional lines at Santa Rita. The 23rd Infantry Regiment under Maj. Jose Agdamag was held in reserve 5 miles behind divisional lines. The 21st Field Artillery Regiment under Divisional Chief-of-Staff, Lt. Col. Nemesio Catalan, positioned behind the 21st Infantry Regiment's reserve 3rd Battalion, was to play a crucial role the following night.

From his headquarters in Cabanatuan, Gen. Homma instructed a major assault against the Guagua-Porac Line on January 1, 1942. The Japanese initially sent a probing force from their 9th Detachment the following day, and from the initial skirmish they realized the weakness between the 21st and 22nd regimental lines. The 23rd Infantry Regiment in reserve was able to blunt the probing attack, and by night time the general staff were planning for a counter-attack. That evening, the Takahashi Detachment's named after its commanding officer Lt. Col. Katsumi Takahashi, would muster a force greater than the 9th Detachment at Bamban and march towards Porac with the 8th Field Heavy Artillery Regiment.

The situation was also exacerbated by spies and local fifth columnist who exposed the locations of the 21st and 11th division units and supply dumps by firing flares into the night of 2 January. Japanese forces took note and the following day air units bombed these locations. Intelligence officers from both divisions were able to catch the spies and summarily sentenced to death.

The following day, on 3 January, the 23rd Infantry Regiment moved into position to fill in the gap between the 21st and 22nd and was met with artillery fire and bombing and strafing from enemy air squadrons. This forced the 23rd to pull back. The news reached Gen. Wainwright who ordered Gen. Capinpin "hold the line or die where you are!"

Gen. Capinpin launched a counterattack but the Japanese infantry supported by heavy artillery and dive bombers was able to push back. By noon time the Japanese were able to open a gap between the 21st and 22nd. Col. Takahashi's advance collapsed the defense of the 21st Infantry Regiment, and Col. Velasco and his regimental staff almost getting captured. The 194th Tank Battalion which was supporting the 11th Division on the right flank was called in for support. However, the battalion couldn't move until they received permission from the regimental tank commander, Col. James R.N. Weaver. The 21st Division's position was only saved by the unrelenting actions of the 21st Field Artillery Regiment under Col. Catalan and Col. Mallonee.

The 1st Battalion of the 21st Field Artillery covered the gap between the 21st and 22nd Infantry Regiment, firing almost at point blank of 600–800 meters at the advancing Japanese forces. While the 2nd and 3rd Battalions were providing direct fire against the assault at Pio. The artillery exchanges lasted for 6 hours and would to that date be recorded as the heaviest artillery engagement during the campaign. The Japanese withdraw from the Guagua-Porac Line and reorganized in Fort Stotsenburg.

During the night of 4 January Gen. Wainwright ordered the 21st to fall back to the next line of defense at Gumain River.

The delaying actions of the 21st Division allowed most of the USAFFE units to fall back into Bataan, and strengthen the Olongapo-Dinalupihan line and later on the Morong-Abucay Line.

Upon the full retreat of the 21st Division, it was given assignment as reserves by the II Corps.

=== Battle of Bataan ===
21st Infantry Division is one of the main combat unit of I Philippine Corps under General Wainwright. They fought on different defensive lines until casualties are mounting up to point the division was only down to only 1 infantry regiment able to fight. Also shortage of ammunitions made soldiers unable to fight.

=== Fall of Bataan ===
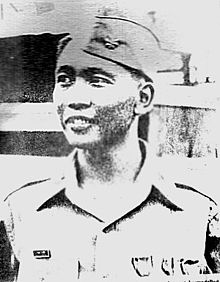
Then Lieutenant Ferdinand Marcos assigned as Intelligence Officer under division G2.

Major General Edward P. King Jr., the commander of Luzon Force in Bataan surrendered his battered, hungry, and sick troops on April 9, 1942 to prevent more death. This effectively put all forces including 21st Infantry Division in captivity and forcefully walked under the heat of the sun without food and water from Mariveles, Bataan to San Fernando, Pampanga causing more death of starvation and other who are not able to walk are bayoneted to death or shot. Reaching San Fernando they were cramped to a train to bring them to Camp O'Donnell in Tarlac. More casualties are recorded in Camp O'Donnell as the situation isn't helpful and no medicines are available.

== Order of battle ==
21st Division
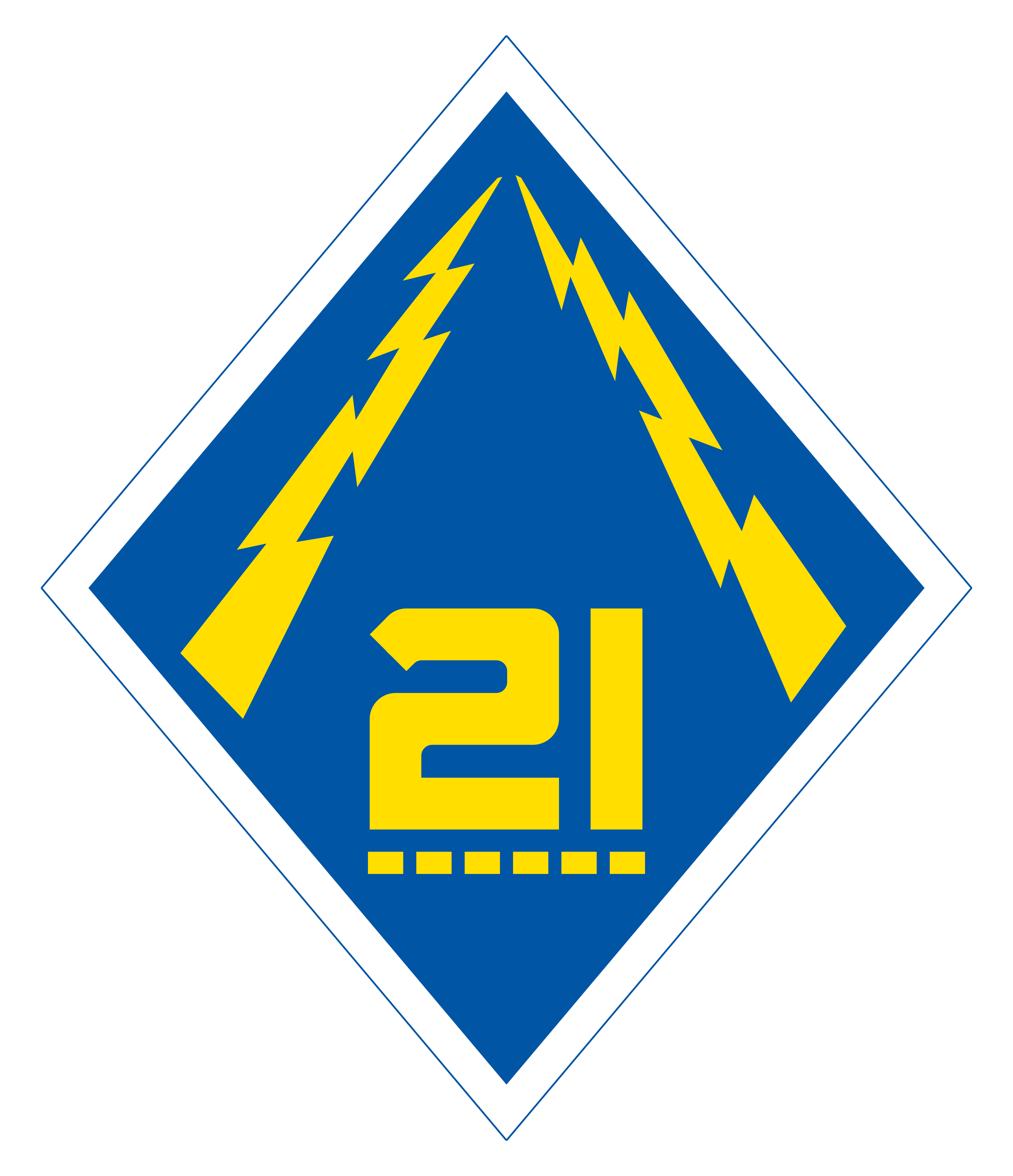
- 21st Philippine Division Emblem 1941-42, more common version
- Branch: Philippine Army

The 21st Division's order of battle as of December 8, 1941: Commanding General: BGen. Mateo M. Capinpin, PA

Senior Military Instructor: Col. Ray O'Day, USA

- Chief-of-Staff: Col. Filomeno B. Villaluz / Col. William A. Wappenstein
  - G-1: Capt. Antonio Torres
  - G-2: Capt. Ismael Lapuz
  - G-3: Capt. Francisco Luna
  - G-4: Capt. Mariano Tanwangco
  - Adjutant: Maj. Aurelio Lucero
- 21st Infantry Regiment (PA)
  - CO: Lt. Col. Melanio Velasco
  - Ex-O: Capt. Erasmo Batongmalaque
  - 1st Battalion: Major Robert Besson, USA
  - 2nd Battalion:
    - Chief Instructor: Capt. Philip A. Meier, USA
  - 3rd Battalion
- 22nd Infantry Regiment (PA)
  - CO: Lt. Col. Joaquin D. Esperitu
  - Ex-O: Capt. Joaquin Timoteo
- 23rd Infantry Regiment (PA)
  - CO:
    - Lt. Col. Liberato Littaua
    - Major Jose Agdamag, PA
  - Ex-O: Capt. Leopoldo Santos
  - (2/23 Hvy. Wpns. Co. C.O.: 1Lt. Avelino J. Battad)
  - 3rd Battalion: Major Charles A. McLaughlin, USA
- 21st Field Artillery Regiment (PA)
  - CO: Lt. Col. Nemesio Catalan
  - Ex-O: Capt. Luis Villareal
  - Adviser: Col. Richard C. Mallonee
  - 21st FA Regt HQ Company (PA)
  - 1st Bn/21st FA Regt (PA) (75mm guns, 16x)
  - 2nd Bn/21st FA Regt (PA) (2.95-inch pack howitzers, 4x)
  - 3rd Bn/21st FA Regt (PA)
    - Instructor: 1Lt. Carl J. Savoie, USA
- 21st Engineer Battalion (PA)
- 21st Division Units (PA)
  - 21st Division Headquarters & HQ Company (PA)
  - 21st Medical Battalion (PA)
  - 21st Signal Company (PA)
  - 21st Quartermaster Company (Motorized) (PA)
  - 21st QM Transport Company (Truck) (PA)

== Notable members ==
- Ferdinand E. Marcos, became the 10th President of the Philippines from 1965 to 1986. Commissioned 3Lt assigned in G2 Intelligence section.
- Mateo Capinpin, Commander of the division from its mobilization to its surrender. Became Adjutant General of AFP after the war.
- Ismael Lapuz, became commanding general Philippine Army and later AFP Vice Chief of Staff.
- Luis Villa-real, became AFP Vice chief of staff during Marcos administration and Director General of NICA under Corazon Aquino administration.
- Artemio Vergel de Dios, Founder of JCI Philippines formerly Philippine Jaycees and JCI Manila formerly Manila Jaycees

== Sources ==
- Morton, Louis (1953). United States Army in World War II, The War in the Pacific: The Fall of the Philippines. Washington, D.C.: Center of Military History, United States Army.
- Whitman, John W. (1990). Bataan: Our Last Ditch : The Bataan Campaign, 1942. Hippocrene Books. ISBN 0-87052-877-7.
- Morton, Louis. The Fall of the Philippines (Publication 5-2) . Retrieved on 14 Feb 2017.
