= Lewis C. Beebe =

United States Army general

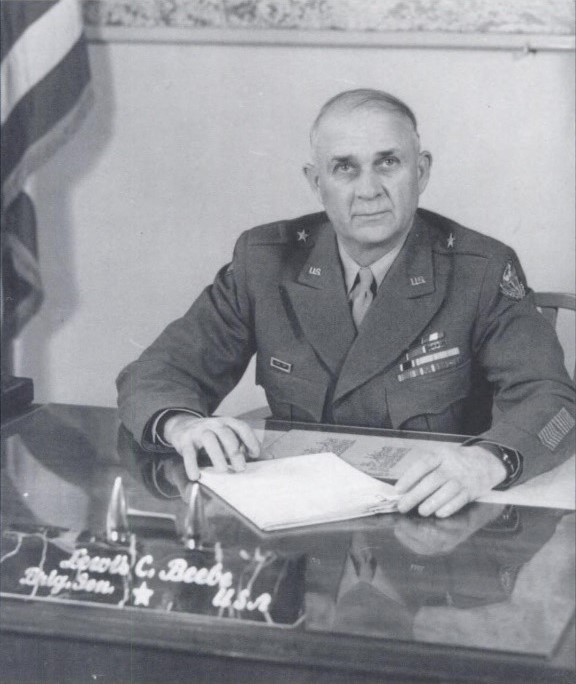
- Born: December 7, 1891; Ashton, Iowa, U.S.
- Died: February 17, 1951 (aged 59); Faribault, Minnesota, U.S.
- Burial place: Arlington National Cemetery
- Military career
- Allegiance: United States of America
- Branch: Oregon National Guard; United States Army
- Service years: 1913–1914, 1916–1950
- Rank: Brigadier General
- Units: 30th Infantry Regiment; 57th Infantry Regiment; Fourth United States Army
- Conflicts: World War I; Champagne-Marne; Aisne-Marne; St. Mihiel; Meuse-Argonne; World War II; Battle of Bataan
- Awards: Distinguished Service Cross; Distinguished Service Medal; Purple Heart; Croix de Guerre

Lewis Charles Beebe (December 7, 1891 – February 17, 1951) was an American brigadier general. Beebe was Chief of Staff of U.S. Forces under General Jonathan Wainwright during World War II. He had previously been an assistant chief of staff under General Douglas MacArthur.

Beebe was an enlisted soldier from March 1913 until February 1914. He then enlisted in the Oregon National Guard in April 1916 and was commissioned as a second lieutenant of coast artillery in September 1916 after graduating from the University of Oregon. Beebe subsequently accepted a commission as a second lieutenant of infantry in the Regular Army in November 1917. During World War I, he served as a temporary captain with the 30th Infantry Regiment, 3rd Division in France, earning the Distinguished Service Cross and a Purple Heart.

Beebe graduated from the Command and General Staff School in 1932 and the Army War College in 1939. He was promoted to major in August 1935 and lieutenant colonel in July 1940.

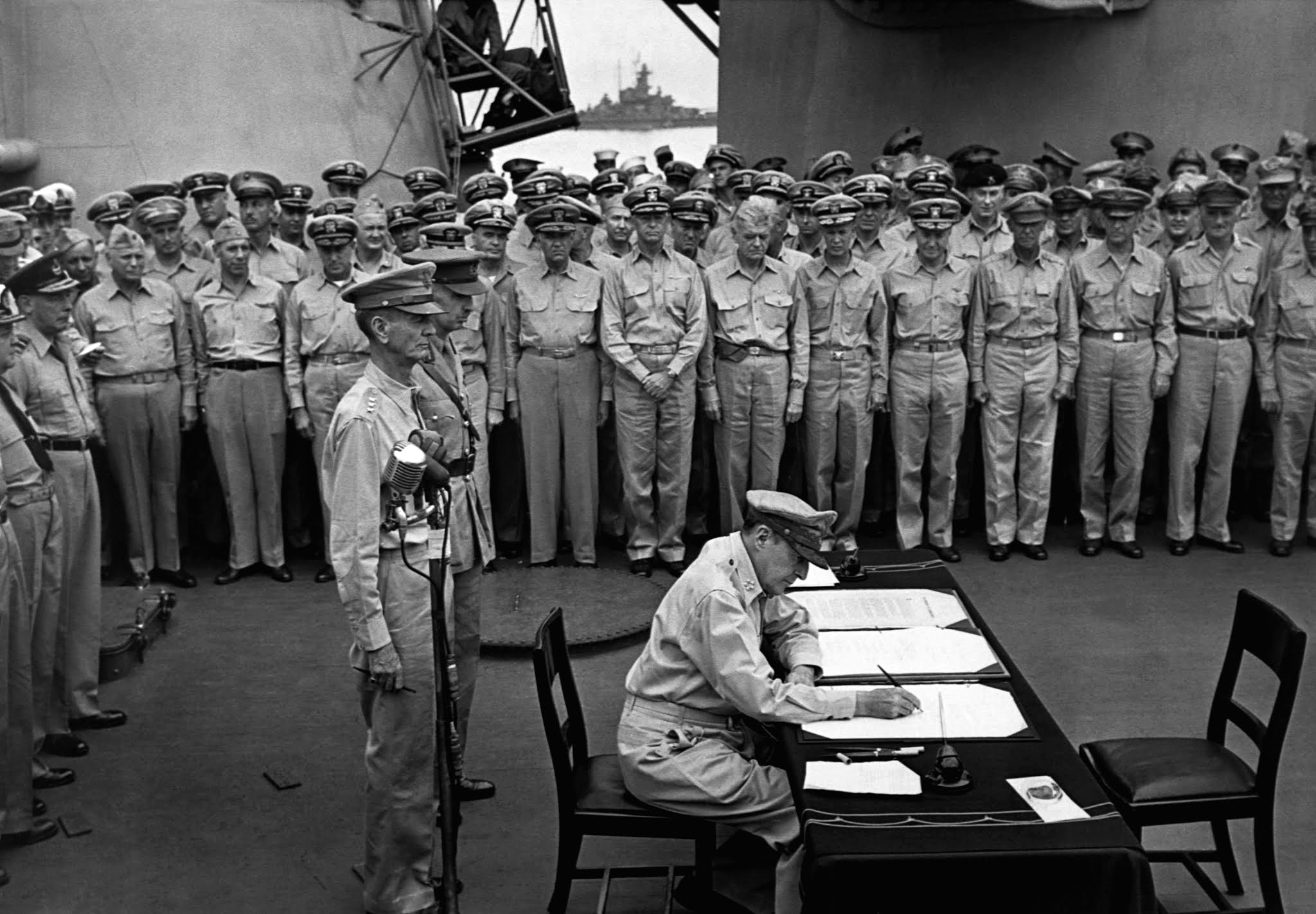
Allied sailors and officers watch Douglas MacArthur sign documents during the surrender ceremony aboard the USS Missouri on September 2, 1945. Beebe is in the second row, third from the right.

Sent to the Philippines, Beebe received temporary promotions to colonel in December 1941 where he served as Supply Officer G4 of USAFFE and brigadier general in March 1942 as Assistant Chief of Staff of General Douglas MacArthur as representative in the Philippines. Major General Jonathan M. Wainwright IV as the most senior officer in the Philippines was promoted to lieutenant general and assumed the command US Forces in the Philippines (USFIP) covering both Army and Navy forces in the Philippines. General Wainwright made General Beebe as his chief of staff until their surrender in Corregidor island in May 1942. After surrendering to Japanese forces, he spent over three years as a prisoner of war in Manchuria and was rescued by OSS in 1945.

Beebe served in Texas and West Germany after the war. His wartime promotion to brigadier general was made permanent in January 1948. He retired from active duty on September 30, 1950.

Beebe suffered a cerebral hemorrhage and died at his home in Faribault, Minnesota on February 17, 1951. He was buried at Arlington National Cemetery six days later.

== See also ==
- Philippines campaign (1941–1942)
