= Frank Adamo =

American military physician

- Born: 1893; Tampa, Florida
- Died: 1988 (aged 94–95)
- Military career
- Allegiance: United States
- Branch: United States Army
- Rank: Lieutenant colonel
- Conflicts: World War II
- Awards: Legion of Merit

Frank Adamo (1893–1988) was an American doctor honored for his medical service during World War II. He rose to the rank of lieutenant colonel and was awarded a Legion of Merit medal for his service.

Adamo was born and raised in Tampa, Florida. As a pre-teen, he went to work rolling cigars. After the cigar strike of 1910, he moved to Chicago and resumed his schooling, eventually enrolling at the Chicago College of Medicine and Surgery. He returned to Tampa in 1919 for his internship and joined the Army Reserve in 1923.

Adamo went on active duty in 1940 and served in the Philippines as a surgeon. After the Japanese attack on Bataan, Adamo went to Corregidor, where he treated many casualties. Many patients suffered from gangrene. Amputation was the accepted treatment, but Adamo knew that the gangrene bacillus could not survive if exposed to oxygen, so he tried opening the wounds and applying sulfa drugs, irrigating hourly with hydrogen peroxide. The innovative treatment was effective, and Adamo was credited with saving many lives and limbs. Life Magazine called him "Bataan's medical hero."

Adamo was taken prisoner after the fall of Corregidor. As a prison camp physician, he treated diseases and conditions such as beriberi, dengue fever, dysentery, malaria, and malnutrition. In his book P.O.W. in the Pacific: Memoirs of an American Doctor in World War II, Dr. William N. Donovan credits Adamo for saving his life.

Adamo was liberated in 1945, and returned home later that year. Tampa celebrated "Frank Adamo Day" on April 27 with a parade. He has a street named after him, Adamo Drive, a 7-mile section of State Road 60 connecting the Channelside District of downtown Tampa and South Falkenburg Road on the western edge of Brandon. He returned to private practice as a surgeon, and was for a time the president of the county medical association. He was honored in 1960 with a trophy as the "Most Popular Doctor" at a local hospital. Adamo retired in 1973, at the age of 80.
