= Mateo M. Capinpin =

Brigadier general in the Philippines Army

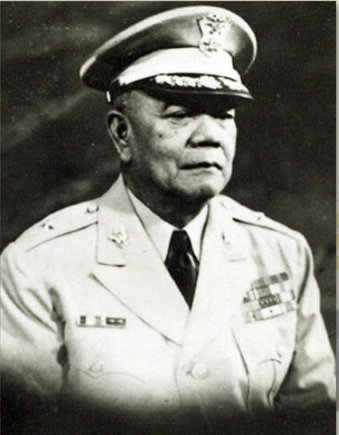
- Born: April 22, 1887; Morong, Morong, Captaincy General of the Philippines
- Died: December 28, 1958 (aged 71); Biñan, Laguna, Philippines
- Burial place: Municipal Cemetery, Biñan
- Military career
- Allegiance: Philippines; United States
- Branch: United States Army; Philippine Army
- Service years: 1906–1948
- Rank: Major General
- Nickname: Mattie
- Units: 21st Infantry Division (PA); Philippine Scouts
- Commands: 21st Division (Philippines); 45th Infantry Regiment (PS)
- Conflicts: Battle of Bataan
- Awards: Distinguished Conduct Star
- Memorials: Camp Mateo Capinpin

Mateo Mananjaya "Mattie" Capinpin (April 22, 1887 – December 28, 1958) was a brigadier general in the Philippine Army and commanded the 21st Division (Philippines) under the United States Army Forces in the Far East during the Battle of Bataan.

== Early years and education ==
Mateo Capinpin was born on 22 April 1887 in Morong, Rizal. He took up his elementary and secondary studies in the Laguna High School. Upon graduation he joined the Philippine Scouts, where at the age of 24 he became the youngest First Sergeant. He rose the ranks and later earned a commission and would take command of the 45th Infantry Regiment (PS). Further studies brought him to United States Army Infantry School in Fort Benning, Georgia in 1920.

Maj. Capinpin retired from the Philippine Scouts to join the newly formed Philippine Army in 1936.

== World War II ==
As the situation with Japan was degrading, war planners understood that a war between Japan and the United States would lead to conflict in the Philippines. General Douglas MacArthur accelerated the mobilization efforts to bring the Philippine Army numbers to 120,000, in ten divisions. By September 1941, the senior officers undertook the Command and General Staff Course (CGSC) in Baguio, which was concluded on November 17, 1941. The Philippine Army was absorbed into the United States Army Forces in the Far East (USAFFE). The new graduates of the CGSC and the Philippine Scouts would form the backbone of the ten divisions called up for the defense of Philippine Islands.

Col. Capinpin was put in command of the 21st Division on 18 November 1941. The area of mobilization for the 21st Division covered the provinces of Tarlac, Pangasinan, La Union, and Nueva Ecija. The initial cantonment was located in Camp Malatiqui in Sta. Ignacia, Tarlac.

On December 20, Capinpin and all division commanders under the USAFFE with a rank of colonel were promoted to brigadier general.

World War II broke out when Imperial Japanese Army bombers raided Baguio, Fort Stotsenburg, and Iba on December 8. By December 10 the Japanese began their landings in Aparri, and succeeded by landings in Lingayen Gulf. While it was predicted that the bulk of the Japanese invading force would land in Lingayen Gulf, the 14th Area Army focused on the eastern shores at Agoo, La Union. BGen. Capinpin's 21st Division was assigned to the southern shores of the gulf from Lingayen town to Dagupan.

The 21st Division was ordered by Gen. Jonathan Wainwright by January 2 to hold the Guagua-Porac Line south of Fort Stotsenburg to delay the Japanese advances as the United States Army Forces in the Far East (USAFFE) units were retreating towards Bataan. Despite the lack of training, Capinpin's two battalions held the line along with units from the 11th Division. However, the Japanese realized the weakness between the lines and took advantage of this. The Takahashi Detachment's attack was stalled by artillery fire. During the night of January 4 Gen. Wainwright ordered the 21st to fall back to the next line of defense at Gumain River.

On 5 April, during the Battle of Bataan, Capinpin was captured by the Japanese.

After his release from the Capas Concentration Camp, Gen. Capinpin joined the Japanese-sponsored government of Pres. Jose P. Laurel in the Bureau of Constabulary from 1943-1945.

When Pres. Laurel was taken out of the Philippines in August 1945, Gen. Capinpin was brought along as part of his entourage. Upon the surrender of Japan, Gen. Capinpin surrendered in Tokyo on September 5, 1945.

== Later years ==
Gen. Capinpin finally became the Adjutant General of the fledging Armed Forces of the Philippines after World War 2, and retired from military service on April 30, 1948. He became the Superintendent of the Far East Military Academy (FEMA) along Highway 54.

He died from heart attack at his residence in Biñan, Laguna, on December 28, 1958, and was buried at the Biñan Municipal Cemetery.

Camp Mateo Capinpin in Tanay, Rizal, which is currently the garrison of the 2nd Infantry Division also known as the "Jungle Fighter Division," was named in his honor.

== See also ==
- Philippine Scouts
- 1st Regular Division (Philippine Commonwealth)
- 2nd Infantry Division (Philippines)
- 21st Infantry Division (Philippines)
- Vicente Lim
- Fidel V. Segundo
- Guillermo Francisco
- Basilio Valdes
- Paulino Santos
