= Battle of Bataan =

Part of Japan's invasion of the Philippines during WWII

- Part of the Philippines campaign in World War II
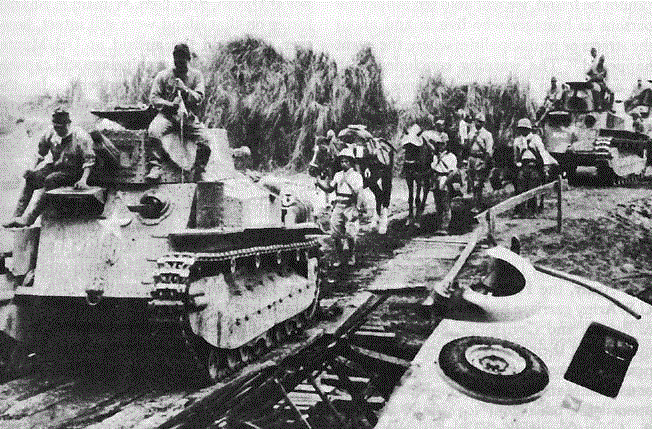
- Japanese tank column advancing in the Bataan Peninsula of Luzon
Date	7 January – 9 April 1942 (3 months and 2 days)
Location	Bataan Peninsula near Manila Bay in Luzon Island, Philippines
Result	Japanese victory: Followed by the Bataan Death March and Battle of Corregidor.

Belligerents
United States: Philippines	Japan

Commanders and leaders
(United States) Douglas MacArthur (United States) Jonathan Wainwright (United States) Edward P. King (Commonwealth of the Philippines) Vicente Lim (Commonwealth of the Philippines) Mateo Capinpin	(Empire of Japan) Masaharu Homma (Empire of Japan) Takaji Wachi (Empire of Japan) Masami Maeda

Strength
120,000 Filipino and U.S troops.	75,000 Japanese troops.

Casualties and losses
106,000; 10,000 killed, 20,000 wounded, 76,000 captured	8,406–22,250; 3,107 killed, 230 missing, 5,069 wounded

The Battle of Bataan (Filipino: Labanan sa Bataan; 7 January – 9 April 1942) was fought by the United States and the Philippine Commonwealth against the Empire of Japan during World War II. The battle represented the most intense phase of the Japanese invasion of the Philippines during World War II. In January 1942, forces of the Imperial Japanese Army and Navy invaded Luzon along with several islands in the Philippine Archipelago after the bombing of the American naval base at Pearl Harbor.

The commander in chief of the U.S. and Filipino forces in the islands, General Douglas MacArthur, consolidated all of his Luzon-based units on the Bataan Peninsula to fight against the Japanese army. By this time, the Japanese controlled nearly all of Southeast Asia. The Bataan Peninsula and the island of Corregidor were the only remaining Allied strongholds in the region.

Despite their lack of supplies, American and Filipino forces managed to fight the Japanese for three months, engaging them initially in a fighting retreat southward. As the combined American and Filipino forces made a last stand, the delay cost the Japanese valuable time and prevented immediate victory across the Pacific. The American surrender at Bataan to the Japanese, with 76,000 soldiers surrendering in the Philippines altogether, was the largest in American and Filipino military histories and was the largest United States surrender since the American Civil War's Battle of Harpers Ferry. Soon afterwards, U.S. and Filipino prisoners of war were forced into the roughly 65-mile (105 km) Bataan Death March.

== Background ==
In 1936, Douglas MacArthur was appointed Field Marshal of the Philippine army, given the task of developing an effective defensive force before independence in 1946. Chief of Staff of the U.S. Army General George C. Marshall intended to make the Philippines reasonably defensible, "...we felt that we could block the Japanese advance and block their entry into war by their fear of what would happen if they couldn't take the Philippines..." MacArthur anticipated having until April 1942 to train and equip a combat ready force.

On 26 July 1941 MacArthur was recalled to active duty within the US army and given the rank of lieutenant general. In August, MacArthur called into service one regiment for each of his ten reserve divisions, and inducted them into the US armed forces. On 27 November, he received notice, "Japanese future action unpredictable but hostile action possible at any moment. If hostilities cannot, repeat cannot, be avoided the United States desires that Japan commit the first overt act." On 18 December, ten days after the start of hostilities, MacArthur inducted the remaining reservists. The Philippine Army consisted of 120,000 men, of which 76,750 were on Luzon. On 24 December, as Masaharu Homma's Japanese Fourteenth Area Army advanced and General Jonathan Wainwright's North Luzon Force retreated, MacArthur ordered his Far East Air Force headquarters south towards Bataan. This prompted Lewis H. Brereton to abandon Clark Field, Nichols Field, Fort William McKinley, and Nielson Field for the Pilar, Bataan, Cabcaben and Mariveles gravel strips. By the end of the year, Bataan contained 15,000 Americans, 65,000 Filipinos, and 26,000 refugees. Adequate munitions had been stored or shipped in by the end of the year, but food supplies amounted to only about a two-month supply, far short of the needed six months in the prewar plans.

In one last coordinated action by the Far East Air Force, U.S. planes damaged two Japanese transports and a destroyer, and sank one minesweeper. These air attacks and naval actions, however, did not significantly delay the Japanese assault.

== War Plan Orange ==
When MacArthur returned to active duty, the latest revision plans for the defense of the Philippine Islands had been completed in April 1941 and was called WPO-3, based on the joint Army-Navy War Plan Orange of 1938, which involved hostilities between the United States and Japan. Under WPO-3, the Philippine garrison was to hold the entrance to Manila Bay and deny its use to Japanese naval forces, and ground forces were to prevent enemy landings. If the enemy prevailed, they were to withdraw to the Bataan Peninsula, which was recognized as the key to the control of Manila Bay. It was to be defended to the "last extremity". In addition to the regular U.S. Army troops, the defenders could rely on the Philippine Army, which had been organized and trained by General MacArthur.

However, in April 1941 the Navy estimated that it would require at least two years for the Pacific Fleet to fight its way across the Pacific. Army planners in early 1941 believed supplies would be exhausted within six months and the garrison would fall. MacArthur assumed command of the Allied army in July 1941 and rejected WPO-3 as defeatist, preferring a more aggressive course of action. He recommended—among other things—a coastal defense strategy that would include the entire archipelago. His recommendations were followed in the plan that was eventually approved. With approval from Washington, War Plan Rainbow 5 was implemented such that the entire archipelago would be defended, with the necessary supplies dispersed behind the beachheads for defending forces to use while defending against the landings. With the return to War Plan Orange 3, the necessary supplies to support the defenders for the anticipated six-month-long defensive position were not available in the necessary quantities for the defenders who would withdraw to Bataan.

== Battle ==
When the Japanese made their first landings on 10 and 12 December at the northern and southern extremities of Luzon, MacArthur made no disposition to contest them. He correctly surmised that these landings were designed to secure advance air bases and that the Japanese had no intention of driving on Manila from any of these beachheads. He did not regard the situation as serious enough to warrant a change in his plan to oppose the main attack, when it came, with an all-out defense at the beaches. The MacArthur Plan, then, remained in effect.

On 20 December the submarine USS Stingray spotted a large convoy of troop ships with escorts. This was General Homma's landing force which included 85 troop transports, two battleships, six cruisers, and two dozen destroyers. The convoy was engaged by three submarines: USS Stingray, USS Saury, and USS Salmon, who fired multiple torpedoes into the convoy, most of which failed to explode because of the Mark XIV torpedo's defective detonators. In all, just two troop ships were sunk before Japanese destroyers chased the submarines away.

=== Fighting retreat ===
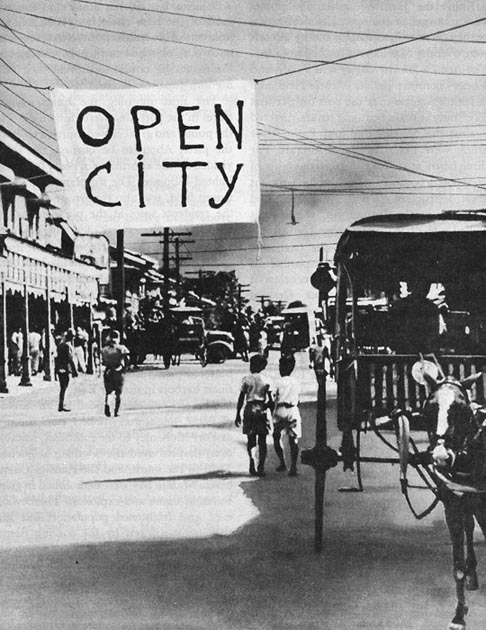
Japanese troops occupy Manila, as it is declared an open city to avoid its destruction, 2 January 1942

MacArthur intended to move his men with their equipment and supplies in good order to their defensive positions. He charged the North Luzon Force, under Wainwright, with holding back the main Japanese assault and keeping the road to Bataan open for use by the South Luzon Force of Major General George Parker, which proceeded quickly and in remarkably good order, given the chaotic situation. To achieve this, Wainwright deployed his forces in a series of five defensive lines outlined in WPO-3:

- D1: Aguilar to San Carlos to Urdaneta City
- D2: Agno River
- D3: Santa Ignacia to Gerona to Guimba to San Jose
- D4: Tarlac to Cabanatuan
- D5: Bamban to Sibul Springs

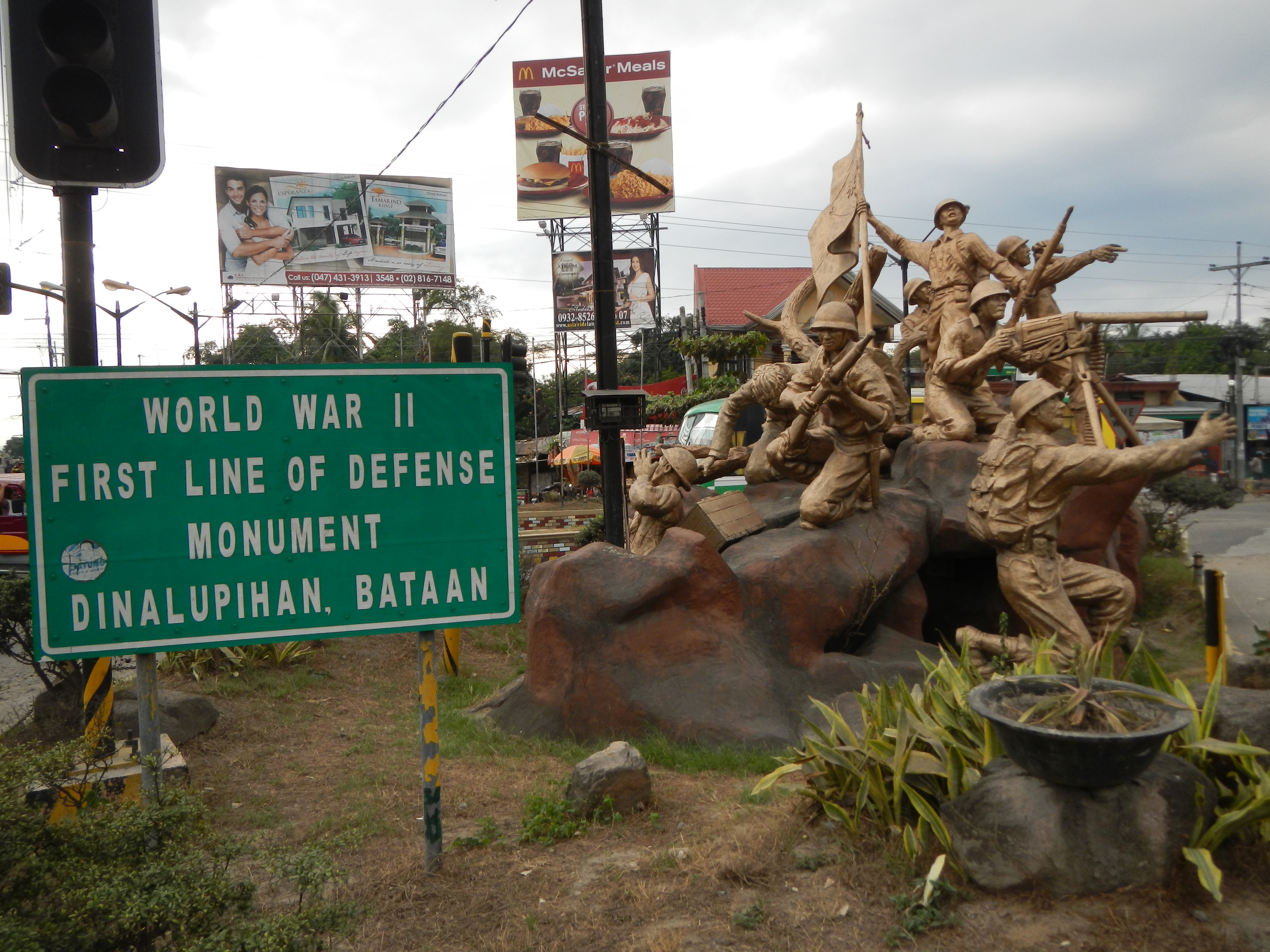
WWII First Line of Defense Memorial (Dinalupihan, Bataan, Philippines)

The main force of Homma's 14th Area Army came ashore at Lingayen Gulf on the morning of 22 December. The defenders failed to hold the beaches. By the end of the day, the Japanese had secured most of their objectives and were in position to emerge onto the central plain. Facing Homma's troops were four Filipino divisions: the 21st, the 71st, the 11th, and the 91st, as well as a battalion of Philippine Scouts backed by a few tanks. Along Route 3—a cobblestone road that led directly to Manila—the Japanese soon made contact with the Filipino 71st Division. At this point the action of the American artillery stalled the Japanese attack. However, Japanese planes and tanks entering the action routed the Filipino infantry, leaving the artillery uncovered. A second Japanese division landed at Lamon Bay, south of Manila, on 23 December and advanced north.

It became evident to Wainwright that he could no longer hold back the Japanese advance. Late on the afternoon of 23 December Wainwright telephoned MacArthur's headquarters in Manila and informed him that any further defense of the Lingayen beaches was "impracticable". He requested and was given permission to withdraw behind the Agno River. MacArthur weighed two choices: either make a firm stand on the line of the Agno and give Wainwright his best unit, the Philippine Division, for a counterattack; or withdraw all the way to Bataan in planned stages. He decided on the latter, thus abandoning his own plan for defense and reverting to the old Orange plan. Having made his decision to withdraw to Bataan, MacArthur notified all force commanders on the night of 23 December that "WPO-3 is in effect."

Meanwhile, Manuel L. Quezon, the President of the Philippine Commonwealth, together with his family and government staff were evacuated to Corregidor, along with MacArthur's United States Army Forces in the Far East (USAFFE) headquarters, on the night of 24 December, while all USAFFE military personnel were removed from the major urban areas. On 26 December Manila was officially declared an open city, and MacArthur's proclamation was published in the newspapers and broadcast over the radio. The Japanese were not notified officially of the proclamation but learned of it through radio broadcasts. The next day and thereafter they bombed the port area, from which supplies were being shipped to Bataan and Corregidor.

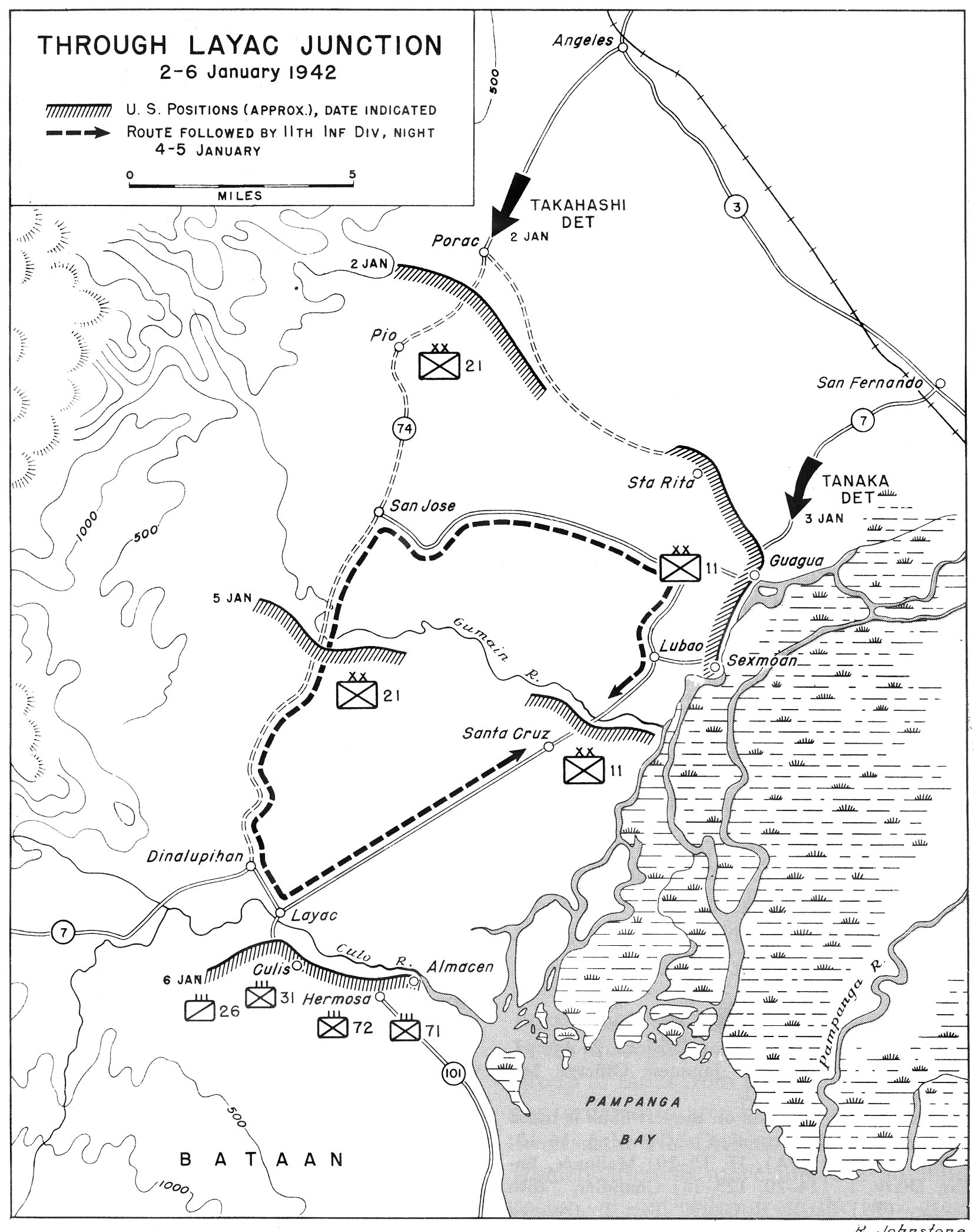
Defense of the Layac Junction approach to Bataan 2–6 January, 1942

As MacArthur concentrated the South Luzon Force on the Bataan Peninsula and prepared defensive positions, the North Luzon Force delayed the Japanese advance from the north. However, the main force of the Japanese 14th Army's 60,000 men was concentrating on capturing Manila. Only two reinforced Japanese regiments, the 9th Infantry and the 2nd Formosa Infantry, were advancing on Bataan.

==== Porac–Guagua Line ====
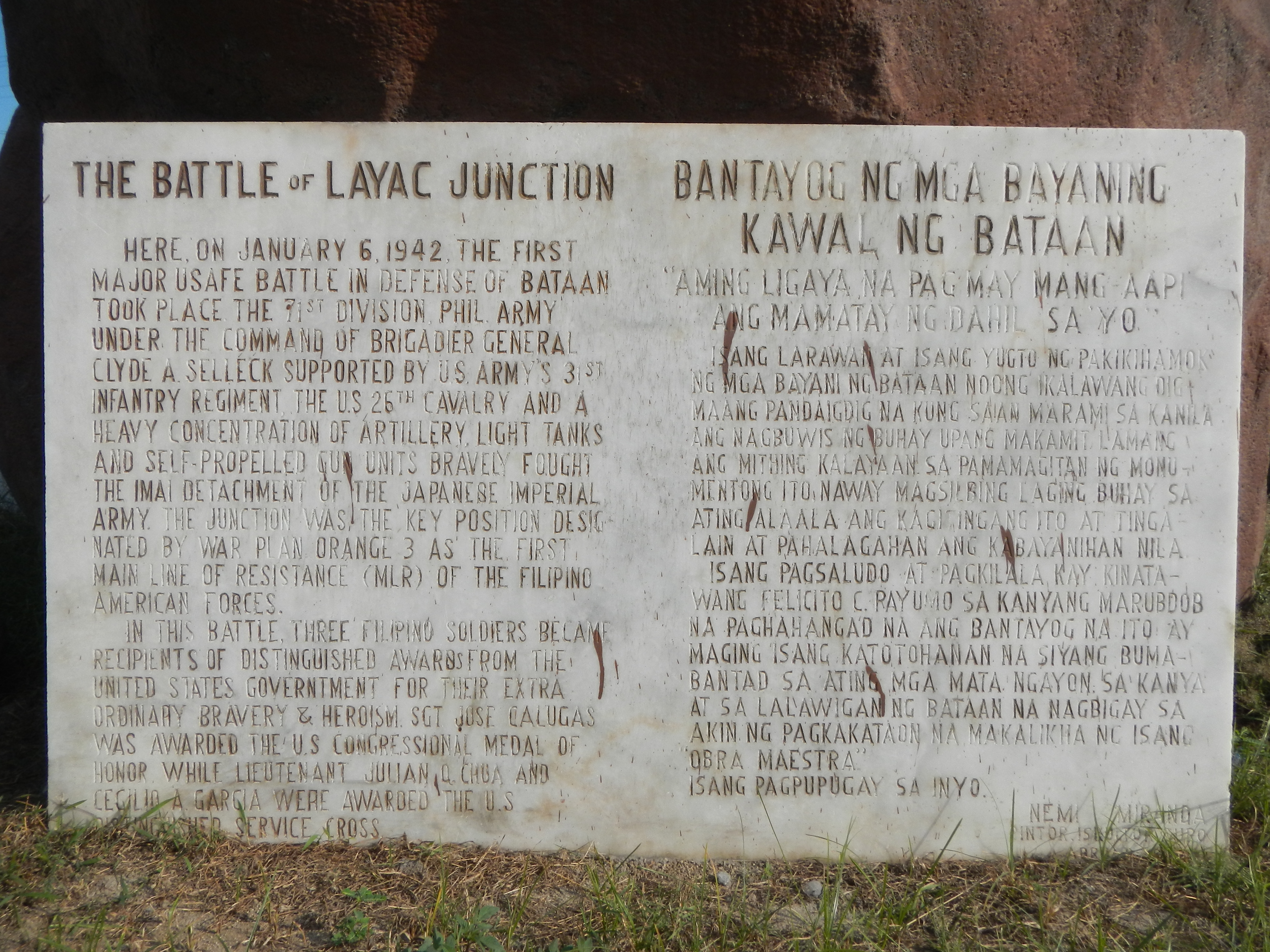
Historical Marker (6 January 1942)

During the first few days in January 1942, Brigadier General William E. Brougher's 11th Division, and Brigadier General Mateo Capinpin's 21st Division, supported by the 26th Cavalry Regiment, fought a delaying action along the Guagua-Porac Line. Starting on the afternoon of 2 January, the Japanese 9th Infantry forced the 21st Division south from Porac to new defensive lines south of the Gumain River by 4 January. Starting on 3 January, the Japanese 2nd Formosa Infantry pushed the 11th Infantry south from Guagua, then on to Lubao, and then to the Gumain River by 5 January. On 5 and 6 January 21 and 11 Division crossed the Culo River into Bataan.

==== Layac Line ====
Brigadier General Clyde A. Selleck was assigned responsibility for establishing and holding a defensive position at Layac. He was supposed to hold that position for several days, enabling preparation of the Abucay Line. Selleck was assigned four regiments for the task, the American 31st Infantry and Scout 26th Cavalry, and the Philippine 71st and 72nd infantry regiments from the 71st Division. These units occupied the position on 3 January, and on 6 January were attacked by units from the Imai Detachment, commanded by Hifumi Imai. As more Japanese arrived during the day, Selleck was given permission by Parker to withdraw during the night.

==== Abucay–Mauban Line ====
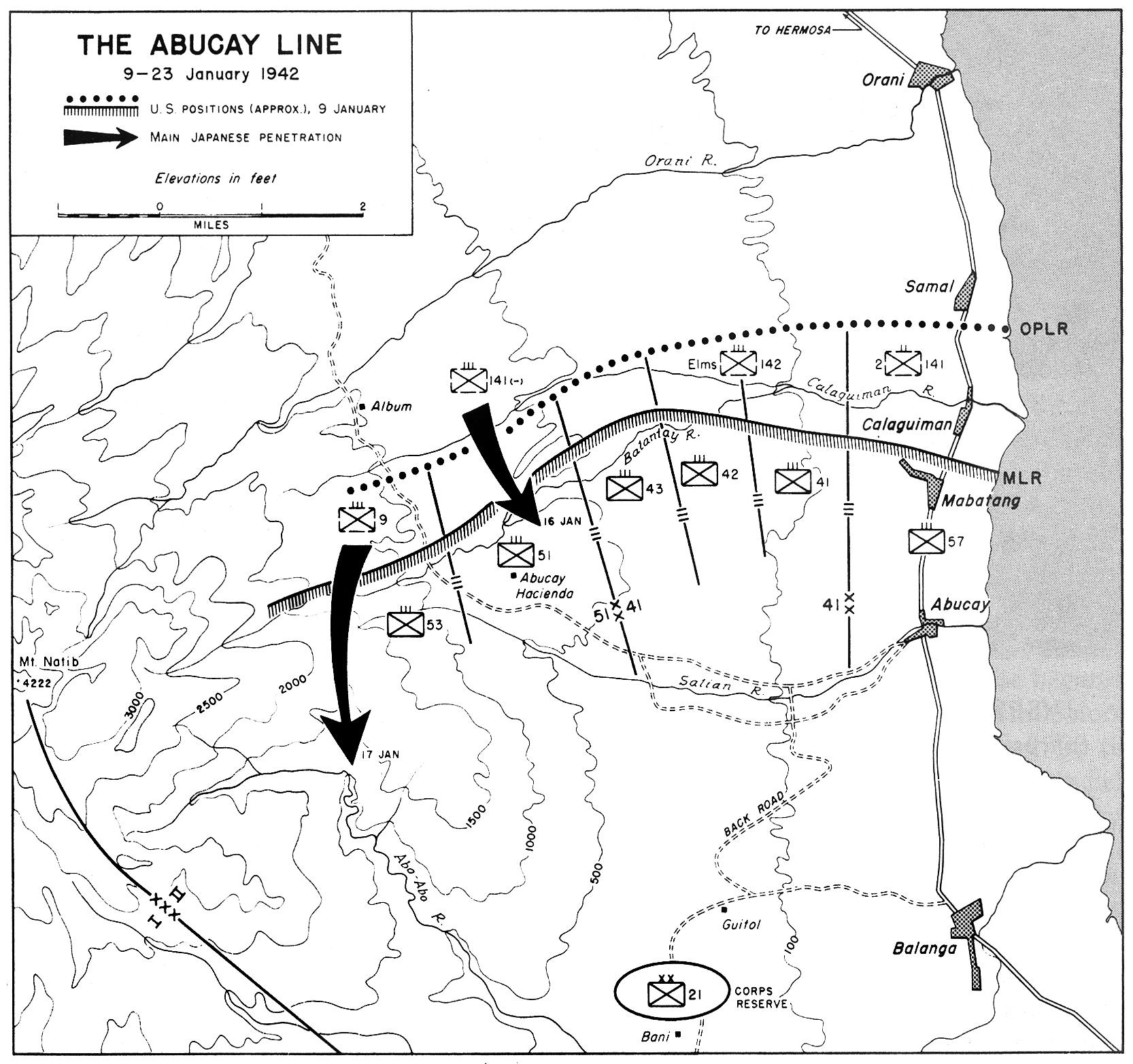
The Abucay Line 9–23 January 1942

Two separate defensive lines crossed the Bataan peninsula. They were the 8,000 yards (7,300 m) Mauban line held by I Philippine Corps on the west, and the 15,000 yards (14,000 m) Abucay line held by the II Philippine Corps on the east. Wainwright commanded the I Philippine Corps of 22,500 troops. I Corps included General Fidel Segundo's 1st Regular Division, Brigadier General Clifford Bluemel's 31st Division, Brigadier General Luther R. Stevens' 91st Divisions, and the 26th Cavalry. Parker commanded the II Philippine Corps of 25,000 troops. II Corps included the 11th and 21st Divisions, Brigadier General Vicente Lim's 41st Division, Brigadier General Albert M. Jones' 51st Division, and the 57th Infantry commanded by Colonel George S. Clarke. Antiaircraft protection was provided by the 515th Coast Artillery and the 200th Infantry Regiment, while tank support was provided by the 192nd Tank Battalion and the 194th Tank Battalion. Mount Natib [4,222 feet (1,287 m)] and Mount Silanganan [3,620 feet (1,100 m)] separated the two corps along the center of the peninsula. The commanders considered the rugged mountainous terrain impassable, so the two corps were not in direct contact with each other, which left a serious weakness.

The Allies faced Akira Nara's 65th Brigade, originally expected to only have garrison duty, since the 48th Division had been dispatched to Java. Thus, the Japanese had 23,222 soldiers on Bataan, against 15,000 Americans and 65,000 Filipinos. On 10 January, MacArthur visited his Bataan troops from Limay to Abucay on the East Road, attempting to boost morale. Along the way, he stated, "Does anybody here want to bet me fifty dollars we'll be back in Manila by Easter?" Nara's planned attack on II Corps consisted of using the 141st Infantry on his eastern wing, against the 57th Infantry, and then using his 9th Infantry on his western flank, in an attempt to overwhelm the II Corps left flank. In reserve, Nara held the 142nd Infantry.

=== Abucay ===
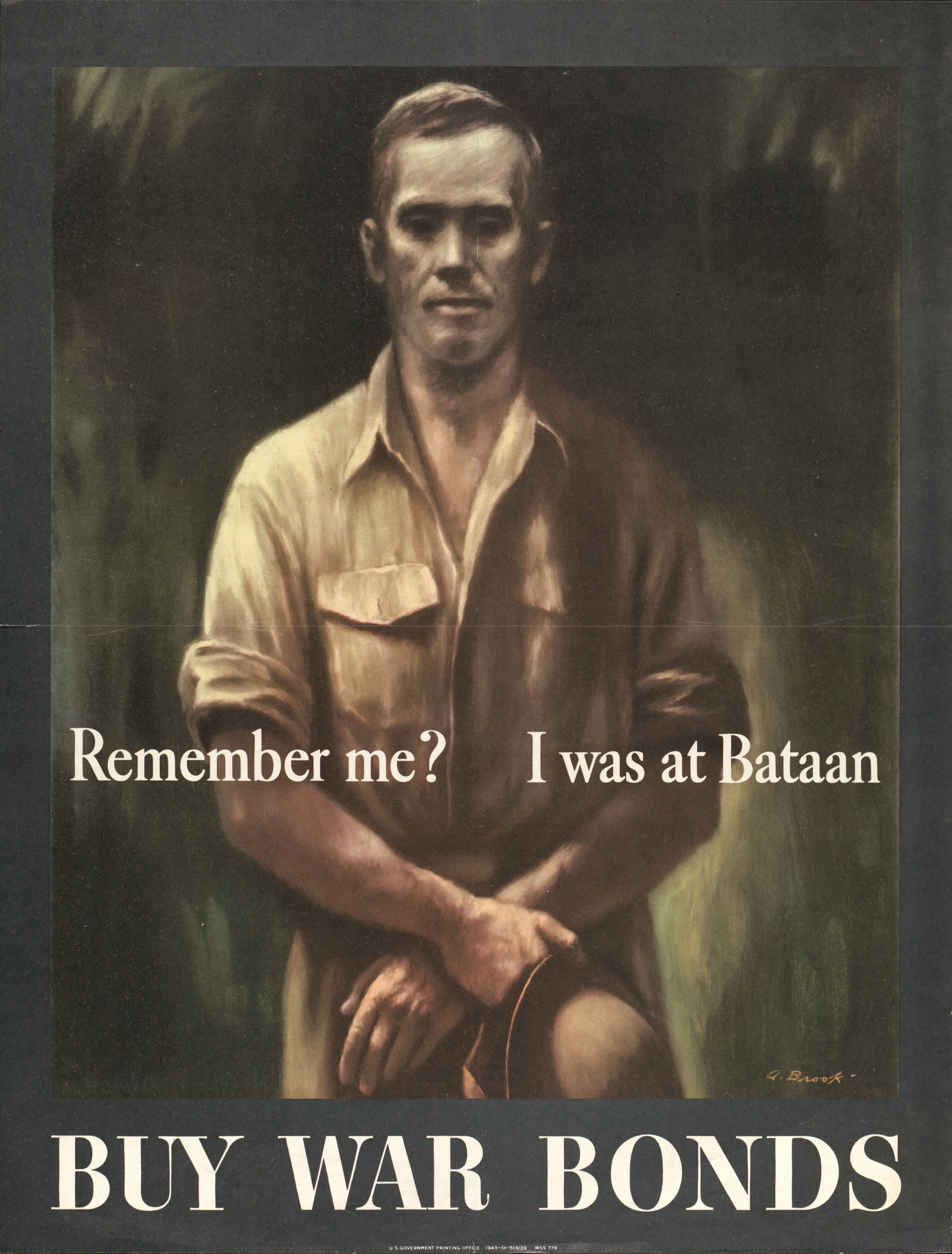
A 1943 war bonds poster by Alexander Brook evoked the sacrifice of Alexander R. Nininger in the Battle of Bataan.

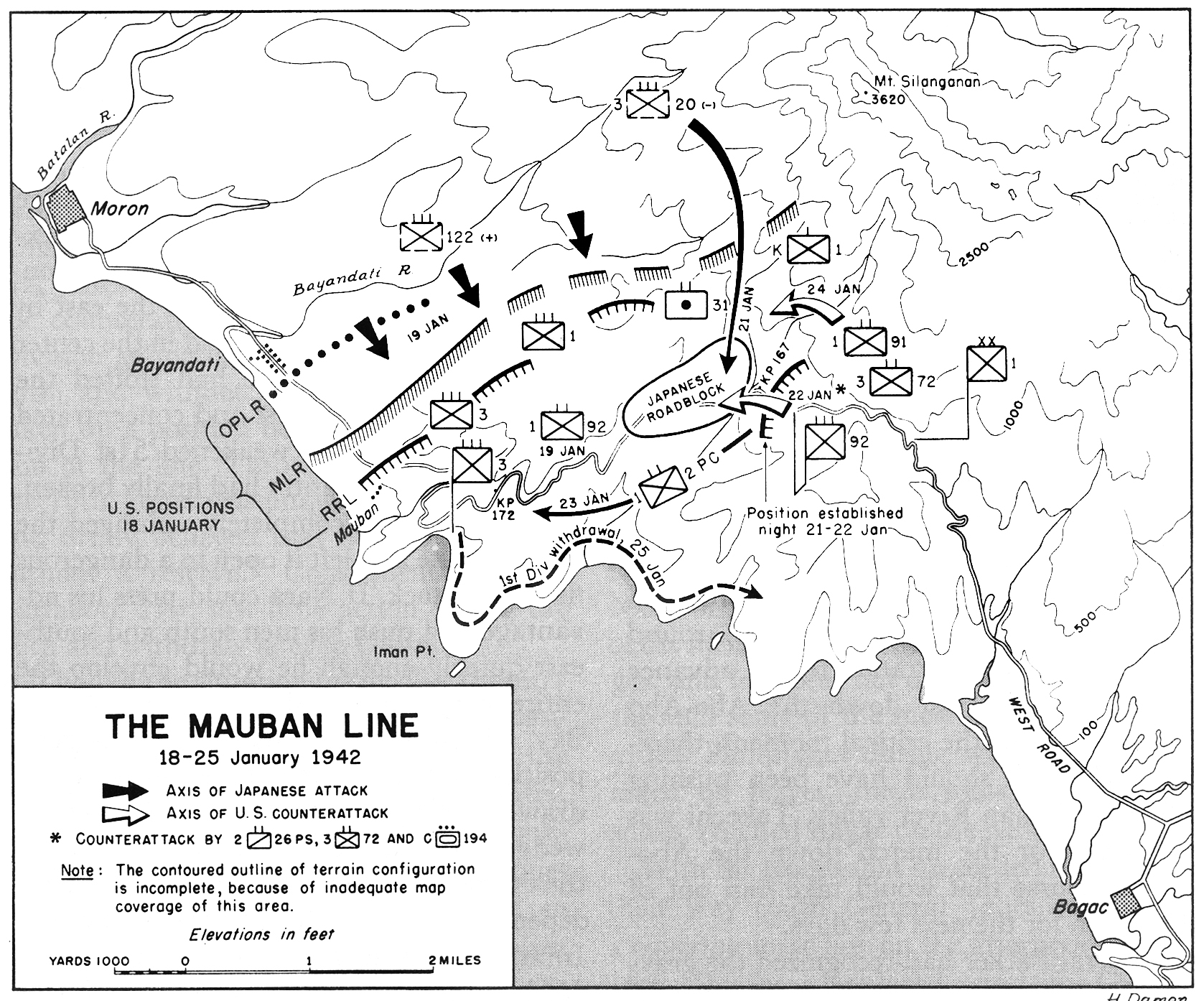
The Mauban Line positions 18–25 January 1942

On 9 January, Nara commenced his attack, concentrating on the 57th Infantry, reaching the main line of resistance on 11 January. By 12 January, Parker was forced to commit his reserve 21st Infantry in support of the 57th. Also on 12 January, Brigadier General Virgilio N. Cordero Jr.'s 52nd Infantry, "Bicol's Own", was moved forward to plug a gap that had developed in the 51st Division's right flank. By 14 January, Bluemel's 31st Division was moved from Wainwright's I Corps to Parker's II Corps, in an attempt to bolster the 41st Division. Richard J. Marshall, MacArthur's Deputy Chief of Staff based on Mt. Mariveles' Signal Hill, concerned by the gap between I and II Corps, ordered Brigadier General Maxon S. Lough's Philippine Division, consisting of the Scout 45th Infantry and the American 31st Infantry, to the front lines.

On 12 January amid fierce fighting, 2nd Lieutenant Alexander R. Nininger, a platoon leader in the 57th Infantry, sacrificed his life when, armed with only a rifle and hand grenades, he forced his way into enemy foxholes during hand-to-hand combat, permitting his unit to retake Abucay Hacienda; for his actions, he was posthumously awarded the Medal of Honor. Another extreme act of bravery was put forth by Filipino soldier Narciso Ortilano. He was on a water-cooled heavy machine gun when the Japanese burst out of a canebrake in a banzai charge. He shot dozens of the Japanese with his machine gun, then pulled out his Colt .45 and shot five more when the machine gun jammed. Then, when one Japanese soldier stabbed at him with a bayonet, he tried to grab the gun, got his thumb cut off but still held on, and turned the gun on the enemy soldier and stabbed him in the chest. When another Japanese soldier swung a bayonet at him, he turned his rifle on the soldier and shot him dead. Narcisco received the Distinguished Service Cross.

On 15 January, MacArthur issued the following statement to his troops, "Help is on the way from the United States, thousands of troops and hundreds of planes are being dispatched. It is imperative that our troops hold until these reinforcements arrive. No further retreat is possible."

On 16 January, Jones' 51st Division was ordered by Parker to counterattack. However, that attack was met head on by the Japanese 141st Infantry, and in the left flank by the Japanese 9th Infantry. A hole developed in the Abucay Line, which the Japanese failed to take advantage of. Instead, the 141st turned and attacked the 41st Division, while the 9th turned back up Mount Natib. John R. Boatwright's 53rd Infantry, on the 51st Division's left flank, was ordered to retreat south and establish contact with I Corps. By the end of the day, the 51st Division was out of action. However, Lim's 41st Division held firm. By 18 January, the Japanese had suspended their attack, and Nara's 7th Tank Regiment, plus four battalions of artillery, were removed from his control.

On 17 January, MacArthur radioed Washington, "The food situation here is becoming serious." On 17 January, the 31st Infantry was ordered to restore the main line, and then be relieved by the 11th Division. The 45th Infantry joined in the attack the next day, but both infantries made little progress, while the Japanese stepped up their attacks. Losses mounted on both sides, and by 22 January, the Philippine Division was back in its 19 January positions. More disconcerting, the Japanese 9th Infantry made advances along the side of Mount Natib and descended into Guitol, behind II Corps lines.

=== Mauban ===
On 10 January the Japanese occupied Olongapo and Grande Island. On 15 January Homma gave responsibility for western Bataan to Naoki Kimura's Detachment, consisting of the 122nd Infantry based on the West Road, and the 20th Infantry on the inland flank along Mout Silanganan. Wainwright commanded the 1st Division and 91st Division, after the departure of the 31st Division to II Corps, and the 26th Cavalrymen. On 16 January the Japanese attacked Moron, forcing Wainwright to place his 72nd Infantry astride the Pilar-Bagac Road behind his main defensive line. On 20 January, while the Japanese 122nd Infantry attacked the 1st Division, the 20th Infantry penetrated Wainwright's eastern flank, and placed a roadblock on the West Road by 21 January. Troops north of the roadblock no longer received food and ammunition resupply.

On 22 January, MacArthur ordered a withdrawal to the Pilar-Bagac Road, citing "Hostile penetration through the center of the Main Battle Position..." On 25 January I Corps began its retreat. The men north of the roadblock, led by Kearie Berry, followed the coastline to Bagac, but were forced to abandon their trucks and artillery.

=== Battle of the Points ===
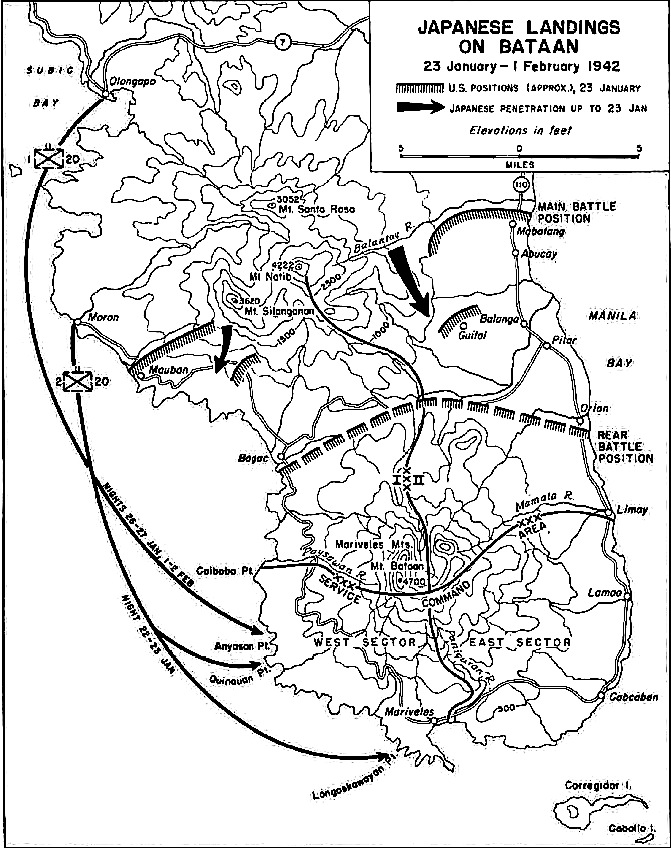
Battle of the Points Japanese landings on Bataan 22 January – 1 February 1942

Battles were fought at Longoskawayan Point from 22 January to 1 February, at Quinauan Point from 22 January to 8 February, and at the Silalim-Anyasan from 27 January to 13 February, which were collectively termed the "Battle of the Points". The final result was the complete destruction of the Japanese 1st and 2nd Battalions, 20th Infantry.

In an attempt to outflank I Corps and isolate the service command area commanded by USAFFE deputy commander Brigadier General Allan C. McBride, 900 Japanese troops of the 2nd Battalion, 20th Infantry, 16th Division, led by Nariyoshi Tsunehiro, were landed on the west coast of southern Bataan on the night of 22 January. Intercepted by PT-34, two barges were sunk and the rest scattered in two groups, neither of which landed on the objective of Caibobo Point, but instead 300 landed on Longoskawayan Point and the other 600 on Quinauan Point. The Japanese forces were contained by members of Philippine Constabulary regiments, Francis J. Bridget's Naval Battalion, gunfire from Battery Geary, support from USS Quail, tanks from the 192nd Tank Battalion, and by personnel of the 34th Pursuit Squadron and 21st Pursuit Squadron. Noted participants included Clinton A. Pierce, Mariano Castañeda, Pelagio Cruz, Ed Dyess and Ray C. Hunt. The Japanese landings were finally reversed with the aid of units from the 57th and 45th Infantry.

The naval infantry consisted of 150 ground crewmen from Patrol Wing Ten, 80 sailors from the Cavite Naval Ammunition Depot, and 130 sailors from USS Canopus (AS-9), with 120 sailors from the base facilities at Cavite, Olongapo, and Mariveles, and 120 Marines from an antiaircraft battery. Sailors used the Canopus machine shop to fabricate makeshift mountings for machine guns salvaged from Patrol Wing Ten's damaged aircraft. The Marines were distributed through the ranks, and the sailors were told to "watch them and do as they do." The sailors attempted to make their white uniforms more suitable for jungle combat by dying them with coffee grounds. The result was closer to yellow than khaki, and the diary of a dead Japanese officer described them as a suicide squad dressed in brightly colored uniforms and talking loudly in an attempt to draw fire and reveal the enemy positions.

On 25 January, Homma ordered the 16th Division commander Susumu Morioka to send 200 men in support of the Quinauan Point beachhead. On 27 January, once again, the landing went off course and the men landed between the Anyasan and Silaiim rivers. They were contained by the 17th Pursuit Squadron and 2nd Constabulary. On 29 January, units of the 45th Infantry arrived in support. On 1 February, Mitsuo Kimura's 1st Battalion, 20th Infantry, was ordered to Quinauan Point and seize Mount Mariveles. On 2 February, his 500 men on barges, supported by the Yaeyama, were attacked from the air by P-40's, PT 32, and land-based artillery. The survivors retreated to a landing on Silaiim Point. Edmund J. Lilly, and Harold Keith Johnson assumed command of the blocking forces, that included elements of the 12th and 57th Infantry, plus tanks from the 192 Tank Battalion. Several Japanese attempts to escape by sea from 7 February onwards failed. Finally, a desperation drive by 200 Japanese out of the point northwards also failed.

=== Battle of Trail Two ===
On 26 January, Nara's 65th Brigade was ordered to pursue the retreating Filipino and American forces. Nara assumed the next defensive line would extend from Limay to Mount Mariveles. Thus Nara proceeded to advance against the Orion-Bagac line, assuming it consisted of outer defensives. Nara's objective was to advance south along Trail 2, and then along the eastern base of Mount Samat. Opposing Nara were troops commanded by Bluemel. On 27 January, Nara commenced his attack with the 9th and 141st infantry against the 51st Infantry south of the Pilar River. On 28 January, the 41st Infantry arrived in support of the 51st. Fighting continued for the next few days, until on 29 January, Nara was ordered to return the 9th Infantry to the 16th Division. Bluemel decided to counterattack on 2 February with the 41st Infantry, 51st Combat Team, and the 31st Engineer Battalion, supported on the left by the 21st Division, and on the right by the 32nd Infantry. By 8 February, recognizing the attacks by the 65th Brigade were failures resulting in crippling losses, Nara was ordered to withdraw north to the Pilar-Bagac Road.

=== Battle of the Pockets ===
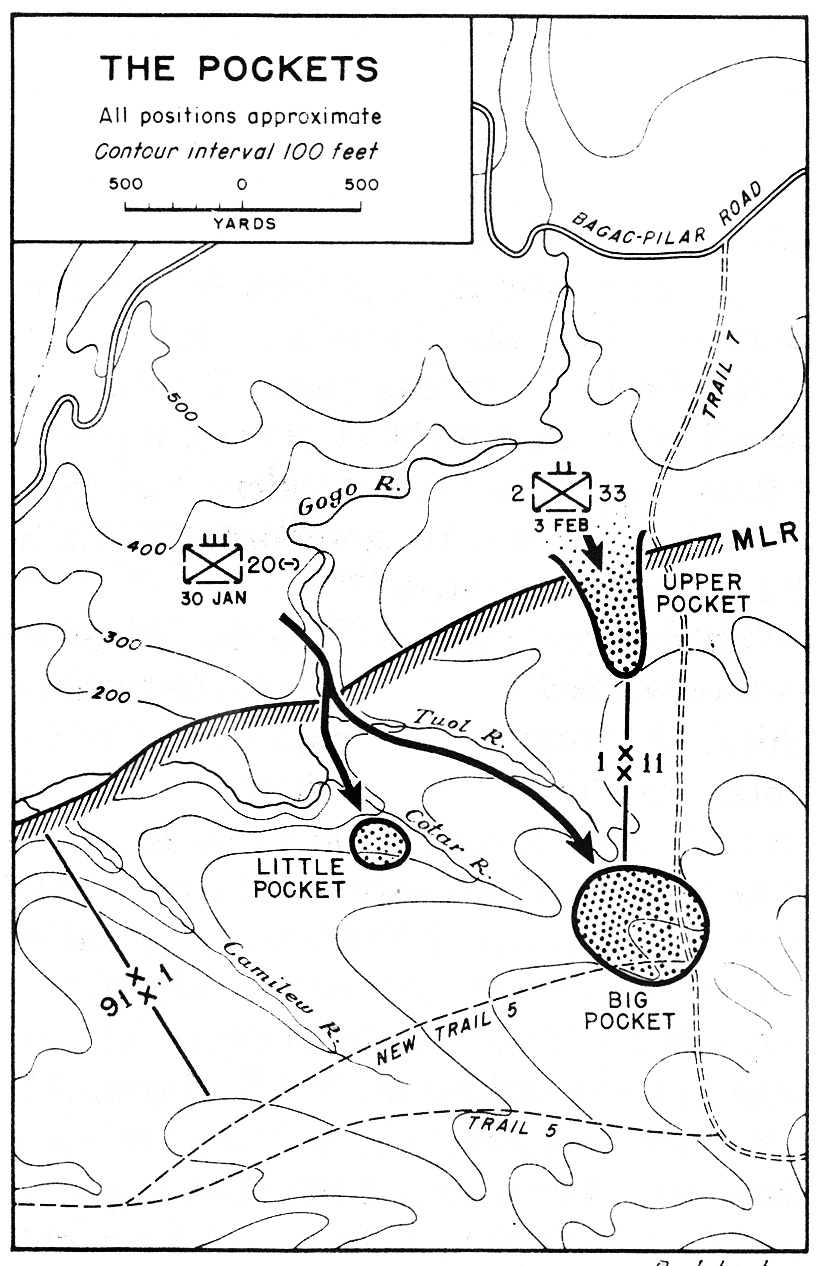
Battle of the Pockets on the Orion-Bagac Line

On 28 January, Hiroshi Nakanishi's 3rd Battalion, and Yorimasa Yoshioka's 20th Infantry staff, attacked I Corps' Orion-Bagac line and was able to break through into the 1st Division's rear along the Tuol River. The Japanese were separated into two pockets, a Little Pocket consisting of about one company, and a Big Pocket with 1000 men. By 5 February, Wainwright had committed five 1st Division companies, two 92nd Infantry battalions, one Scout battalion, one Constabulary battalion, plus tanks from the 192nd Tank Battalion, and artillery from the 24th Field Artillery, in an attempt to eliminate the Little and Big Pockets. On 6 February a Japanese salient formed, the Upper Pocket, when the 122nd Infantry and the 2nd Battalion, 33rd Infantry, penetrated within 800 yards of the Big Pocket. On 7 February, the 1st Division surrounded the Little Pocket, which was eliminated by 9 February. Concentrating on attacking the Big Pocket next, Trail 7 was secured by 10 February. On 11 February, Yoshioka attempted to breakout to the north, in conjunction with a general 14th Army withdrawal across Bataan. On 15 February 377 Japanese reached their own lines, and the Upper Pocket was abandoned. With the elimination of the Japanese 20th Infantry, I Corps' line was restored on 26 February.

On 3 February 1 Lieutenant Willibald C. Bianchi of the 45th Infantry, Philippine Scouts, led a reinforced platoon forward against two enemy machine-gun nests, silenced them with grenades, and despite two gunshot wounds to the chest, then manned an antiaircraft machine gun until being knocked off the tank by a third severe wound.

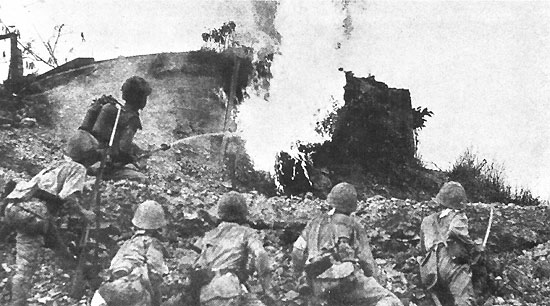
Japanese flamethrower in action against a bunker on the Orion-Bagac Line

=== Orion-Bagac Line ===
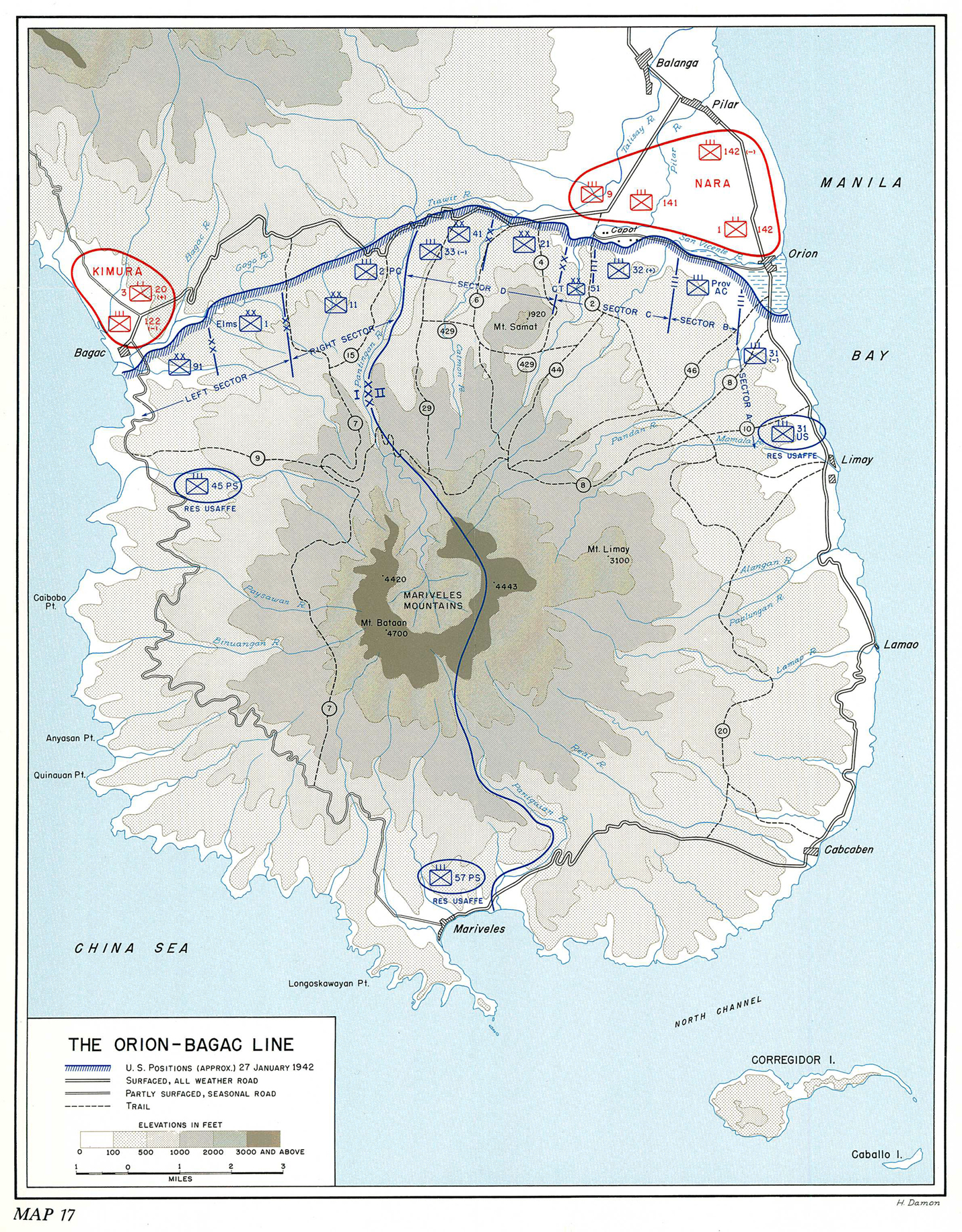
The Orion–Bagac line showing the U.S. positions around 27 January 1942

By 8 February, Homma recognized he only had three effective infantry battalions on Bataan, and ordered the halt of further attacks. His army retreated to better positions up to ten kilometers from the front, and awaited reinforcements. His staff believed, "there was an influence, a spiritual influence, exerted by the American resistance on Bataan. Not only did the Japanese at home worry about the length of the period of American resistance on Bataan, but it served as a symbol to the Filipinos that the Americans had not deserted them and would continue to assist them." Yet, MacArthur's army on Bataan was a besieged garrison on a starvation diet.

On 20 February, the President of the Philippines Manuel L. Quezon, his family, Vice President of the Philippines Sergio Osmeña, Chief Justice of the Philippines José Abad Santos, and three Philippine Army officers, were evacuated on board the Swordfish. On 22 February, MacArthur was ordered to leave. Wainwright was given command of the Luzon Force, and then all United Forces in the Philippines (USFIP) on 21 March, reporting to MacArthur. Edward P. King assumed command of the Luzon Force. Jones took over I Corps, Parker remained in charge of II Corps, while Lewis C. Beebe was made MacArthur's deputy chief of staff.

On the night of 12 March MacArthur, his family, and several USAFFE staff officers left Corregidor for Mindanao aboard four PT boats commanded by Naval Lieutenant John D. Bulkeley. For this, and a number of other feats over the course of four months and eight days, Bulkeley was awarded the Medal of Honor, the Navy Cross, the Distinguished Service Cross and other citations. MacArthur was eventually flown to Australia where he broadcast to the Filipino people his famous "I Shall Return" promise.

On 17 March, Washington notified Wainwright of MacArthur's safe arrival in Australia. Additionally, the message stated, "I assume that you are fully acquainted with the various measures that have been instituted for running the blockade and keeping our forces partially supplied with critical items. In an effort to provide you with some air assistance we are placing one or two crated P-40s on each blockade runner, including six converted destroyers of which the leading vessels are now enroute via Hawaii." Of these six blockade runners, the Masaya, Matagalpa, Teapa, Margaret Schafer, Mount Baker, and Texada, only the first two made it past Hawaii, and they were diverted instead to Australia. Other blockade runners included the Don Isidro, Coast Farmer, Dona Nati, and the Anhui, but only the last three were partially successful. Resupply by submarine, including the Seawolf, Trout, Seadragon, Permit, and the Sargo were also only partially successful. By the end of February, the rice and flour had run out.

On 23 February, Homma's chief of staff Masami Maeda, was replaced by Takaji Wachi, and plans were made for an April offensive. Reinforcements included additional men for the 16th Division and 65th Brigade, plus Kenzo Kitano's 4th Infantry Division, and Kameichiro Nagano's 21st Division. Wachi observed that, "The Japanese Army was severely beaten by the Philippine Army. [Enemy] artillery was so accurate and powerful that the Japanese Army feared this most." So additional artillery was added to Kishio Kitajima's Artillery Group, including 300 mm mortars, Type 45 240 mm howitzers, 150 mm mortars and howitzers, and 75 mm mountain guns. Kizo Mikami's 22nd Air Brigade was also augmented with the 60th and 62nd Heavy Bombardment Regiments. The 1st Balloon Company provided additional aerial observation. On 22 March, King ignored a Japanese offer of honorable surrender that cited the defeat of Britain and Netherland East Indies.

By 3 April, King's Luzon Force consisted of 79,000 soldiers, with 32,600 in I Corps, and 28,000 in II Corps. Yet malnutrition, disease and fatigue limited their strength. King was also down to two P40s and two P-35s. The Left Sector of I Corps was held by Luther Stevens' 91st and 1st Divisions, while the Right Sector was held by Brougher's 11th Division and 2nd Constabulary. Sector A of II Corps was held by John Irwin's Philippine Army's 31st Infantry, Sector B by Irvin Doane's Provisional Air Corps Regiment, Sector C by Clifford Bluemel's 32nd Infantry and 51st Combat Team, Sector D by Maxon Lough's 21st and 41st Divisions, while Sector E was held by Guillermo B. Francisco's American 31st and 57th Infantry.

=== Fall of Bataan ===
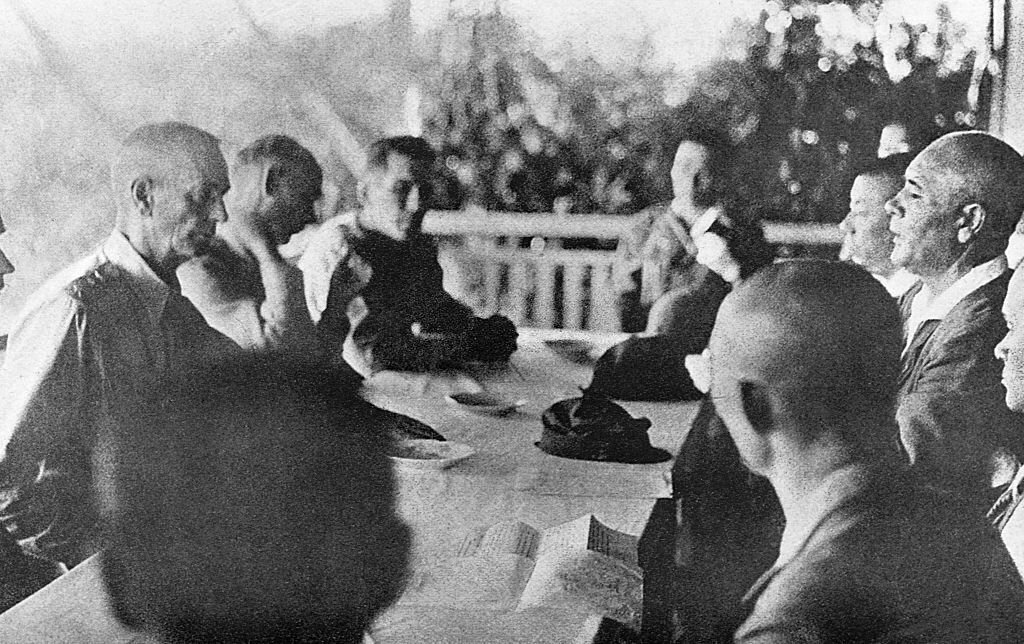
General Wainwright and his staff negotiate the surrender of Bataan with General Homma, Cabcaben, Bataan, 6 May 1942

On 3 April, at 15:00, Homma planned to attack the Orion Bagac Line, using Kitano's 4th Division to breach the II Corps left flank along Mount Samat, and then proceed southeast to Manila Bay. Nara's 65th Brigade would be on Kitano's right, while the 21st Division would be a diversionary force on II Corps' right flank, and the 16th Division diverted I Corps. Homma expected Bataan to fall within a month. On 23 March, Japanese aerial bombardment commenced.

On 3 April at 09:00, Kishio Kitajima's 196 gun bombardment commenced, accompanied by 150 sorties of Kizo Mikamai's 22nd Air Brigade. By 1500 hours, Nara's 65th Brigade advanced south along Trail 29 between the Catamon and Pantingan Rivers, while Kureo Taniguchi led the Right Wing of Kenzo Kitano's 4th Division south along Trail 6. By the end of the day the 42nd Infantry and 43rd Infantry, Lim's 41st Division, were in retreat.

On 4 April the Japanese artillery bombardment and aerial barrage continued. The 65th Brigade continued its advance south down Trail 29, as the 41st Division continued its retreat. Now the Japanese 4th Division's Left and Right Wings forced the 21st, 22nd and 23rd Infantry, 21st Division, to retreat. King then committed his Luzon Force reserves in an attempt to prevent the total collapse of Sector D.

On 5 April, the Japanese Right Wing captured Mt. Samat, with the 41st Artillery batteries, and proceeded down the southern slopes. The 51st Combat Team in Sector C now came under attack. Wainwright, visiting the II Corps front from Corregidor, ordered a counterattack by Jasper Brady's American 31st Infantry, the 45th Infantry, and the 57th Infantry for the next day. However, Wainwright told MacArthur, "The troops have been on half rations for three months and are now on less than that amount which results in much loss of physical vigor and sickness." The attempted counterattack proved futile, and the defenders were forced to fall back onto the east bank of the San Vicente River. By the end of 6 April, according to Whitman, "General Homma's army had destroyed two divisions, the 21st and the 41st, and one regiment, the 51st. Homma had also cut off two regiments from the main area of interest, the 41st and 45th infantry, and isolated Sector D headquarters from its troops. The left flank of II Corps was smashed, the two corps split apart, Mount Samat lost, defending artillery all but neutralized, and the rear of Parker's II Corps invitingly open to Japanese exploitation."

On 7 April, the Japanese offensive struck Bluemel's Sector C, and soon the San Vicente line collapsed. First retreating to the Mamala River, eventually what was left of Bluemel's 31st and 57th infantry were joined by the 26th Cavalry on the Alangan River. To their right were the remnants of Irwin's Sectors A and B. Similarly, I Corps retreated to the Binuangan River. Homma's offensive had accomplished in 5 days what was expected to take a month, with minimal loss.

On 8 April, Bluemel was forced to retreat further along Trail 20 to the Lamao River. He was told he need hold that line only until the next day when, "A car carrying a white flag will go through the lines on the east road at daylight." King stated, "I feel that further resistance would only uselessly waste life." Wainwright messaged MacArthur, "The troops are so weak from malnutrition that they have no power of resistance." The nurses from Hospitals 1 and 2 were evacuated to Corregidor, leaving 24,000 sick and wounded. Depots and warehouses were destroyed that night, as the last two P-40s, two P-35s, and a Grumman J2F Duck carrying Carlos P. Romulo, fled south from Bataan and Cabcaben airfields. The Dewey, Bittern, and Canopus were scuttled.

All along the battle front, units of I Corps, together with the devastated remnants of II Corps, crumbled and straggled to the rear. The commanders on Bataan lost all contact with their units, except by runner in a few instances. In the last two days of the defense roads south were clogged with refugees and fleeing troops, with some evacuated by YAG-4 from the Mariveles Naval Base.

On 9 April, King first met with Nagano at the Lamao River bridge, who then led King's party to an experimental farm station house, awaiting the arrival of Colonel Motoo Nakayama, 14th Army senior operations officer. However, Nakayama could only accept the surrender of all forces in the Philippines, not in a limited area. King was then driven to the Balanga Elementary School for questioning and photographs. According to John Whitman, "No surrender document was prepared or signed, nor was an effort made to formulate the surrender."

Radio broadcast – Voice of Freedom – Malinta Tunnel – Corregidor – 9 April 1942:

Bataan has fallen. The Philippine-American troops on this war-ravaged and bloodstained peninsula have laid down their arms. With heads bloody but unbowed, they have yielded to the superior force and numbers of the enemy.

The world will long remember the epic struggle that Filipino and American soldiers put up in the jungle fastnesses and along the rugged coast of Bataan. They have stood up uncomplaining under the constant and grueling fire of the enemy for more than three months. Besieged on land and blockaded by sea, cut off from all sources of help in the Philippines and in America, the intrepid fighters have done all that human endurance could bear.

For what sustained them through all these months of incessant battle was a force that was more than merely physical. It was the force of an unconquerable faith—something in the heart and soul that physical hardship and adversity could not destroy. It was the thought of native land and all that it holds most dear, the thought of freedom and dignity and pride in these most priceless of all our human prerogatives.

The adversary, in the pride of his power and triumph, will credit our troops with nothing less than the courage and fortitude that his own troops have shown in battle. Our men have fought a brave and bitterly contested struggle. All the world will testify to the most superhuman endurance with which they stood up until the last in the face of overwhelming odds.

But the decision had to come. Men fighting under the banner of unshakable faith are made of something more than flesh, but they are not made of impervious steel. The flesh must yield at last, endurance melts away, and the end of the battle must come.

Bataan has fallen, but the spirit that made it stand—a beacon to all the liberty-loving peoples of the world—cannot fall!

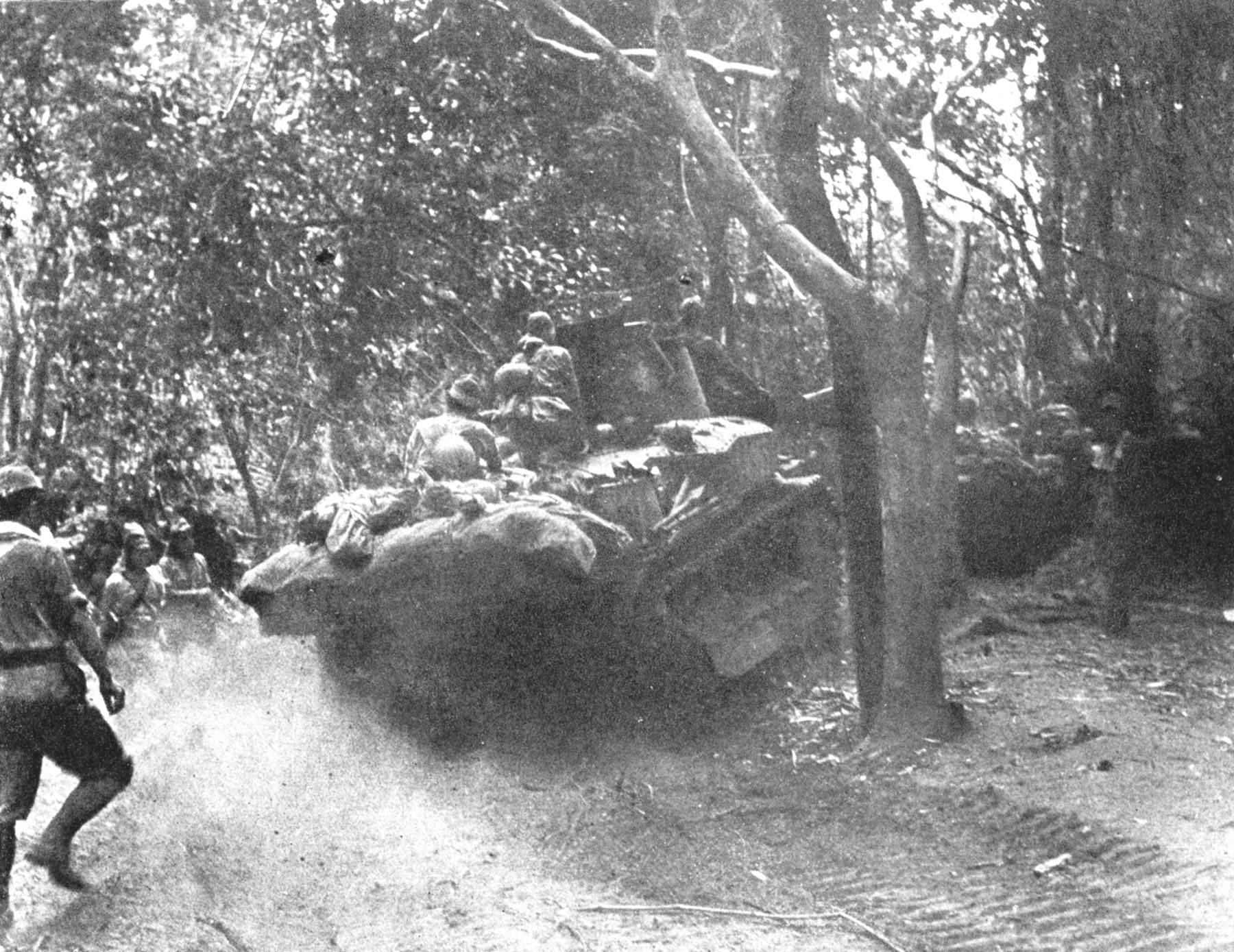
Japanese tanks and infantry advance through the Bataan jungle.

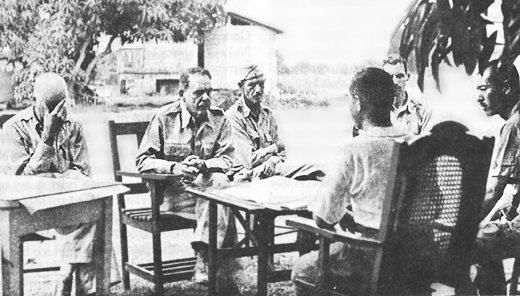
Major General Edward King discusses terms of surrender with Japanese officers.

== Aftermath ==
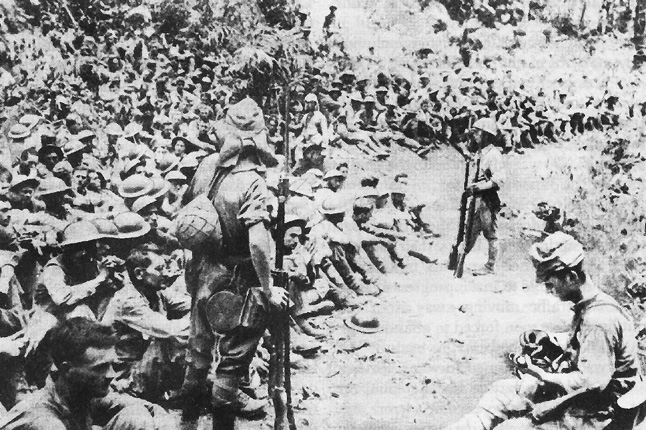
Japanese soldiers guard American and Filipino prisoners of war.

The continued resistance of the force on Bataan after Singapore and the Indies had fallen made heartening news among the Allied peoples. However, the extension of time gained by the defense was very largely a result of the transfer of the 48th Division from Homma's army at a critical time, and the exhaustion of the weakened force that remained. It cost a far stronger Japanese army as many days of actual combat to take Malaya and Singapore Island as it cost Homma to take Bataan and Corregidor.

The surrender of Bataan hastened the fall of Corregidor a month later. There is a suggestion that without the stand, the Japanese might have quickly overrun all of the U.S. bases in the Pacific and could have quickly invaded Australia. Willoughby, MacArthur's intelligence officer, asserted after the war that the epic operation in Bataan and Corregidor became a decisive factor in the ultimate winning of the war, that it disrupted the Japanese timetable "in a way that was to prove crucial" and that "because of Bataan the Japanese never managed to detach enough men, planes, ships, and material to nail down Guadalcanal." According to Gavin Long, rather than allowing the operations on Luzon to upset their general timetable, the Japanese took steps that resulted in prolonging the resistance of Luzon in order to speed up their conquest of the Indies. Between the time of their advance into the Solomons and the American counter-landing on Guadalcanal in August, three months after the fall of Corregidor, they had ample troops available to build up their strength in the South Seas.

However, historian Teodoro Agoncillo argues that the battle was "unnecessary in so far as the throwing away of precious lives was concerned, for it served no strategic purpose." It was only Yamashita who thought of invading Australia, something that Tojo did not support. USAFFE possessed numerical superiority and could have recaptured Manila easily, according to Homma.

The Japanese were greatly delayed in their overall timetable (not including the well-executed and rapid Dutch East Indies campaign) by the last stands at Bataan and Corregidor, which can be proven by how the Imperial General Headquarters was not satisfied with the slow pace of the Bataan and Corregidor battles because the original expectation for the Japanese forces was to defeat USAFFE forces and achieve complete victory in the Philippines by the middle of February. The withdrawal of the Asiatic Fleet in late December 1941 from the Philippines as well as the abandoning of the Philippines by the Pacific Fleet due to the Attack on Pearl Harbor gave the Japanese high expectations of a sudden collapse and surrender of MacArthur's forces within a month. Homma was relieved of command after the final Allied forces surrendered in the Philippines in June 1942 and he was humiliated and scapegoated for this major loss of face for the Japanese military. He served at a desk as a powerless reserve officer in Japan for the rest of the war.

Ultimately, more than 60,000 Filipino and 15,000 American prisoners of war were forced into the Bataan Death March. However, about 10,000–12,000 of these eventually escaped from the march to form guerrilla units in the mountains, tying down the occupying Japanese. On 7 September 1944 the Japanese ship Shinyō Maru was sunk by USS Paddle; on board the Shinyo Maru were U.S. POWs, of whom 668 died and 82 survived.

After more than two years of fighting in the Pacific, MacArthur initiated the Campaign for the Liberation of the Philippines, fulfilling his promise to return to the country he had left in 1942. As part of the campaign, the Battle for the recapture of Bataan avenged the surrender of the defunct USAFFE to invading Japanese forces.

== Legacy ==
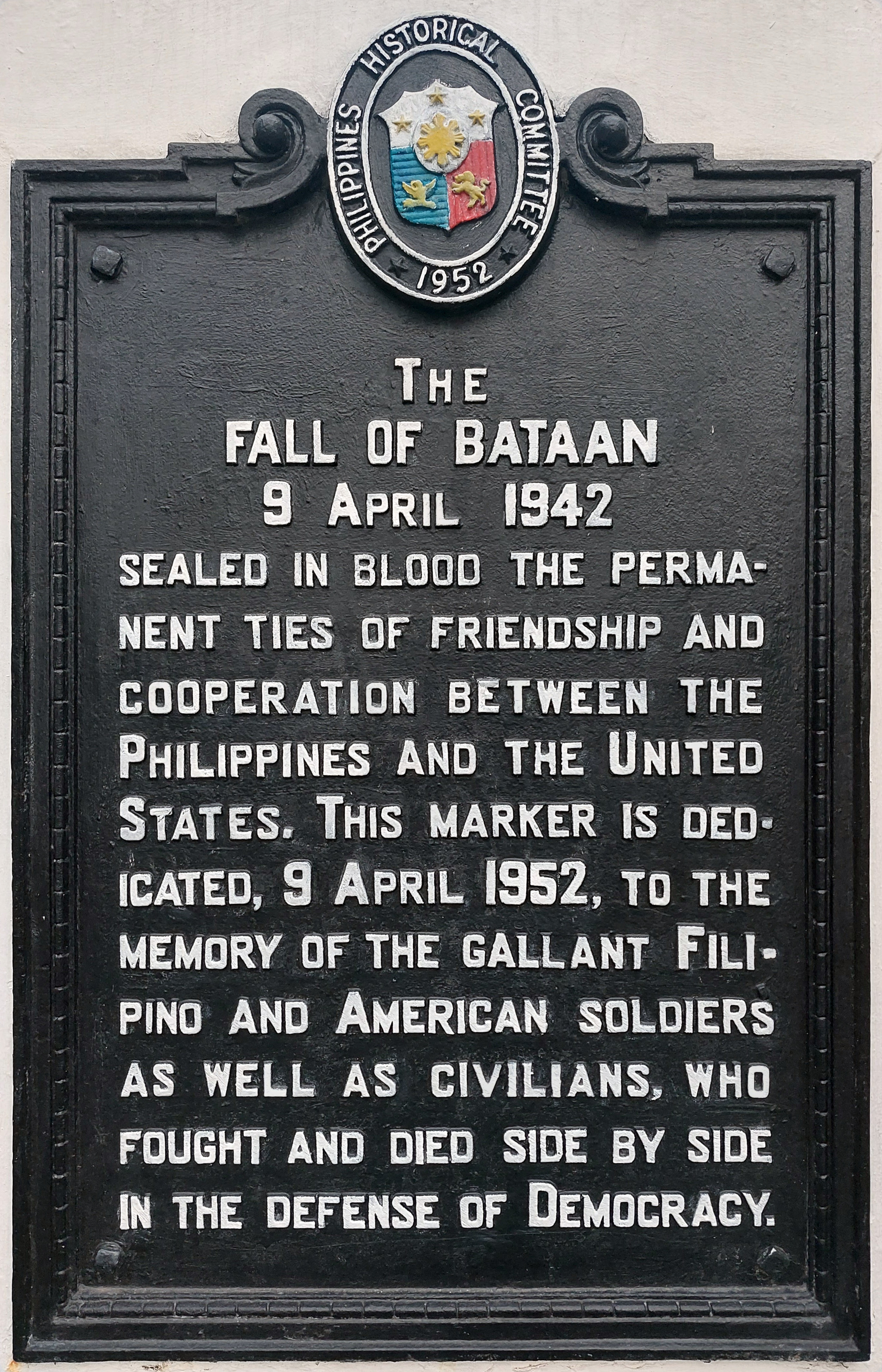
Fall of Bataan historical marker, Bataan Provincial Capitol grounds

9 April, the day Bataan fell into Japanese hands, was declared a national holiday in the Philippines. Previously called Bataan Day, the day is now known as Day of Valor or Araw ng Kagitingan, commemorating both the Fall of Bataan and the Fall of Corregidor. The Dambana ng Kagitingan (Shrine of Valor) is a war memorial erected on top of Mount Samat. The memorial grounds feature a colonnade that houses an altar, esplanade, and a museum. On the peak of the mountain is the memorial cross standing about 311 ft (95 m) high.

USS Bataan (LHD-5), commissioned on 20 September 1997, the United States Navy Wasp-class amphibious assault ship commemorates "those who served and sacrificed in the Philippines in the name of freedom in the Pacific". USS Bataan (CVL-29), commissioned on 17 November 1943, the United States Navy Independence-class aircraft carrier commemorated "those who served and sacrificed in the Philippines in the name of freedom in the Pacific" until her decommissioning on 9 April 1954.

The Bataan Death March Memorial Monument, erected in April 2001, is the only monument funded by the U.S. federal government dedicated to the victims of the Bataan Death March during World War II. The memorial was designed and sculpted by Las Cruces artist Kelley Hester and is located in Veterans Park along Roadrunner Parkway in New Mexico.

Bataan-Corregidor Memorial Bridge is a bascule bridge on State Street in Chicago, Illinois, where it crosses the Chicago River. It was built in 1949 and rededicated on 9 April 1998, commemorating the Day of Valor as well as the centennial of the declaration of Philippine independence from Spain in 1898.

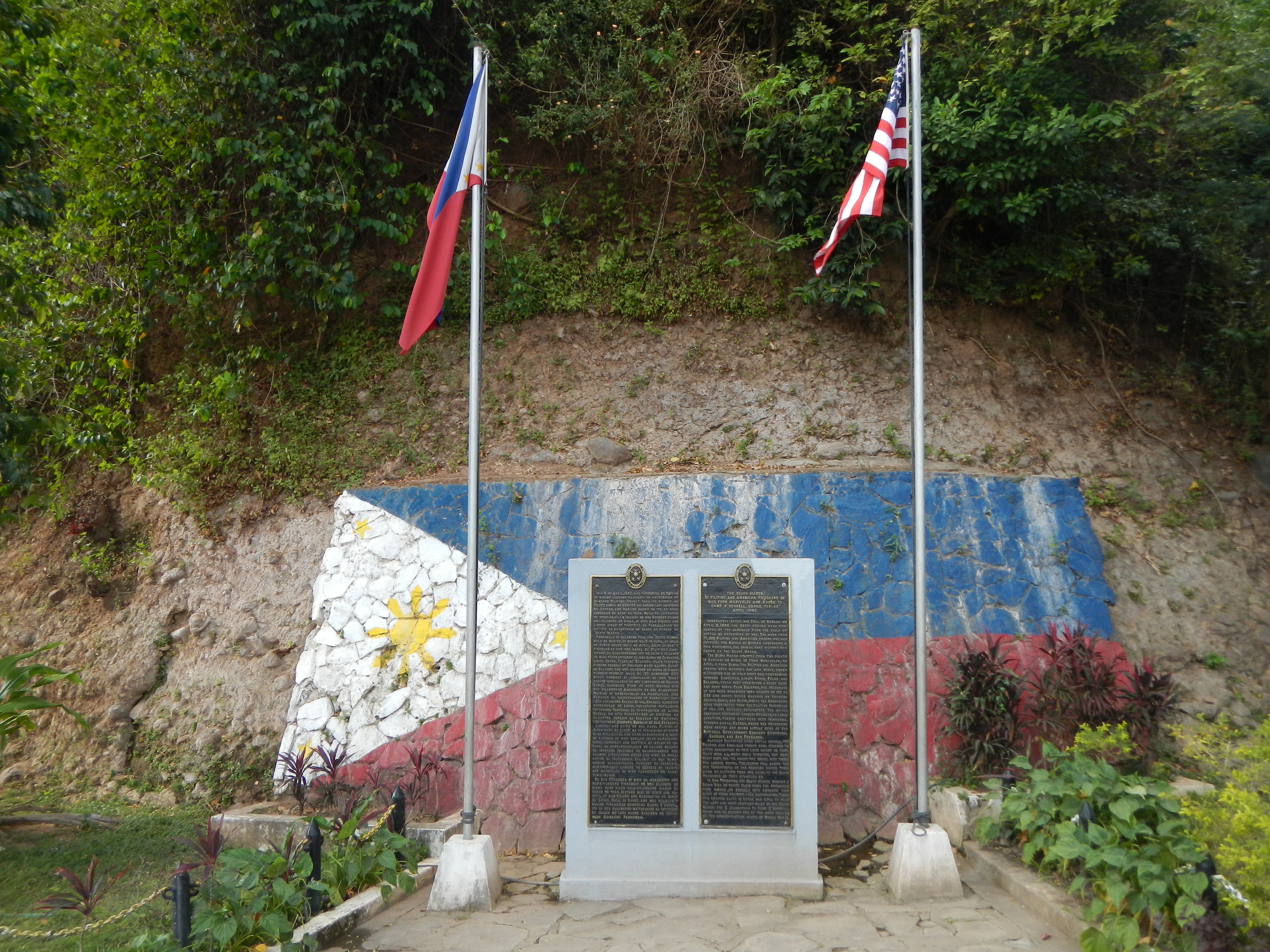
Mariveles, Bataan Memorial Shrine (Km. Zero, starting point of Death March, 9–17 April 1942)

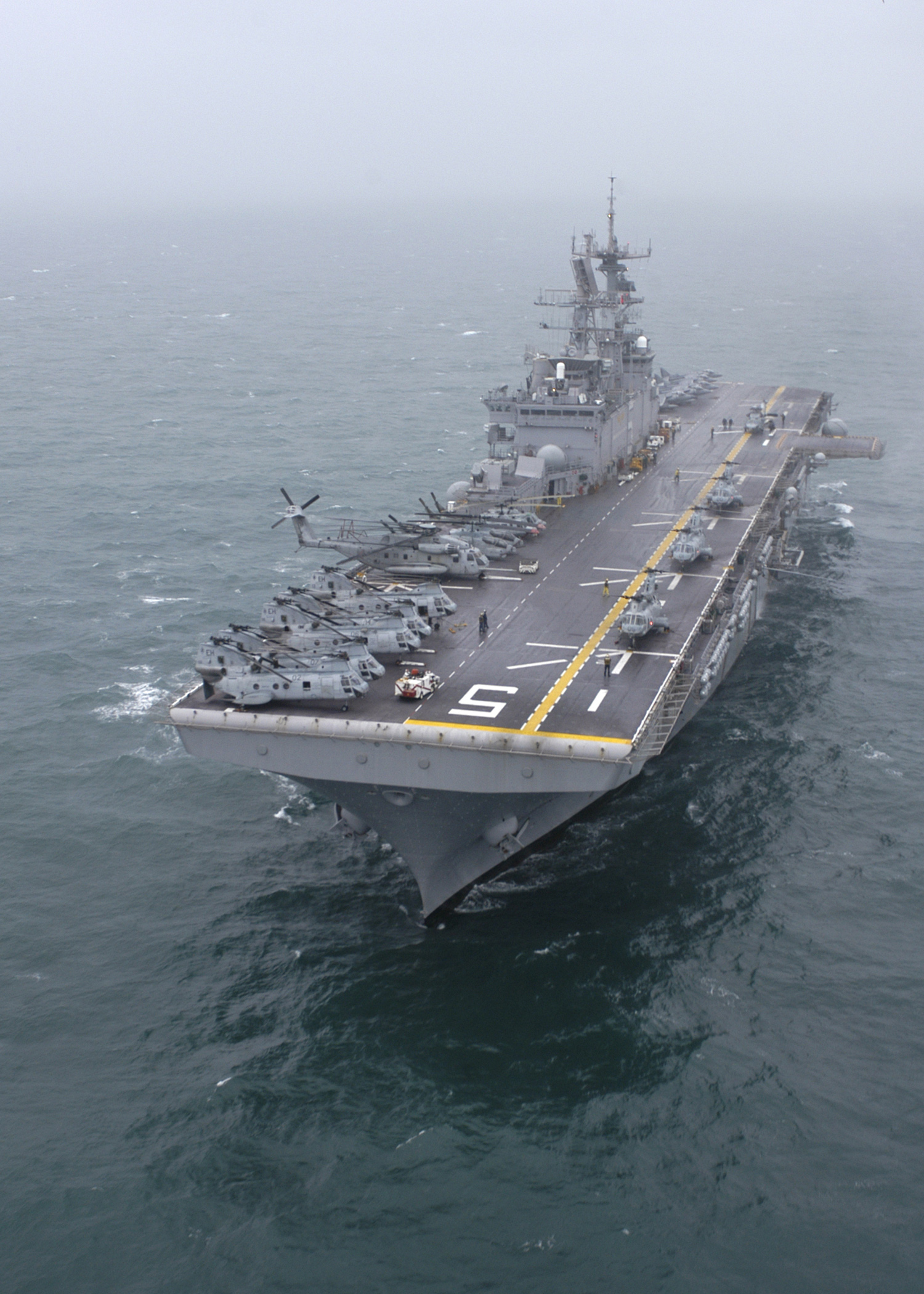
USS Bataan (LHD-5)

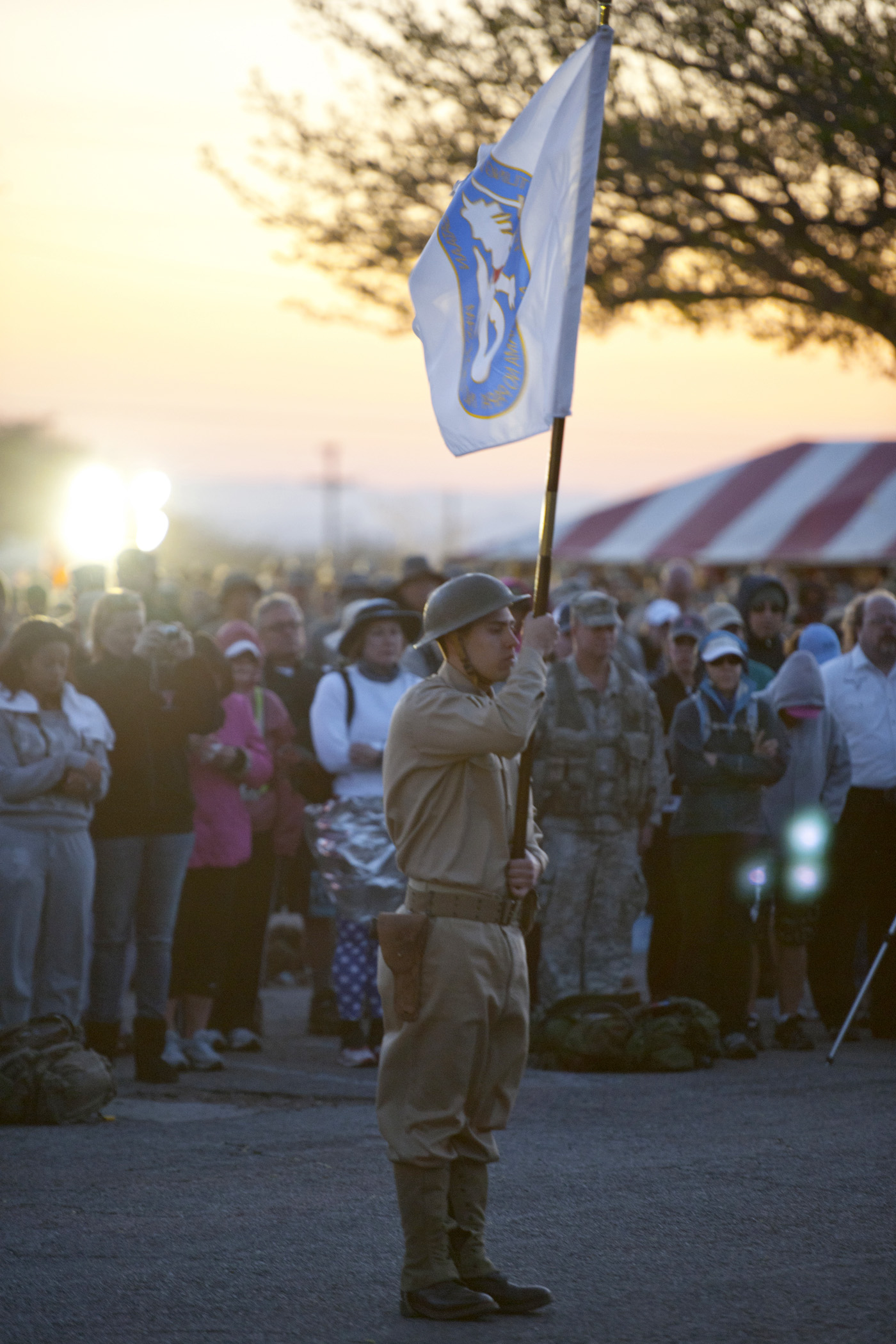
A U.S. Army member posts the flag of the "Battling Bastards of Bataan" at the opening ceremony of the Bataan Memorial Death March.

== In film, television and song ==
Among the many films and television programs that feature the story of Bataan are Bataan (1943) starring Robert Taylor; the John Ford classic They Were Expendable (1945), starring Robert Montgomery, John Wayne, and Donna Reed; Back to Bataan (1945) starring Wayne and Anthony Quinn; and two movies about the nurses of Bataan: So Proudly We Hail! (1943) and Cry 'Havoc' (1943).

Dozens of documentaries have also featured stories from the Battle of Bataan including A Legacy of Heroes: The Story of Bataan and Corregidor (2003), Ghosts of Bataan (2005) and an episode of The History Channel series Shootout, entitled "Raid on the Bataan Death Camp" (2006). Though largely focusing on the Cabanatuan Raid in 1945, this last program also featured stories from the 1942 battle; notably the stand of the 57th Infantry Regiment (PS) at Mabatang.

The Battle of Bataan is referenced among important battles of American history in the song "The House I Live In", sang by Frank Sinatra in the film of the same name and later taken up by Paul Robeson and various other singers: "The little bridge at Concord, where Freedom's fight began, / Our Gettysburg and Midway, and the story of Bataan".

== See also ==
- Angels of Bataan
- Frank Adamo – called by Life magazine "Bataan's medical hero"
- Wenceslao Vinzons – Filipino guerrilla leader who resisted until 8 July 1942.
