= USS Villalobos =

Gunboat of the United States Navy

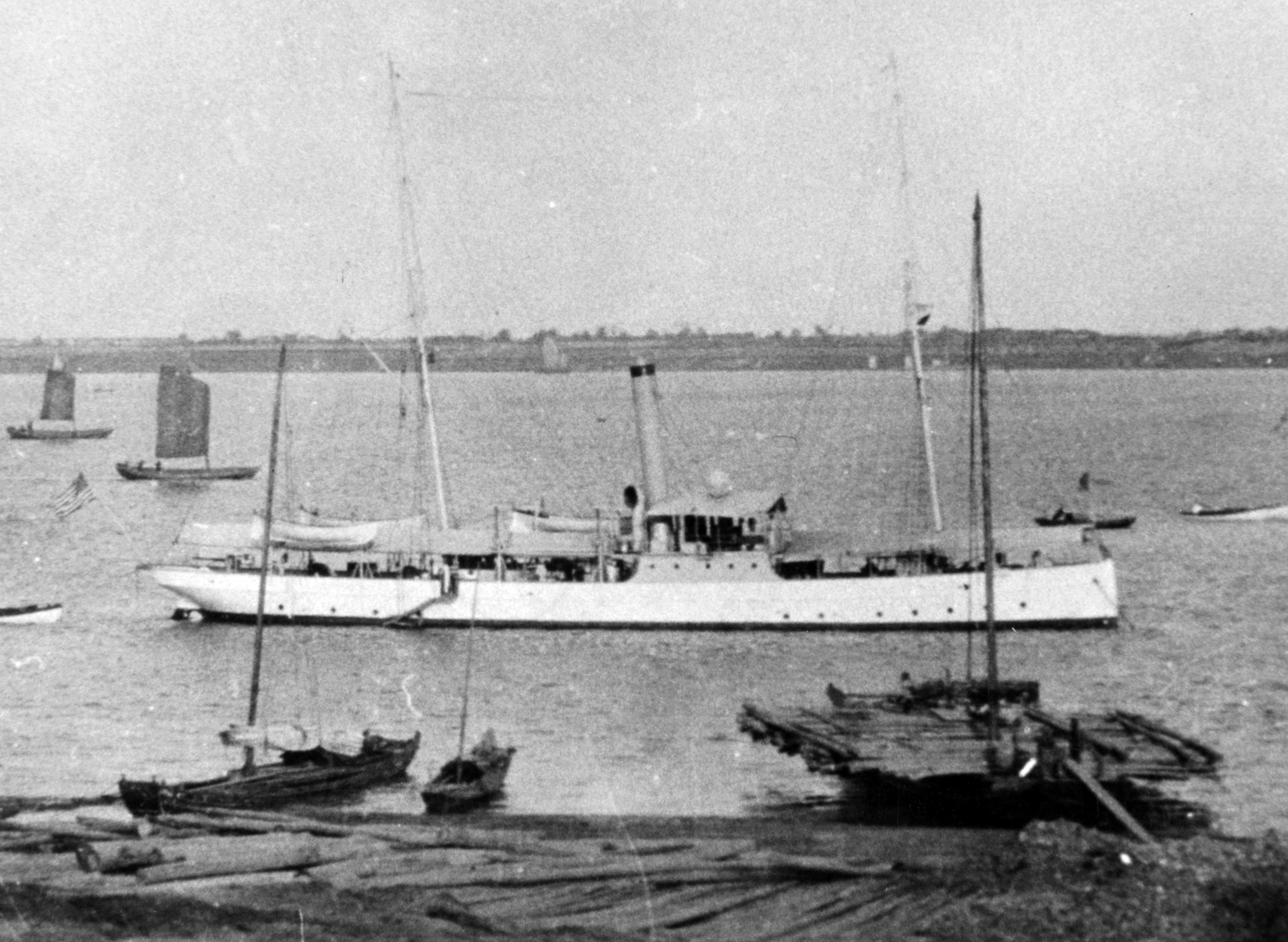

History

Spain
- Name: Villalobos
- Namesake: Ruy López de Villalobos, 16th Century Spanish explorer
- Builder: Hong Kong and Whampoa Dock Company, Hong Kong
- Laid down: September 1895
- Launched: July 1896
- Fate: Captured by the United States Army during the Spanish–American War

United States
- Name: USS Villalobos, Gunboat No. 42 (PG-42 from 17 July 1920)
- Acquired: 21 February 1900
- Commissioned: 5 March 1900
- Decommissioned: 29 May 1928
- Stricken: 4 October 1928
- Fate: Expended in US Naval gunnery exercise off China coast, 9 October 1928

General characteristics
- Type: Gunboat
- Displacement: 270 long tons (274 t)
- Length: 156 ft 2 in (47.60 m)
- Beam: 23 ft (7.0 m)
- Draft: 7 ft 6 in (2.29 m)
- Speed: 11 knots (20 km/h; 13 mph)
- Complement: 57
- Armament: 4 × 3-pounders; 2 × 1-pounders

USS Villalobos (PG-42) was a steel screw gunboat originally built for the Spanish Navy as Villalobos but captured by the United States Army in 1898 during the Spanish–American War and commissioned into the United States Navy in 1900. The ship spent almost all of her life as an American gunboat in the Yangtze Patrol on the Yangtze River.

== Spanish Navy service ==
The ship was constructed in Hong Kong for the Spanish Navy. After completion in July 1896 she was based at Cavite, Philippine Islands, at the time of the Spanish–American War and the following Philippine–American War.

== United States Navy service ==
Captured by the United States Army along with near-sisters General Alava and Quiros, Villalobos was transferred to the United States Navy on 21 February 1900 and commissioned at Cavite on 5 March 1900 as Villalobos (Gunboat No. 42). The ship was reclassified as Villalobos (PG-42) on 17 July 1920.

== Philippines, 1900–1902 ==
Departing Cavite on 13 March, Villalobos patrolled off the coast from Cape Santiago to Point Cueva, Buriad Island, maintaining a communication link with the marines guarding lighthouses at Santiago and Malabrigo and looking for traffic supplying the Philippine insurgents. Before the ship returned to her home port on the 26th, she had destroyed seven bancas (small native boats) with cargo worth $935.00 and also seized a brigantine, a schooner, and a banca which had all been engaged in smuggling.

After a brief rest at Cavite from 26 March to 1 April, Villalobos patrolled the coastline between Niac and Laguimanoc and cooperated with an Army detachment from Taal in seizing three bancas in the barrio of Hanahana and 11 at the barrio of San Luiz, towing them to Taal for not having licenses. The gunboat also seized a sloop and a banca with two Americans on board and arrested them for cruising without proper identification and papers. Her third patrol from Cavite, commencing on 14 April, saw the ship transporting stores to the guards at Cape Santiago, Cape Malabrigo, and Cabra Island lighthouses before resuming routine communication duties with Army detachments at Batangas, Lucena, and Laguimanoc.

Her fourth patrol from Cavite found her returning to the vicinity of Laguimanoc, along the southwest coast of Luzon. She cooperated with USS Indiana and USS Helena in supporting the 29th Army Division in securing Marinduque Island. The gunboat then carried dispatches from Marinduque to Batangas before returning with emergency rations for the troops. Furnishing supplies to the lighthouse keepers again occupied the ship before she returned to commerce-watching duties during which she seized three bancas for cruising without licenses. The ship also communicated with Army posts at Taal, Batangas, Laguimanoc, Buac, Santa Cruz, and visited Gazan.

She returned to Cavite on 10 May for a ten-day respite. Underway again on the 20th, she headed for the familiar region of the southwest coast of Luzon to resume her watch on local banca traffic and to serve as a communication link for Army posts with the "outside world." Villalobos seized three more bancas for operating without licenses and one for having insurgent papers on board, establishing a link between the last boat owner and forces then fighting the new American occupiers.

Army-cooperation duties included supporting the Army's landing detachments including the 30th Infantry at Bana Layley, and the 38th and 29th Infantry at Santa Cruz and Marlango. She then steamed back to Buac before supporting operations of the 30th Infantry at Unisan. During the land operations of the 28th Infantry, Villalobos blockaded Maricabau Strait and subsequently served on blockade duty off Nasugbu at the request of the American military governor there before carrying dispatches to Buac.

For the remainder of the year 1900 and into 1902, Villalobos conducted patrols in support of Army forces similar to those she had been carrying out since she was first commissioned. She continued to work off the northern and western coasts of Luzon and off Cebu. In between deployments, she was repaired at Cavite before returning to patrol duty in which she supported the Army occupation of Samar. On 20 November 1902, the gunboat was decommissioned at Cavite.

== Yangtze River Patrol, 1903–1928 ==
Recommissioned on 21 January 1903, Villalobos immediately commenced fitting out for service on the Yangtze River. She departed for China on 7 February and stopped at Dasol Bay, Philippines, from 8–14 February to conduct a "hydrographic reconnaissance" of the bay in company with gunboat Elcano, tender Callao, and collier Pompey.

Underway again on the 14 February 1903, the squadron put into Hong Kong on 17 February and remained there until 26 February, when Villalobos, in company with Pompey and Elcano, sailed for Shantou, China. Leaving the collier at Shantou, Villalobos and Elcano proceeded to Pagoda Anchorage and thence to Shanghai to inaugurate the United States Navy's Yangtze River Patrol. After a brief visit to this key Chinese seaport city, Villalobos pushed up the Yangtze on 27 March to Jiangyin to investigate conditions there and to check on the welfare of the American citizens.

At this time China had become a collection of feuding states governed by warlords. The Boxer Rebellion three years previously had resulted in the Boxer Protocol which gave eight foreign powers the right to station forces in the country to protect their nationals.

Villalobos steamed, in company with Elcano, to Zhenjiang and thence via Nanjing and Wuhu to Hankou where she arrived on 10 April. She spent the next five days awaiting a favorable rise in the river level to permit passage to Yichang before she got underway on the 15th for Chenglin, Yuezhou, and Shashi. After arriving at Yichang on 19 April, the ship headed back downriver and returned to Hankou on 5 May to investigate the possibility of making passage to Changsha for needed supplies. Proceeding thence to Yuezhou and Jinjiwan, she met a party of American engineers mapping out a route for the Hankou-Canton Railway.

=== International incident ===
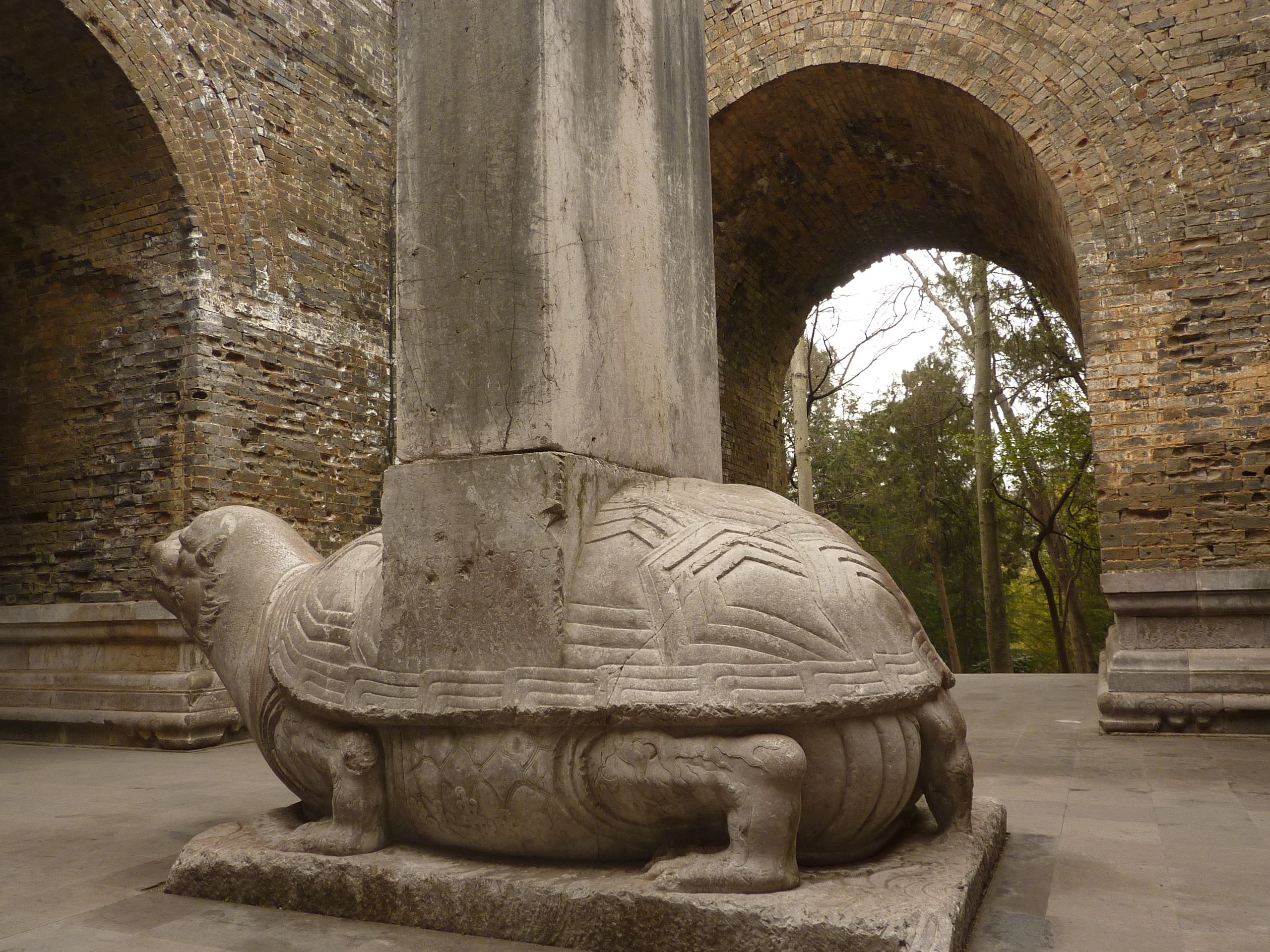
Graffiti scratched by sailors from USS Villalobos can still be seen on the flank of this stone turtle in Nanjing's Ming Xiaoling

Cruising subsequently to Changsha, Xiangtan, Zhuzhou, Yuezhou, and Hankou, Villalobos set out on 1 June for Jiujiang. She waited three days for a pilot for passage up the Gan River and Poyang Lake and, when one was finally obtained, got underway for Nanchang. However, the river level had fallen rapidly and Villalobos could proceed no further, so sent a whaleboat upstream for Nanchang to reconnoiter in accordance with orders from Rear Admiral Robley D. Evans, Commander in Chief, Asiatic Fleet, who had wired the gunboat to investigate local conditions there.

On 6 June, the boat returned and reported that all was quiet at Nanchang, and Villalobos headed back downriver. En route downriver, the gunboat's commander received a letter, via the American consul, from the local Governor who strongly protested Villalobos' visit—a protest which the consul seemed to sanction. When word reached Admiral Evans, he responded that a French gunboat had earlier made the same trip and had followed the same procedures, and it had gone without a protest from the local Chinese authorities.

"Your visit with the Villalobos to Nanchang," wrote Evans to Villalobos' commander, "for the purpose of investigating the condition and providing for the protection of the lives and property of Americans is approved." The admiral continued: "It is my desire that, so far as practicable, similar visits be paid to all Americans having property or other lawful interests in China, that I may be kept fully informed regarding all things concerning their welfare." Referring to the governor's contention that the gunboats should stay away since the inhabitants of the district were "bad men," Evans responded that this was all the more reason for more frequent visits.

Evans authorized Villalobos' commanding officer to inform any Chinese officials who might raise similar objections that the Fleet's gunboats "are always amply provided for dealing with 'bad men.'" The admiral admonished that if anything other than "proper respect" was shown to Americans in China, "severe and lasting punishment" would be meted out by his gunboats. As if that were not enough, Evans wrote, "Our gunboats will continue to navigate Poyang Lake and other inland waters of China, wherever Americans may be, and where, by treaty with China, they are authorized to engage in business or reside for the purpose of spreading the Gospel."

When word of Evans' stand reached the American minister to China in Beijing, Edward Conger, he sided with the governor. Conger asked Evans by what authority he had sanctioned Villalobos' visit to Nanchang. The admiral responded that he had acted under no specific treaty—but on the broad principle of extending American protection to wherever his country's nationals resided. While communications between widely separated places often took weeks or even months and the matter passed to Washington and the State and Navy Departments, American gunboats continued to patrol Poyang Lake.

John Hay, the Secretary of State, wrote to Conger siding with Evans, whose position he considered "proper and correct." Furthermore, Evans at the time had had no knowledge of treaties that indirectly applied to American rights in China although they had been made with other nations. Article 52 of the Anglo-Chinese 1858 Treaties of Tianjin, made reference to "most-favored nation" treatment—unbeknownst to Evans—and applied directly to Villalobos' controversial visit. The admiral had thus established a precedent for the Asiatic Fleet that would be carried on until late in the 1930s.

Villalobos remained deployed on the Yangtze River, until 1928, through various reorganizations and designations of what eventually became known as the "Yangtze Patrol", of the United States Asiatic Fleet.

=== World War I ===
During World War I, the belligerent nations either withdrew their ships from Chinese waters or saw them interned. The vacuum thus created by the internment or redeployment of British, French, and German gunboats on the Yangtze left only the Americans available to "keep the peace." However, no major wars between factions and warlords occurred.

America's entry into the war soon resulted in internment for United States gunboats. While Wilmington (Gunboat No. 8) sailed for Manila within the allotted time to avoid forced internment, Palos (River Gunboat No. 1), Monocacy (River Gunboat No. 2), Samar, Quiros, and Villalobos all remained at Shanghai— maintained at 75 percent complement and occupying their time with usual and routine ship's maintenance work—until China entered the war on the side of the Allied and Associated Powers on 16 August 1917. At that time, Villalobos and her sister gunboats resumed their patrolling and continued it through the armistice and into the postwar years.

=== 1920s ===
In March 1921, the home port for these elderly gunboats—Villalobos, Quiros, and Elcano—was changed from Manila to Shanghai. Villalobos—by now designated PG-42—patrolled the middle Yangtze in mid-1921, noting local conditions and continuing in her duty of standing ready to protect American interests. The first flag officer commanding the Yangtze Patrol, Rear Admiral William Bullard, felt that the venerable Villalobos and her near-sisters were "hopeless cases" in terms of upkeep, firepower, and living conditions; but they, nevertheless, remained on duty.

However, by this point, there was not much for them to do, as the conflict between the warlords commanding Szechwan and Hupeh provinces had placed trigger-happy soldiers along both banks of the upper river, preventing river traffic. Villalobos reported on 22 July 1921 that "business is at a standstill" on both the middle and upper Yangtze River.

For the next five years, Villalobos continued her usual river activities, with occasional periods of upkeep at the Chinese-owned Kiangnan Dock and Engineering Works.

=== Chinese Civil War ===
In late August 1926, there were indications that there could be action in store for the gunboat at Hankou as Communist forces were on the march. On 27 August 1926, the ship steamed upstream for Changsha, passing Chinese warships at Ganzhou, warlord troops along the banks, and the occasional corpse floating with the tide.

After anchoring for the night, Villalobos got underway the next day only to soon run aground on a sandbar. With the river dropping one foot per day, if the ship were not soon refloated, she would be there until winter. Help soon happened by when a British Butterfield and Swire Line tug appeared towing a lighter.

Villalobos' crew transferred nearly everything portable—including ammunition and stores—to the tug's lighter. At the same time, Pigeon (AM-47)—a Lapwing-class minesweeper converted to a river gunboat—came by as well, heading downstream from Changsha while the river still allowed her to pass downriver safely. With her decreased draft, the combined efforts of Pigeon and the tug freed Villalobos and she reloaded her stores and ammunition before resuming her passage.

After her delayed arrival, Villalobos remained at Changsha for the next four months until relieved by Palos on 28 February 1927. Proceeding downriver, Villalobos arrived at Hankou on 2 March 1927, joining Isabel—flagship of Commander, Yangtzee Patrol, Rear Admiral H. H. Hough; Truxtun; and Pope.

Chinese Nationalist forces entered Nanjing on 24 March and subjected American and British commercial installations to heavy attacks. On the 25, Lieutenant Commander Earl A. Mclntyre ordered his crew to place more steel boiler-plate around vital control and gun positions on board Villalobos in expectation of action. Within two weeks, riots broke out in Hankou and the Japanese section of the city was looted, prompting the Japanese to land forces. With the evacuation of Americans, Villalobos stood by, keeping watch on the scene with her guns cleared for action.

Ordered downriver to guard the American-owned Socony-Vacuum Oil Company's installation, Villalobos joined British gunboats HMS Teal and HMS Scarab in an uneventful watch. Relieved by Palos on 27 May, Villalobos departed Hankou and the middle-river area and sailed for Shanghai with the orders to return fire if attacked.

Meanwhile, six replacement gunboats were being built for Yangtze duty. The Secretary of the Navy's report for 1927 stated that Villalobos was in bad condition as regarding both hull and machinery and had little sale value. On 29 December 1927, President Calvin Coolidge authorized the destruction of Villalobos by gunfire; and the gunboat was placed out of commission on 29 May 1928. Struck from the Navy list on 4 October, the venerable gunboat was towed to sea and sunk in experimental destroyer gunnery exercises off the China coast on 9 October 1928.

== The Sand Pebbles ==
USS Villalobos was the model for the fictional gunboat USS San Pablo portrayed in Richard McKenna's novel The Sand Pebbles, and in 1965 the producers of the 1966 film version of the novel spent US$250,000 on building a prop gunboat to depict the ship. However, the design chosen for the prop gunboat was more representative of 1928 river gunboats than of Villalobos.

== Awards ==
- Philippine Campaign Medal
- World War I Victory Medal
- Yangtze Service Medal
