= Alice Dollar incident =

River confrontation between American and rebel Chinese forces

- Part of the Yangtze Patrol
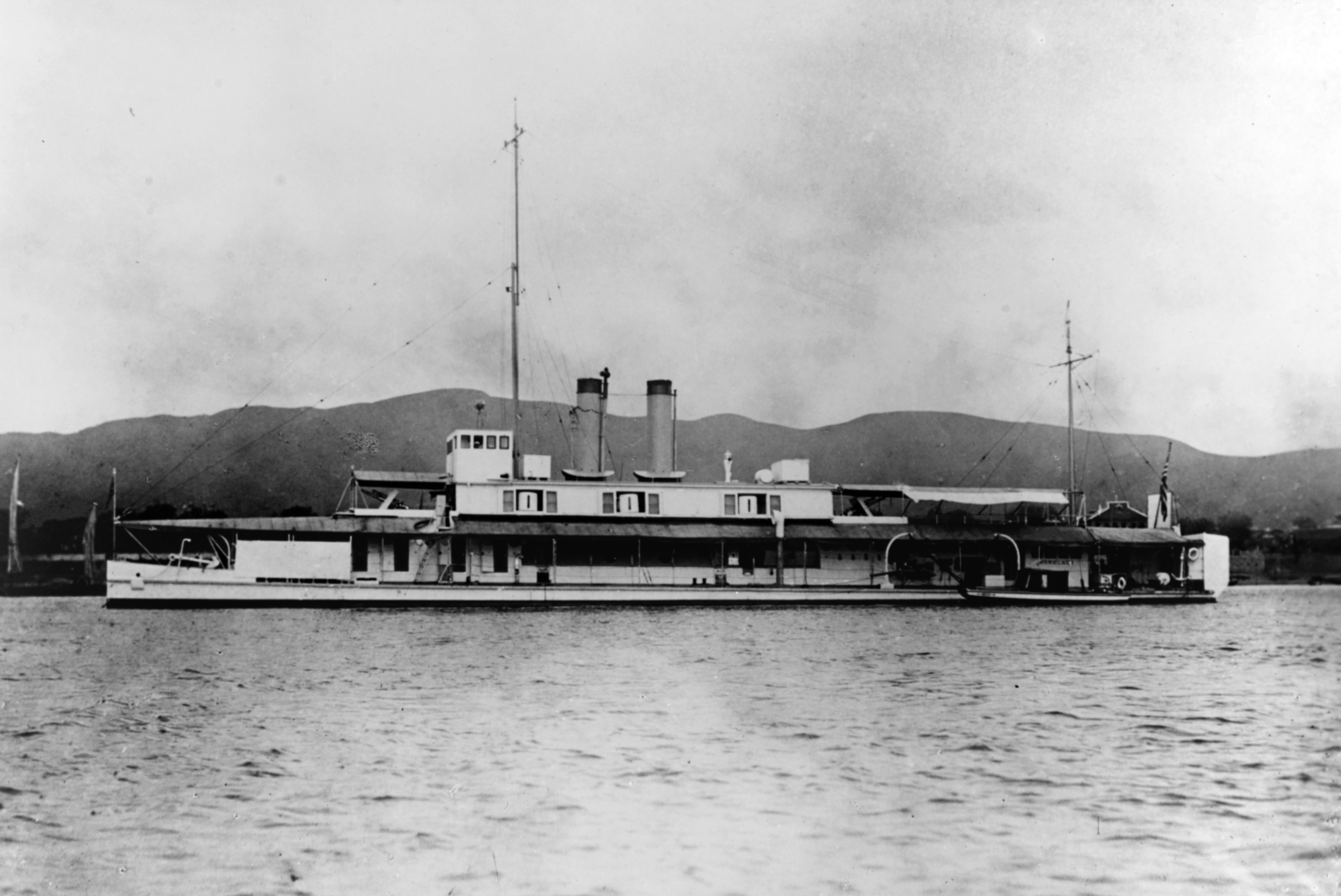
- USS Monocacy in China.
| Date | July 20–21, 1920 |
| Location | near Tang Chia To and Chongqing, Yangtze River, China |
| Result | United States victory |

Belligerents
| United States | Chinese rebels |

Commanders and leaders
| C. D. Gilroy | Unknown |

Strength
| 1 gunboat 1 steamer | Unknown |

Casualties and losses
| 2 wounded 1 gunboat damaged 1 steamer damaged | Unknown |

The Alice Dollar incident was an affair involving a United States-flagged merchant ship and an American warship in 1920. Chinese rebels along the Yangtze River attacked the SS Alice Dollar on July 20, so the gunboat USS Monocacy was assigned to escort the vessel out of the area. On the following day, during the operation, rebels attacked again but were silenced by American counter-fire.

== Incident ==
The Alice Dollar, of the Dollar Line, was steaming upriver to the treaty port of Tang Chia To in the day of July 20 when armed Chinese rebels, belonging to a local warlord, opened fire on the ship with small arms. The Americans were able to increase their speed and escape to port with minor damage and no casualties. Captain C. D. Gilroy, of USS Monocacy, was informed of the situation and asked to escort the merchant ship back down the river on the next day, July 21. While only four miles off Chongqing, Chinese rebels along the river again attacked from the north bank of the Yangtze. Due to other related incidents in the past, the crews of Monocacy's .30 in (7.62 mm) machine guns and 6 in (150 mm) cannons were immediately ordered to return fire.

Within just a few minutes and after firing six shells, the Chinese were in retreat but .5 mi (0.80 km) downriver, they attacked once more. The Americans again returned fire and shot several more shells and hundreds of bullets into the surrounding hills, forcing the rebels to abandon their attempt. Captain Gilroy estimated that his ship was fired on 600 times though only 15 bullet holes were counted and two men were slightly wounded. After the affair, the U.S. consul in Chongqing demanded and received a Chinese apology but no restitution was requested.

== See also ==
- General Sherman incident
- Gunboat diplomacy
