= USS Pompey =

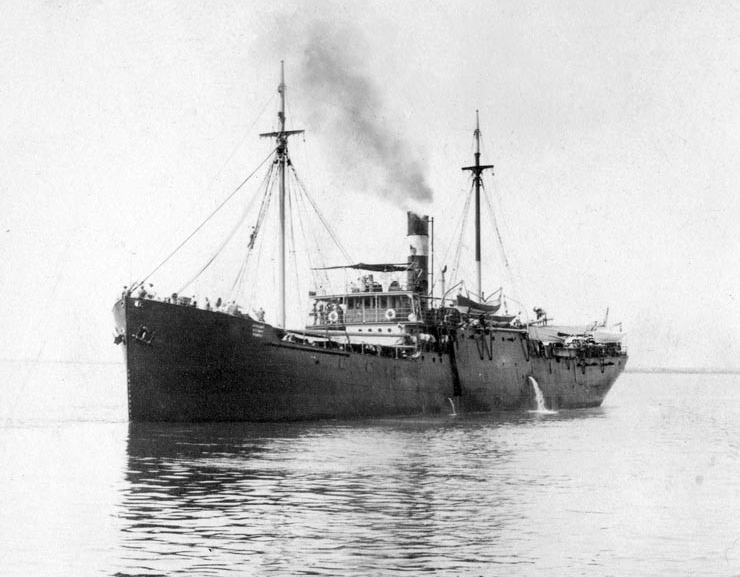

History

United States
- Name: USS Pompey
- Namesake: Pompey
- Builder: S.P. Austin and Sons, Ltd., Sunderland, England
- Launched: 1 April 1897
- Acquired: by purchase, 19 April 1898
- Commissioned: 26 May 1898
- Decommissioned: 5 July 1921
- Stricken: 28 March 1922
- Identification: AF-5, from July 1920
- Fate: Sold into commercial service, 1923; Bombed and sunk, 29 December 1941

General characteristics
- Type: Freighter
- Tonnage: 1,285 GRT
- Displacement: 3,085 long tons (3,135 t)
- Length: 245 ft (75 m)
- Beam: 33 ft 6 in (10.21 m)
- Draft: 15 ft 10 in (4.83 m)
- Speed: 10 knots (19 km/h; 12 mph)
- Complement: 114
- Armament: None

USS Pompey (AF-5) was an auxiliary ship of the United States Navy, acquired in 1898 for service in the Spanish–American War, which went on to serve as a collier, tender, and storeship in the Philippines, before being sold into commercial service after World War I. She was sunk by Japanese aircraft on 29 December 1941.

== Service history ==
The ship was built in 1897 by S.P. Austin and Sons, Ltd. of Sunderland, England, as the freighter SS Harlech. She was purchased by the U.S. Navy from James and Charles Harrison of London, England, on 19 April 1898, and commissioned as USS Pompey at Naval Station Norfolk on 26 May 1898. She then served as a collier in Rear Admiral William T. Sampson's squadron off Cuba, returning to Norfolk on 23 August, and was decommissioned at the Philadelphia Navy Yard on 18 January 1899.

Pompey was recommissioned in 1901 to serve in the Asiatic Fleet, supporting U.S. forces in the Far East. In February 1903 Pompey accompanied the gunboats Elcano, Villalobos, and Callao, as they sailed from the Philippines to China to inaugurate the Yangtze River Patrol. Based on Shanghai from February 1903, their mission was to protect American citizens and property, and promote friendly relations with the Chinese.

Pompey was decommissioned at the Cavite Naval Station, Philippines, in June 1905. Placed back into commission in July 1906, she continued to serve as a collier on the Asiatic Station, apart from a period in 1907-1909 when she was assigned to the Pacific Fleet.

From 1911 she served as tender at Cavite to the five torpedo boat destroyers of the 1st Torpedo Flotilla (Bainbridge, Barry, Chauncey, Dale and Decatur) until decommissioned at the Olongapo Naval Station in February 1916.

After being recommissioned in November 1917 Pompey served as a storeship – a role she had assumed at least part of the time as early as 1915. She received the hull code AF-5 in July 1920.

She was finally decommissioned on 5 July 1921 at Olongapo, and struck from the Navy List on 28 March 1922. She was transferred to the War Department on 12 July 1922, and by 1923 had become the Philippine merchant ship Pompey.

She was renamed Samal in 1931, and was sunk by Japanese bombing at Pier 7, Manila on 29 December 1941.
