= AG-5 =

AG-5 or Ag-5 may refer to:

- USS General Alava (AG-5), a cargo ship acquired by the US Navy during the Spanish–American War
- Bell 47, a two-seat agricultural version of the Bell 47G-5 light helicopter later known as the Ag-5

== See also ==
- AG5 (disambiguation)
