= AG5 =

AG5 may refer to:

- 2011 AG_{5} (also written 2011 AG5), a near-Earth asteroid and potentially hazardous object
- Pandan Indah LRT station, a Malaysian at-grade rapid transit station (code AG5)
- AG5, a 5-speed longitudinal transmission manufactured by Aisin Seiki

== See also ==
- AG-5 (disambiguation)
