= USS Palos =

Ship name

USS Palos may refer to the following ships of the United States Navy:

- USS Palos (1865), a tug built in 1865 and later converted to a gunboat. She was decommissioned in 1893.
- USS Palos (PG-16), a gunboat built for service in China's Yangtze River. She was decommissioned in 1937.
