= USS Elcano =

Gunboat

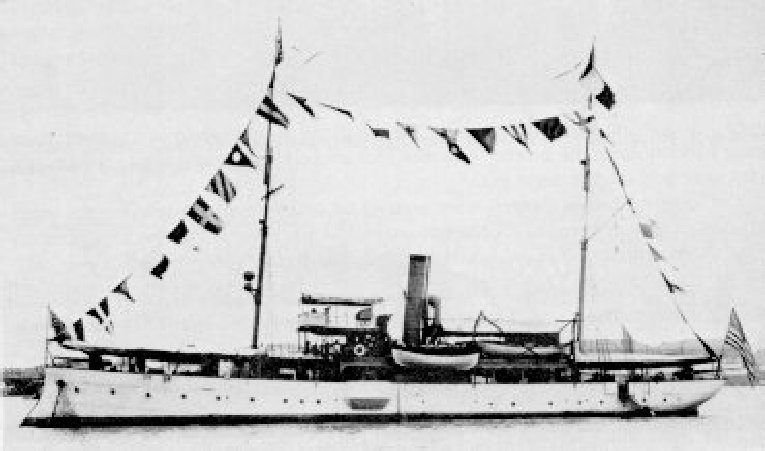
- USS Elcano

History

Spain
- Name: Elcano
- Ordered: 1882
- Laid down: 3 March 1882
- Launched: 28 January 1884
- Fate: War prize transferred to the U.S. Navy

United States
- Name: USS Elcano
- Acquired: 9 November 1898
- Commissioned: 20 November 1902
- Decommissioned: 30 June 1928
- Fate: Sunk as target, 4 October 1928

General characteristics
- Type: Gunboat
- Displacement: 620 long tons (630 t)
- Length: 165 ft 6 in (50.4 m)
- Beam: 26 ft (7.9 m)
- Draft: 10 ft (3.0 m)
- Installed power: 1,200 ihp (890 kW)
- Propulsion: 2 × vertical compound steam engines; 2 × single-ended Scotch boilers; 2 × screws
- Speed: 11 kn (13 mph; 20 km/h)
- Complement: Spanish Navy: 115; U.S. Navy: 103
- Armament: Initial: 4 × 4 in (100 mm)/40 guns; 4 × 6-pounder (57 mm (2.24 in)) guns; 1918: 4 × 4 in (100 mm)/50 guns; 4 × 3-pounder (47 mm (1.85 in)) guns

USS Elcano (PG-38) was a gunboat that the United States Navy captured from the Spanish Navy during the Spanish–American War. She was officially commissioned in the U.S. Navy in 1902. She served for many years in the Yangtze Patrol where she saw action against pirates and warlords. She served until decommissioning in 1928, when she was sunk for target practice.

== Service history ==
=== Spanish Navy ===
The Carraca Arsenal at Cadiz, Spain, built Elcano in 1885. The Spanish Navy stationed her at the Port of Manila, where she arrived on 26 September 1886.

During the Spanish–American War, she captured the American bark Saranac on 26 February 1898. Saranac—under Captain Bartaby—was carrying 1,640 short tons (1,490 t) of coal from Newcastle, New South Wales, to Iloilo, for Admiral Dewey's fleet.

The Americans seized Elcano during the Battle of Manila Bay on 1 May 1898. She was officially turned over to the US Navy on 9 November 1898.

=== U.S. Navy ===
The U.S. Navy had Elcano fitted at the Cavite Naval Yard, Philippines, for use as a gunboat. The U.S. Navy commissioned her on 20 November 1902 as the USS Elcano, Gunboat No. 38, under her first captain, Lieutenant Commander A.G. Winterhalter.

Elcano left Manila on 26 December 1902 for service with what would become the U.S. Yangtze Patrol. She sailed with another ex-Spanish gunboat—Villalobos—and the collier Pompey; the little flotilla arrived in Shanghai in February 1903.

The gunboats' task was primarily to protect American lives and property in China, especially American-flagged vessels operating on the Yangtze River. The U.S. had sent gunboats to China in the past, but this flotilla was the first that the U.S. Navy had created specifically to patrol the Yangtze. However, they were not well-suited to river patrol because of their deep (ocean-going) draft and their weak power.

Still, Elcano remained based in Shanghai until 20 October 1907. She then returned to Cavite where the U.S. Navy decommissioned her on 1 November.

The U.S. Navy recommissioned Elcano on 5 December 1910 and she returned to China in March 1911. There she was based at Amoy until the start of World War I. She returned to Manila in April 1917, and then patrolled off Mariveles, Bataan, and Corregidor Island until the end of the war.

Elcano returned to Shanghai on 3 February 1920 where she rejoined the Yangtze Patrol. On 17 July, the Navy reclassified her as PG-38 (Patrol Gunboat 38).

As a member of the Yangtze River Patrol Elcano was involved in numerous skirmishes with Chinese warlords and pirates. In July 1921, she assisted in the landing of U.S. Marines at Yichang, where she remained until September 1922. During the Northern Expedition, Elcano brought refugees back to the coast from deep inland. On 24 March 1927, during the Nanking incident, Elcano shelled the base of Socony Hill in Nanjing to protect the American Consul General and others who were being besieged there. Eventually, American sailors rescued the American civilians.

== Fate ==
In November 1927, Elcano became a receiving ship at Shanghai for American sailors arriving to man the new gunboats that the Navy was building for service with the Patrol. The U.S. Navy decommissioned Elcano on 30 June 1928. She sank on 4 October as a result of having been used for target practice.

== Awards ==
- World War I Victory Medal
- Yangtze Service Medal
