= USS Quiros =

Gunboat of the United States Navy

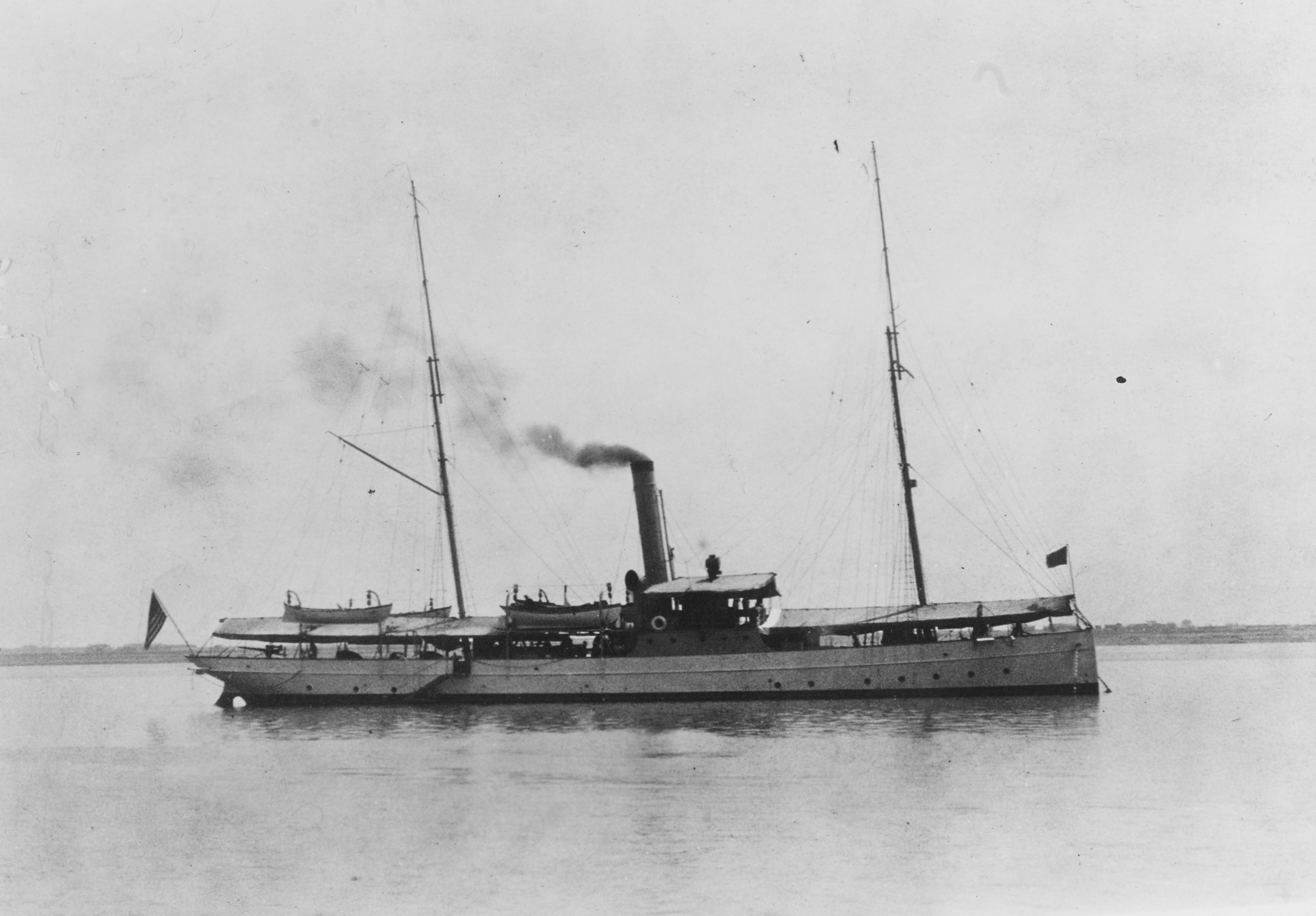
- USS Quiros

History

Spain
- Name: Quirós
- Namesake: Pedro Fernández de Quirós (1565–1614)
- Builder: Hong Kong and Whampoa Dock Company, Hong Kong
- Laid down: June 1894
- Launched: 1895
- Commissioned: 1896
- Fate: Captured by the United States 1898; Sold to United States 21 February 1900

United States
- Name: USS Quiros
- Namesake: Previous name retained
- Acquired: 21 February 1900
- Commissioned: 14 March 1900
- Decommissioned: 29 January 1904
- Recommissioned: 2 September 1904
- Decommissioned: 11 March 1908
- Recommissioned: 11 October 1910
- Out of service: Interned 5 May 1917
- In service: Released August 1917
- Decommissioned: 10 August 1923
- Fate: Sunk as target 16 October 1923

General characteristics (in Spanish Navy)
- Type: Gunboat
- Displacement: 347 long tons (353 t)
- Length: 44.3 m (145 ft 4 in)
- Beam: 6.9 m (22 ft 8 in)
- Draft: 2.3 m (7 ft 7 in)
- Propulsion: Triple-expansion engine, 500 hp (370 kW), one shaft, bunker capacity 75 tons of coal
- Sail plan: Schooner rig
- Speed: 12 knots (22 km/h; 14 mph)
- Range: 3,800 nautical miles (7,000 km; 4,400 mi)
- Complement: 37
- Armament: 2 × Hotchkiss 6-pounder quick-firing guns; 2 × Hotchkiss 3-pounder quick-firing guns

General characteristics (in United States Navy)
- Type: Gunboat
- Displacement: 350 long tons (356 t)
- Length: 145 ft (44 m)
- Beam: 22 ft 9 in (6.93 m)
- Draft: 7 ft 9 in (2.36 m)
- Speed: 11 knots (20 km/h; 13 mph)
- Complement: 57
- Armament: 2 × Hotchkiss 6-pounder quick-firing guns; 2 × Hotchkiss 3-pounder quick-firing guns

USS Quiros (PG-40), previously designated Gunboat No. 40, was a United States Navy gunboat in commission from 1900 to 1904, from 1904 to 1908, and from 1910 to 1923, seeing service in the Philippines and China. Prior to her U.S. Navy service, she was in commission in the Spanish Navy from 1896 to 1898 as Quirós, seeing service during the Philippine Revolution and the Spanish–American War.

== Construction and commissioning ==
Quirós was constructed as a schooner-rigged, composite gunboat for the Spanish Navy by the Hong Kong and Whampoa Dock Company in Hong Kong. She was laid down in June 1894, launched in early 1895, and commissioned into Spanish Navy service in 1896.

== Service history ==
=== Spanish Navy ===
Upon commissioning in 1896, Quirós deployed to the Philippine Islands, where she took part in operations against Filipino insurgents during the Philippine Revolution. During the Spanish–American War of April–August 1898, United States Army forces captured her at Manila. After the war, Spain ceded the Philippines to the United States, and the Spanish Navy considered steaming her from the Philippines to Spain, but decided against it after assessing the voyage as both cost-prohibitive and likely to fail. Spain sold her to the United States on 21 February 1900.

=== U.S. Navy ===
The U.S. Navy commissioned the gunboat at Cavite Navy Yard in the Philippines as USS Quiros (Gunboat No. 40) on 14 March 1900. Assigned to duty supporting the U.S. Army in the Philippine–American War, Quiros operated along the east coast of Luzon, carrying troops, providing fire support, blockading rebel villages, and making hydrographic surveys. She then switched to patrolling the Ulgan station, operating off the coast of Samar in cooperation with U.S. Army forces until 6 October 1901. She retired to Cavite for repairs from 25 February to 7 May 1902 and then proceeded to Zamboanga patrol station, where she cruised for a number of months, carrying U.S. Army troops and United States Marines on various missions. She was reported on 31 December 1903 to have gone aground on the Pearl Banks in the Sulu Sea off Borneo, but was reported on 15 January 1904 to have been refloated with minimal damage. She returned to Cavite and was decommissioned on 29 January 1904.

Quiros was recommissioned on 2 September 1904, and following service with the Philippine Squadron sailed for China, arriving at Shanghai on 3 August 1905. Operating along the China coast as far as Yantai, she then took up duties on the Yangtze Patrol, patrolling the Yangtze River, making a number of upriver trips to Hankou and one voyage as far as Yichang, 900 miles (1,400 km) inland, in May 1907. On 27 February 1908, she departed China for Cavite, arriving there on 8 March 1908 and decommissioning there on 11 March 1908.

Quiros recommissioned on 11 October 1910 and operated on patrol in Philippine waters for the next year. She departed the Philippines on 11 November 1911 bound for Amoy, China, then proceeded to Shanghai, where she again took up duties on the Yangtze Patrol. Quiros remained on Chinese river service for the rest of her career, carrying stores, supplying naval armed guards to river merchantmen, inspecting provinces, and protecting U.S. lives and property in China's interior. Quiros was interned at Shanghai on 5 May 1917 after the U.S. entry into World War I due to China's neutrality in the war, but an international agreement on the protection of nationals in China allowed her to resume patrolling in August 1917.

On 17 July 1920, when the U.S. Navy established its modern system of hull classification symbols, Quiros received the hull number "PG-40." She was decommissioned at Shanghai on 10 August 1923 and was used as a target until sunk by U.S. Navy destroyer gunfire off the coast of China on 16 October 1923.

== See also ==
- List of patrol vessels of the United States Navy

== Bibliography ==
- Zolandez, Thomas (2016). "Question 8/52: Ex-Spanish Gunboats Sunk as Targets off China". Warship International. LIII (1): 26–27. ISSN 0043-0374.
