= USS Palos (PG-16) =

Gunboat of the United States Navy

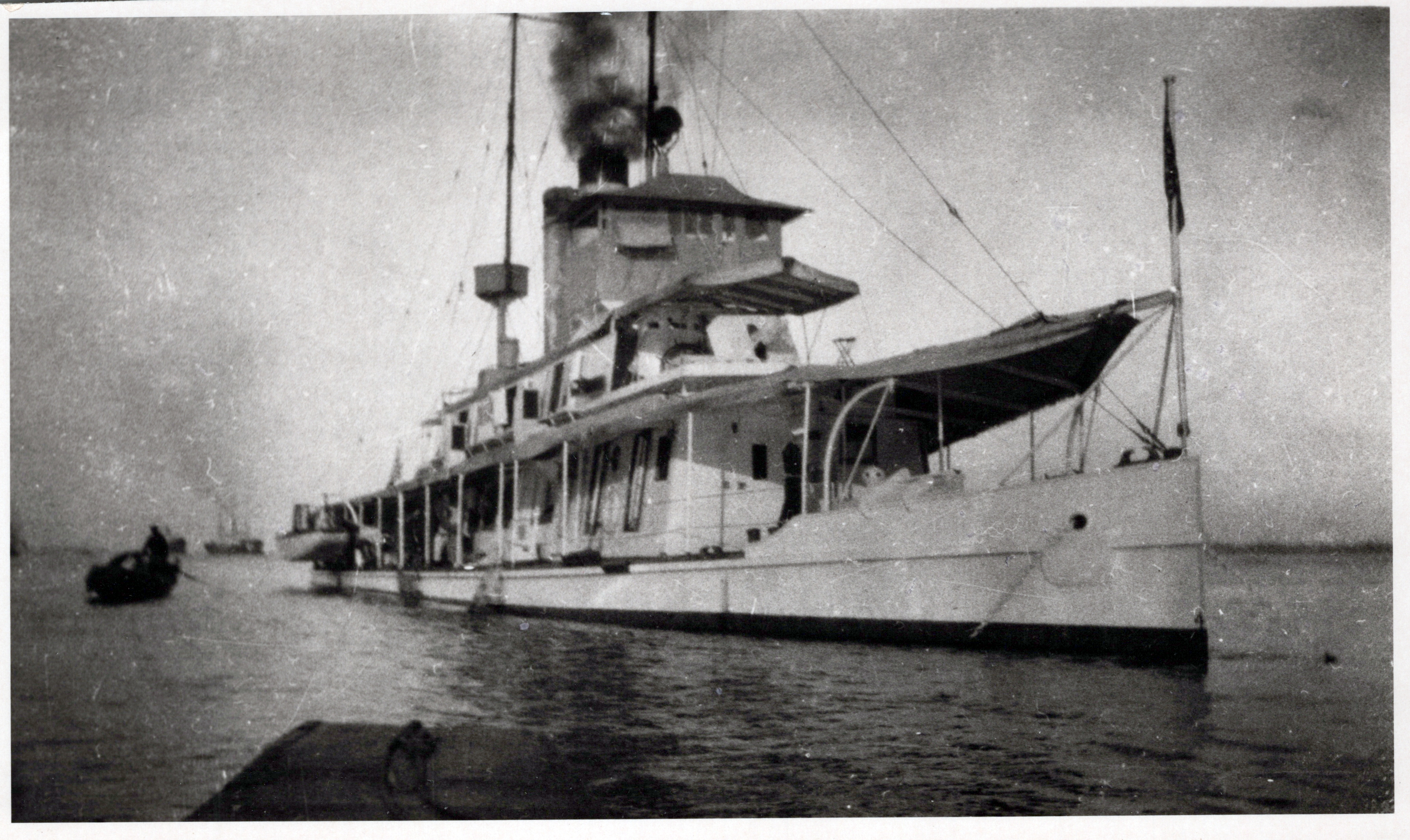

History

United States
- Name: USS Palos
- Builder: Shanghai Dock and Engineering Co.
- Laid down: 28 April 1913
- Launched: 23 April 1914
- Commissioned: 24 June 1914
- Decommissioned: 21 May 1937
- Reclassified: PR-1, 15 June 1928
- Stricken: 21 May 1937
- Fate: Sold, 3 June 1937

General characteristics
- Type: River gunboat
- Displacement: 204 long tons (207 t)
- Length: 165 ft 6 in (50.44 m)
- Beam: 24 ft 6 in (7.47 m)
- Draft: 2 ft 5 in (0.74 m)
- Speed: 13.25 knots (24.54 km/h; 15.25 mph)
- Complement: 52 officers and enlisted
- Armament: 2 × 6-pounder guns; 6 × machine guns

The second USS Palos (PG-16), a shallow draft gunboat built for service on the Yangtze River, China, was pre-constructed at Mare Island Navy Yard in 1912; dismantled and shipped to Shanghai, China: laid down by the Shanghai Dock and Engineering Co., on 28 April 1913; launched on 23 April 1914; sponsored by Mrs. Lee S. Border, wife of Naval Constructor Border who supervised the gunboat's construction; and commissioned on 24 June 1914.

== Service history ==
=== 1914–1917 ===
One of two light draft warships designed for service on the Upper Yangtze River over 900 miles (1,400 km) inland, Palos departed Shanghai on 29 June to begin patrolling. Steaming upriver through steep gorges and swift rapids, the gunboat became the first U.S. warship to reach Chongqing, 1,300 miles (2,100 km) from the sea, on 28 August. Remaining at that port until 23 September, she then joined her sister-ship USS Monocacy in protecting American lives and property on the upper reaches of the Yangtze. Except for a brief period from 6 April to 14 August 1917 when she was interned at Shanghai before an international agreement allowed Allied warships to continue patrols, Palos spent her entire career as part of the Yangtze Patrol.

=== 1917–1929 ===
During the course of her service, the gunboat protected American interests in China down the entire length of the Yangtze, at times convoying U.S. and foreign vessels on the river, evacuating American citizens during periods of disturbance and in general giving credible presence to U.S. consulates and residences in various Chinese cities. In the period of great unrest in central China in the 1920s, Palos was especially busy patrolling the upper Yangtze against bands of warlord soldiers and outlaws. The warship engaged in continuous patrol operations between Yichang and Chongqing throughout 1923, supplying armed guards to merchant ships, and protecting Americans at Chongqing while that city was under siege by a warlord army. As the Nationalist Revolution progressed in the Middle Yangtze Valley, Palos stood down river and operated about Hankou and Jiujiang through 1927. She was reclassified PR-1 on 15 June 1928, and continued her river patrol operations until being placed in reserve in June 1929 when six new river gunboats joined the Yangtze Patrol.

=== 1929–1937 ===
Basing out of Shanghai, Palos cruised the lower Yangtze and its tributaries, making less frequent patrols to the upper river except when unrest required additional naval presence.

The gunboat was still active, however, despite her reserve status, In the summer of 1930, the warship proceeded to Changsha, a treaty port on Lake Dongting below Hankou and provided protection for American, British, and German nationals from guerilla activity, receiving official thanks from the German government for her work. She was placed in full commission on 5 September 1931 in response to the need for additional gunboats to supplement the Yangtze Patrol in relief work for the disastrous summer floods, the worst in the Yangtzes history, which inundated 34,000 square miles (88,000 km^{2}) of land and left millions homeless.

Palos continued Yangtze Patrol operations until October 1934 and then departed Shanghai for Chongqing to take up duty there as permanent station ship. After a long and difficult voyage through the rapids, the gunboat docked at the Chungking Navy Club on 12 November and remained there until decommissioned and struck from the Navy List on 21 May 1937. She was subsequently sold to the Ming Sung Industrial Co. on 3 June and scrapped.
