= USS General Alava =

Cargo ship of the United States Navy

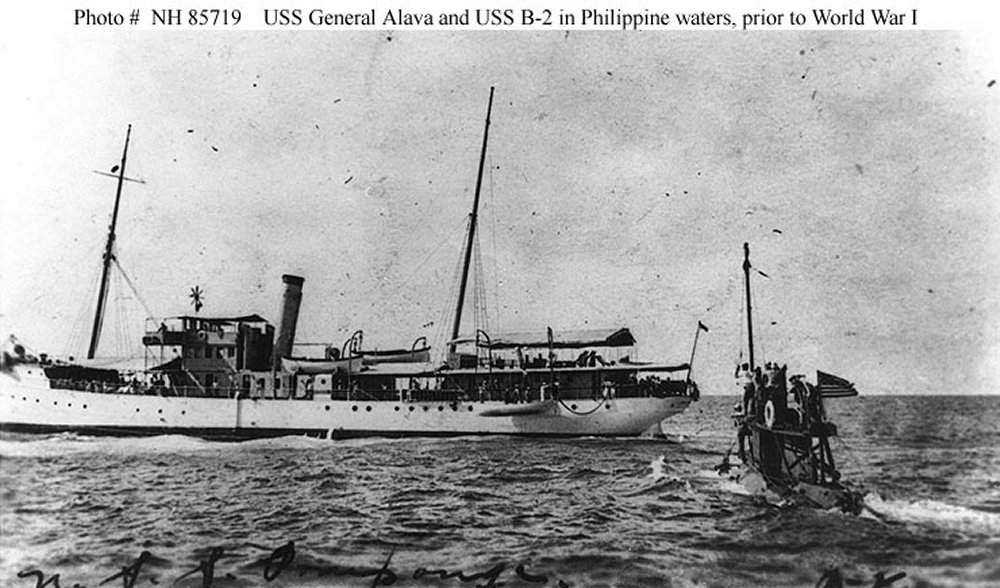

History
- Name: General Alava
- Namesake: Miguel Ricardo de Álava
- Owner: 1895: (Spain) Spanish Government; 1900: (United States) US Department of War
- Operator: 1900: United States Navy
- Builder: A McMillan & Son, Dumbarton
- Yard number: 334
- Launched: 8 May 1895
- Commissioned: by US Navy, 9 March 1900
- Decommissioned: 28 June 1929
- Identification: from 1920: US Navy pennant number AG-5
- Captured: by US forces, 21 February 1900
- Fate: Sunk as a target ship, 17 July 1929

General characteristics
- Type: cargo ship
- Tonnage: as built: 794 GRT, 476 NRT
- Length: 212.0 ft (64.6 m)
- Beam: 30.0 ft (9.1 m)
- Draft: 13 ft (4.0 m)
- Depth: 17.8 ft (5.4 m)
- Installed power: 118 NHP
- Propulsion: triple-expansion engine
- Speed: 10 1/2 kn (19.4 km/h)
- Complement: in US Navy service: 76
- Armament: in US Navy service: 1 × 6-pounder gun; 2 × 3-pounder guns

USS General Alava (AG-5) was a cargo steamship that was built in Scotland in 1895 and sunk in the Pacific Ocean in 1929. She was built for the Spanish Government; however, in 1900 United States forces captured her in the Spanish–American War. She spent most of her career in the United States Navy.

== Building ==
Archibald McMillan & Son built General Alava at Dumbarton, Scotland, launching her on 8 May 1895. She was named after Miguel Ricardo de Álava, who had been a brigadier general in the Spanish Army in the Napoleonic Wars and in 1835 briefly served as Prime Minister of Spain.

The ship's registered length was 212.0 ft (64.6 m), her beam was 30.0 ft (9.1 m) and her depth was 17.8 ft (5.4 m). Her tonnages were 794 GRT and 476 NRT. She had a single screw, driven by a three-cylinder triple-expansion engine built by David Rowan & Son of Glasgow. It was rated at 118 NHP and gave her a speed of 10 1/2 kn (19.4 km/h).

== Capture and initial US service ==
US forces captured General Alava in the Spanish–American War. She was transferred from the War Department to the Navy on 21 February 1900, and commissioned at Cavite, Philippines on 9 March 1900. In US Navy service her tonnage was revised to 1,390 GRT.

She served in the Philippines as a transport ship and lighthouse tender. She carried US Marines between various garrisons in the Philippines, making a voyage to Guam in November 1900 to return survivors of Yosemite — lost at sea in a typhoon — to Cavite. After a tour of the Archipelago with the Army Board for selection of a leper colony site, she carried a Naval Observatory party to Pendang, Sumatra, to observe a partial eclipse of the Sun on 16 May 1901. From 3 to 26 September 1901 she cruised with Rear Admiral C.C. Remey on inspection of the southern islands. She carried Governor William Howard Taft from Manila to Singapore and back from 5 to 22 August 1902. She again sailed from Manila on 29 October, transporting a Forestry Commission to the southern islands, Northern Luzon, Formosa and Nagasaki, Japan. She returned to Subic Bay on 30 December and was decommissioned at Cavite on 24 January 1903.

== Recommissioning ==
General Alava was recommissioned on 11 June 1904 for transport service between the islands until May 1905, when she left for the coast of China. She returned to Cavite from Shanghai on 21 November and decommissioned on 26 February 1906.

General Alava recommissioned on 18 December. She was mainly used to carry passengers between Cavite and Olongapo until February 1925. This service was interrupted from May to November 1919 by a cruise to Batavia, Saigon, and Celebes to show the flag. With the assignment of hull classification and numbers to ships in 1920, she was designated a miscellaneous auxiliary "(AG-5)". The transport departed Manila on 18 February 1925 once again to show the flag at Batavia and Saigon and to proceed via Hong Kong to Shanghai, arriving on 24 April.

== China service ==
For the next two years, General Alava carried passengers between Chinese ports, twice returning to the Philippines for brief visits. In several inspection cruises from Shanghai, she carried the US Asiatic Fleet Commander to such ports as Dalian, Yantai, Qingdao, Tianjin, and Qinhuangdao. On 24 August 1927, she became receiving ship at Shanghai for transient officers of the Yangtze Patrol and from time to time made inspection trips along the river.

== Decommissioning ==
General Alava returned from her last cruise on the river to Nanjing on 3 June 1929 and decommissioned at Shanghai on 28 June. She was used as a target during gunnery practice off the Asiatic coast and sunk on 17 July 1929.
