= USS Monocacy incident =

1918 maritime incident

Coordinates: 40.363°N 117.432°E

- Part of the Yangtze Patrol
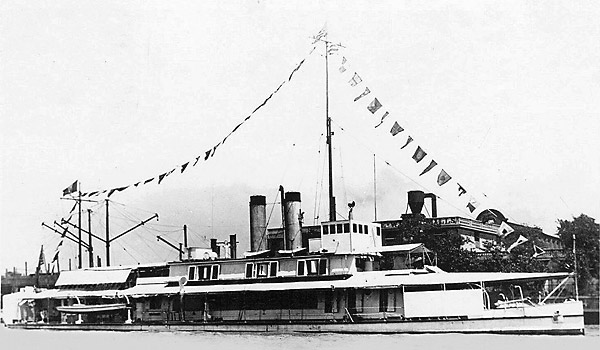
- USS Monocacy in 1928.
Date	17 January 1918
Location	near Chenglin, Yangtze River, China
Result	United States victory

Belligerents
United States	China

Commanders and leaders
Harvey Delano	unknown

Strength
1 gunboat	~200 infantry

Casualties and losses
1 killed 2 wounded 1 gunboat damaged	Unknown
- One Japanese merchant ship was fired on during the action.

The USS Monocacy incident was an attack on the American gunboat Monocacy in January 1918 by Chinese soldiers along the Yangtze River. It was one of many incidents at the time involving armed Chinese firing on foreign vessels.

== Background ==
At the beginning of World War I, the European nations with flotillas on the Yangtze withdrew their vessels to reinforce their fleets in Europe. This left the Yangtze Patrol with the only Western naval presence on the river. China was initially a neutral country during the war, as was the United States. But when the American government declared war on Germany in April 1917, a now belligerent flotilla of American ships occupied the neutral Chinese waters. As a result, the Yangtze Patrol was interned at Shanghai. The attack on Monocacy occurred in January 1918, just after the Yangtze Patrol was released from internment upon China's declaration of war on Germany. Though America and China were allies, skirmishes between armed Chinese and foreigners became more and more common and would continue long after World War I. Lieutenant Harvey Delano of Monocacy received news that Chinese soldiers had fired on several foreign vessels in the area so in response, bags of coal were piled on deck to provide cover for the sailors on patrol.

== Incident ==
While steaming through the river roughly 50 miles (80 km) north of Chenglin at exactly 09:00 on 17 January, the 200 long ton (200 tonne) Monocacy was fired on from both sides of the river by Chinese troops ashore. Delano quickly ordered his men to alter course and raise the largest American flag aboard. The first shot struck the jackstaff and was followed by a volley from an estimated 200 rifles. Two shots hit the bridge, so at 09:01 the Americans returned fire with small arms. Chinese forces were spread out for 2 miles (3.2 km) along the river and their shots increased as the Americans continued on, but by 09:05 most of the rifles were silent, except for some sporadic sniping. Chief Yeoman Howard LeRoy O'Brien was hit by one of these sporadic shots and fell to the deck dead. Because of this, the skipper ordered his men to return fire with the battery of 6-pounders at 09:25, and five minutes later all was quiet. After shooting only six or seven shells and about 3,000 bullets, the attackers retreated. Monocacy was hit about eighty times and two American sailors were wounded by Chinese fire, one of them seriously. During the engagement, a Japanese steamer was heading downriver and was fired on, but the Americans prevented her from being damaged by providing covering fire. The incidents of Chinese troops firing on foreign vessels were quickly brought to the attention of the western population of China. Protests broke out in Shanghai, which ultimately forced the Chinese government to make an apology and pay $25,000 to the United States. The money was eventually given to the wife of Chief Yeoman O'Brien and the affair was settled. Both of the wounded sailors received $500.

== See also ==
- General Sherman incident
- Gunboat diplomacy
