= Ulgan =

- Location within Azerbaijan Location within Shaki-Zagatala Economic Region
- Coordinates: 41°40′10″N 46°12′52″E
- Country: Azerbaijan
- Rayon: Balakan
- Time zone: UTC+4 (AZT)
  - Summer (DST): UTC+5 (AZT)

Ulgan is a village in the Balakan Rayon of Azerbaijan.
