= Yangtze Patrol =

Naval operation to protect Americans' interests in China, 1854–1949

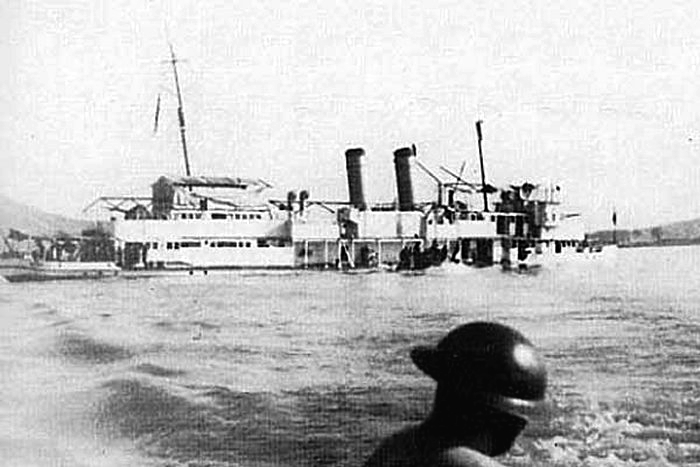
- USS Panay, a United States Navy river gunboat, of the "Yangtze Patrol" commissioned in 1928, as she sinks on the Yangtze River near Nanking, China in December 1937, after being attacked by Japanese aircraft
- Planned by: United States
- Objective: protect U.S. interests and citizens in Yangtze River treaty ports in Qing Empire from Chinese insurgents and river pirates
- Date: 1854–1949
- Executed by: United States Navy
- Outcome: avoided internal Chinese conflicts in mid-19th to mid-20th century, except for World War II

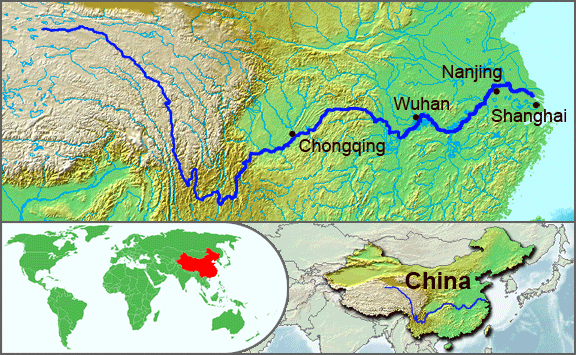
The Yangtze River of China

The Yangtze Patrol, also known as the Yangtze River Patrol Force, Yangtze River Patrol, YangPat, and ComYangPat, was a prolonged naval operation initiated after the Battle of Muddy Flat, from 1854 to 1949 to protect American interests in the Yangtze River's treaty ports. The Yangtze Patrol also patrolled the coastal waters of China where they protected U.S. citizens, their property, and Christian missionaries.

The Yangtze River is the longest in China, and it plays an important commercial role, with ocean-bound vessels proceeding as far upstream as the city of Wuhan. This squadron-sized unit cruised the waters of the Yangtze from Shanghai on the Pacific Ocean into the far interior of China at Chongqing.

Initially, the Yangtze Patrol was formed from ships of the United States Navy and assigned to the East India Squadron. In 1868, patrol duties were carried out by the Asiatic Squadron of the United States Navy. Under the unequal treaties, the United States, Japan, and various European powers, especially the United Kingdom, which had been on the Yangtze since 1897, were allowed to cruise China's rivers.

In 1902, the United States Asiatic Fleet took control of the operations of the Yangtze Patrol.

In 1922, the Yangtze Patrol was established as a formal component of the United States Navy in China.

In 1942, when the United States entered World War II, the Yangtze Patrol effectively ceased operations in China because of the limited resources of the United States Navy, which needed the patrol crews and their ships elsewhere in fighting with Japanese forces throughout the Pacific.

Following the end of World War II, the Yangtze Patrol resumed its duties in 1945, but on a more limited basis with fewer ships during the Chinese Civil War. When the Chinese Communist forces eventually occupied the Yangtze River valley in 1949, the United States Navy permanently ceased operations and disbanded the Yangtze Patrol.

== Operations (1854–1949) ==
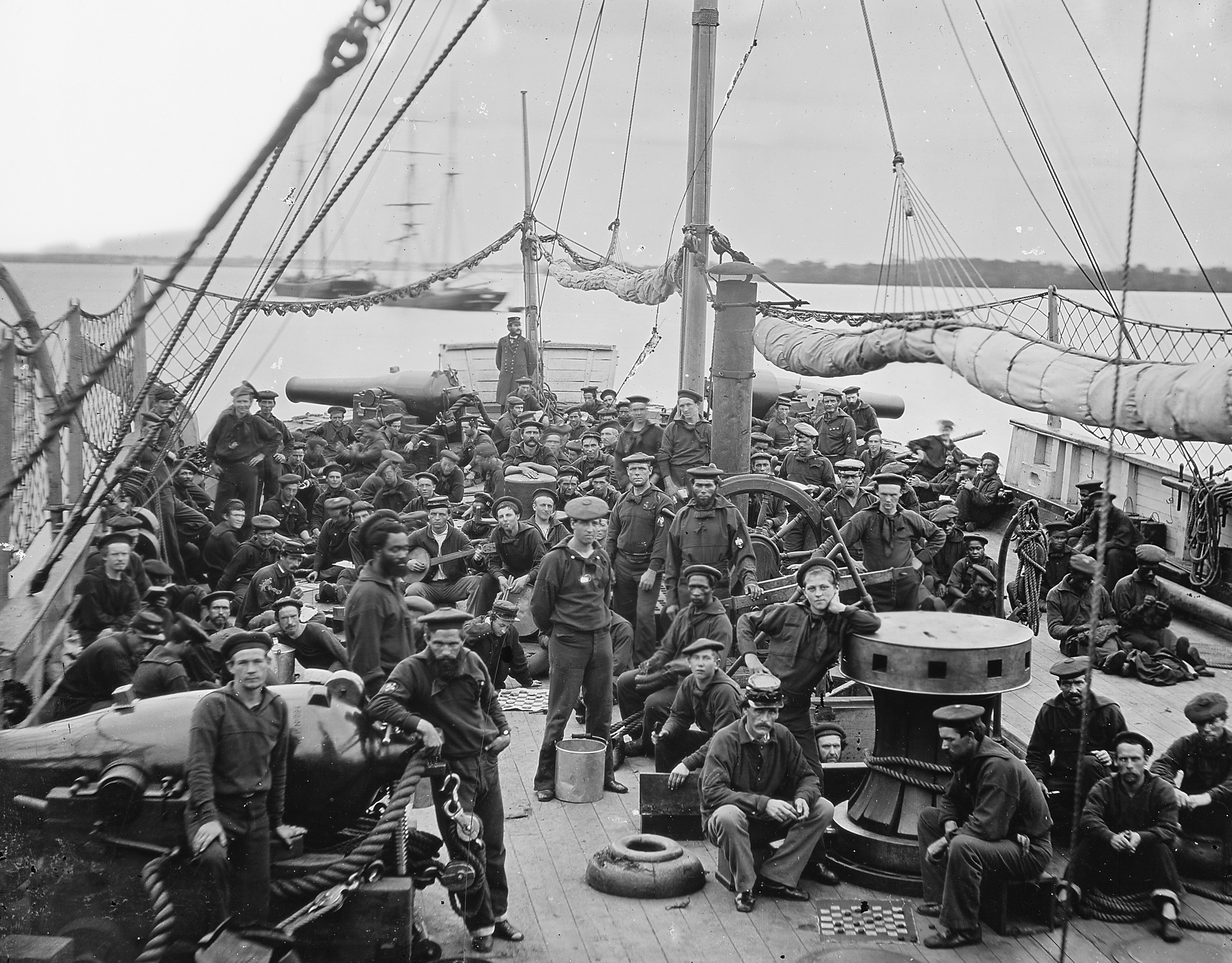
U.S. Navy sailors on board the river gunboat USS Mendota, during the American Civil War - ca. 1864

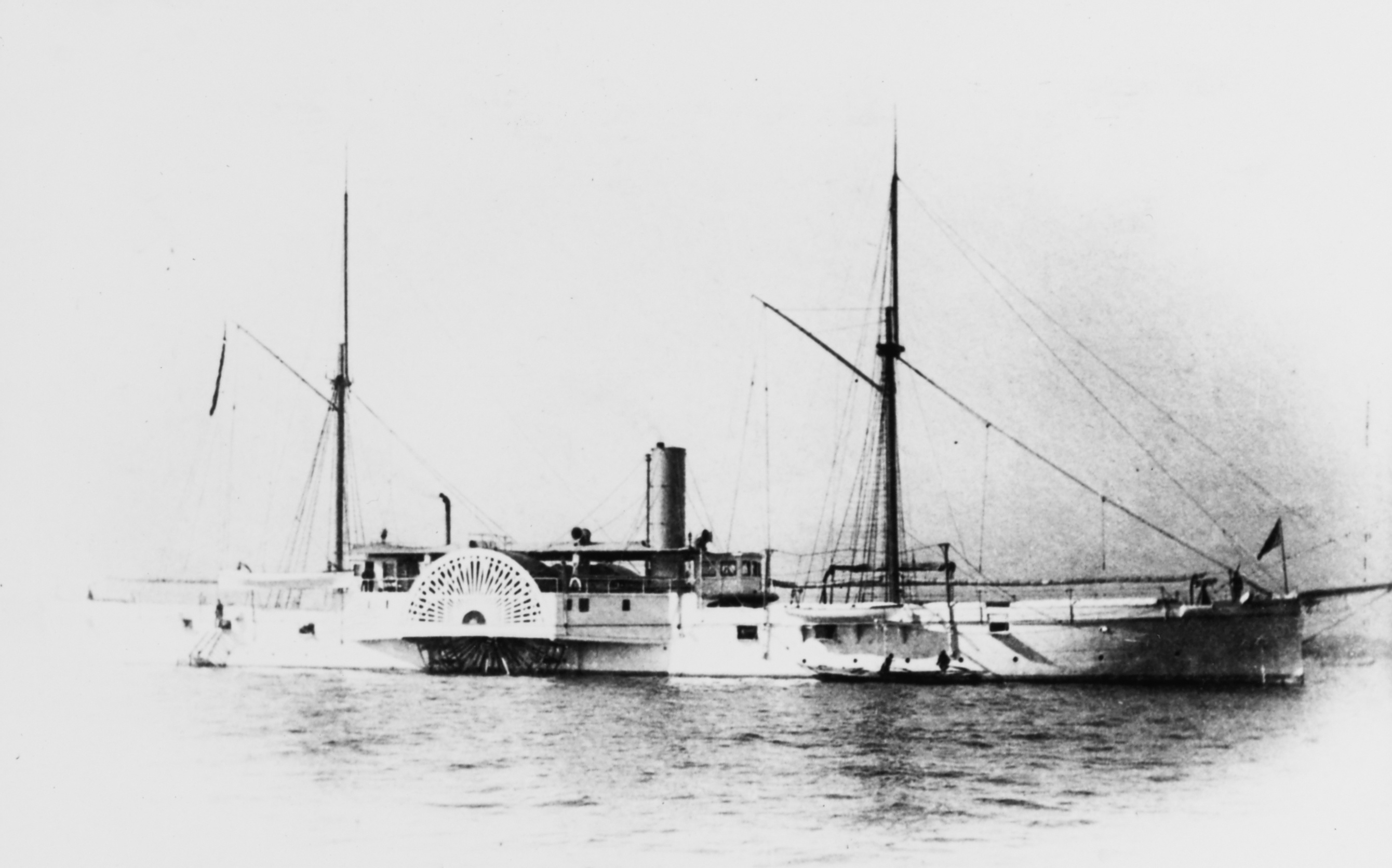
USS Ashuelot, a steam-powered, U.S. Navy river gunboat, on the Yangtze Patrol, in service, for one year, in 1874, to protect American interests, in Shanghai, China, and as an exploring expedition, along the upper Yangtze River, photograph, circa 1874

=== 19th century ===
==== 1854–1860 ====
As a result of treaties imposed on China by foreign powers after the First (1839–1842) and Second Opium Wars (1856–1860), China was opened to foreign trade at a number of locations known as "treaty ports" where foreigners were permitted to live and conduct business. Also, created by the treaties was the doctrine of extraterritoriality, a system whereby citizens of foreign countries living in China were subject to the laws of their home country. Most favoured nation treatment under the treaties assured other countries of the fact that the same privileges would be afforded to them as well, and soon many nations, including the United States, operated merchant ships and navy gunboats on the waterways of China.

==== 1860–1900 ====
During the 1860s and 1870s, American merchant ships were prominent on the lower Yangtze River, operating up to the deepwater port of Hankou 680 mi (1,090 km) inland. The added mission of anti-piracy patrols required U.S. naval and marine landing parties to be put ashore several times to protect American interests. In 1874, the U.S. gunboat, USS Ashuelot, reached as far as Yichang, at the foot of the Yangtze gorges, 975 miles (1,569 km) from the sea. During this period, most US personnel found a tour in the Yangtze to be uneventful, as a major American shipping company had sold its interests to a Chinese firm, leaving the patrol with little to protect. However, as the stability of China began to deteriorate after 1890, the U.S. naval presence began to increase along the Yangtze.

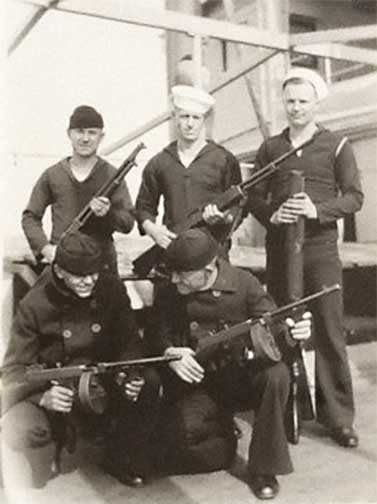
Yangtze Patrol sailors on the river gunboat USS Luzon in 1932, armed with a Winchester Model 1897 shotgun, Model 1928 Thompson submachine guns with L drum magazines, a Model 1918 Browning automatic rifle, and a Model 1917 Lewis Mark IV machine gun

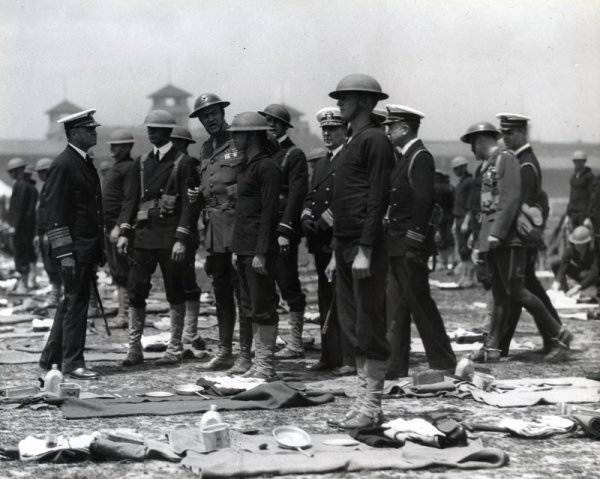
Admiral Mark. L. Bristol (left), Commander of the Asiatic Fleet and Rear Admiral Yates Stirling Jr., Commander of the Yangtze Patrol (center) along with a U.S. Marine Corps colonel and other officers, conducting an inspection of the fleet landing force in 1928 at the racetrack in Shanghai, at the mouth of the Yangtze River. Note the standard-issue, dishpan, Brodie helmets, worn by the navy personnel, which were used by the U.S. military from 1917 to 1942.

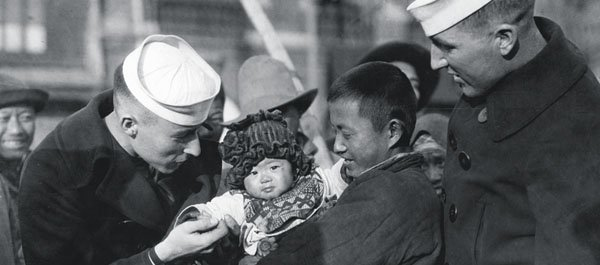
Sailors of the Yangtze Patrol, in 1930, with local Chinese citizens in Shanghai, which was a most desirable U.S. Navy duty station

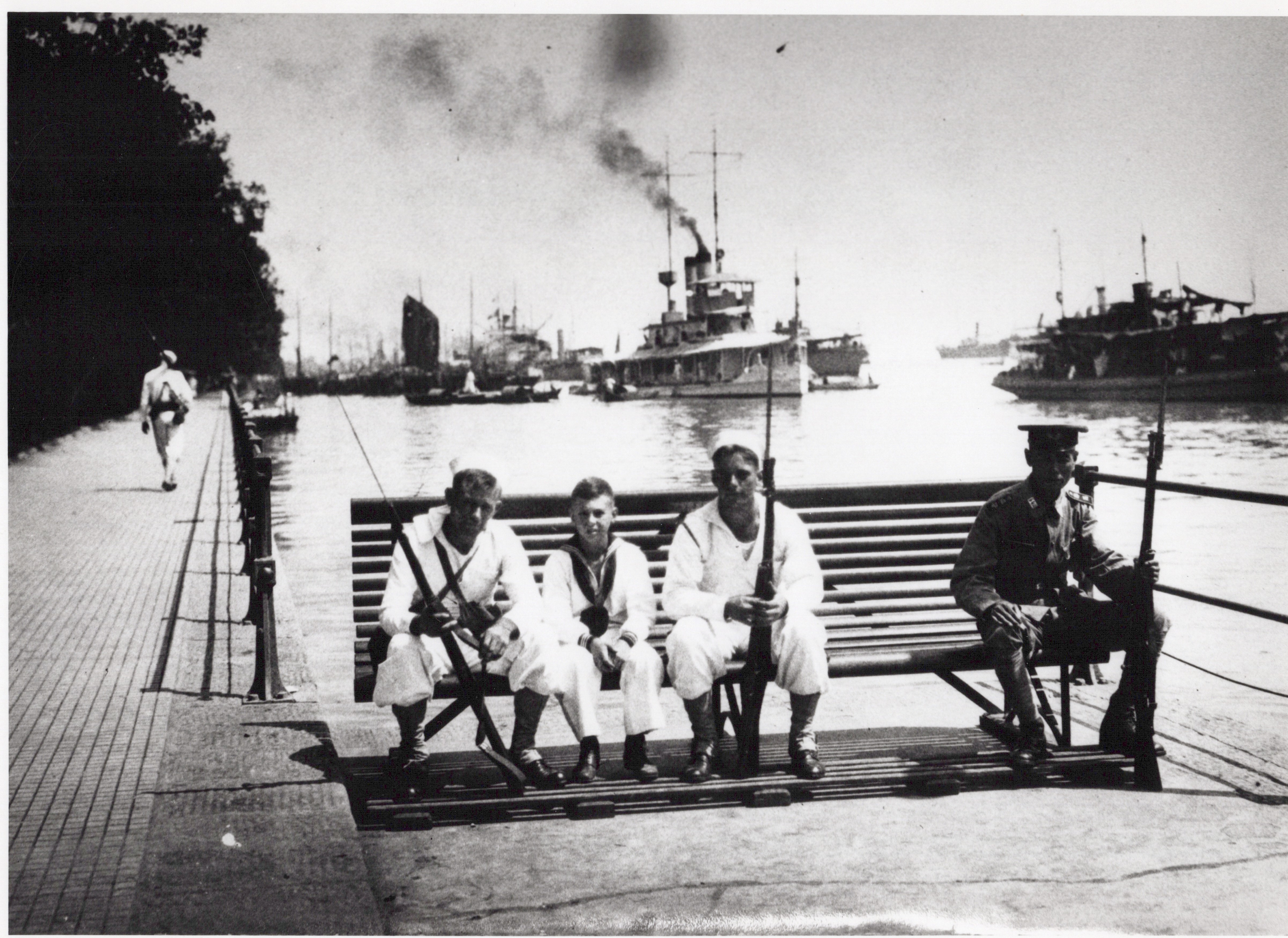
1926 Hankow, USS Palos

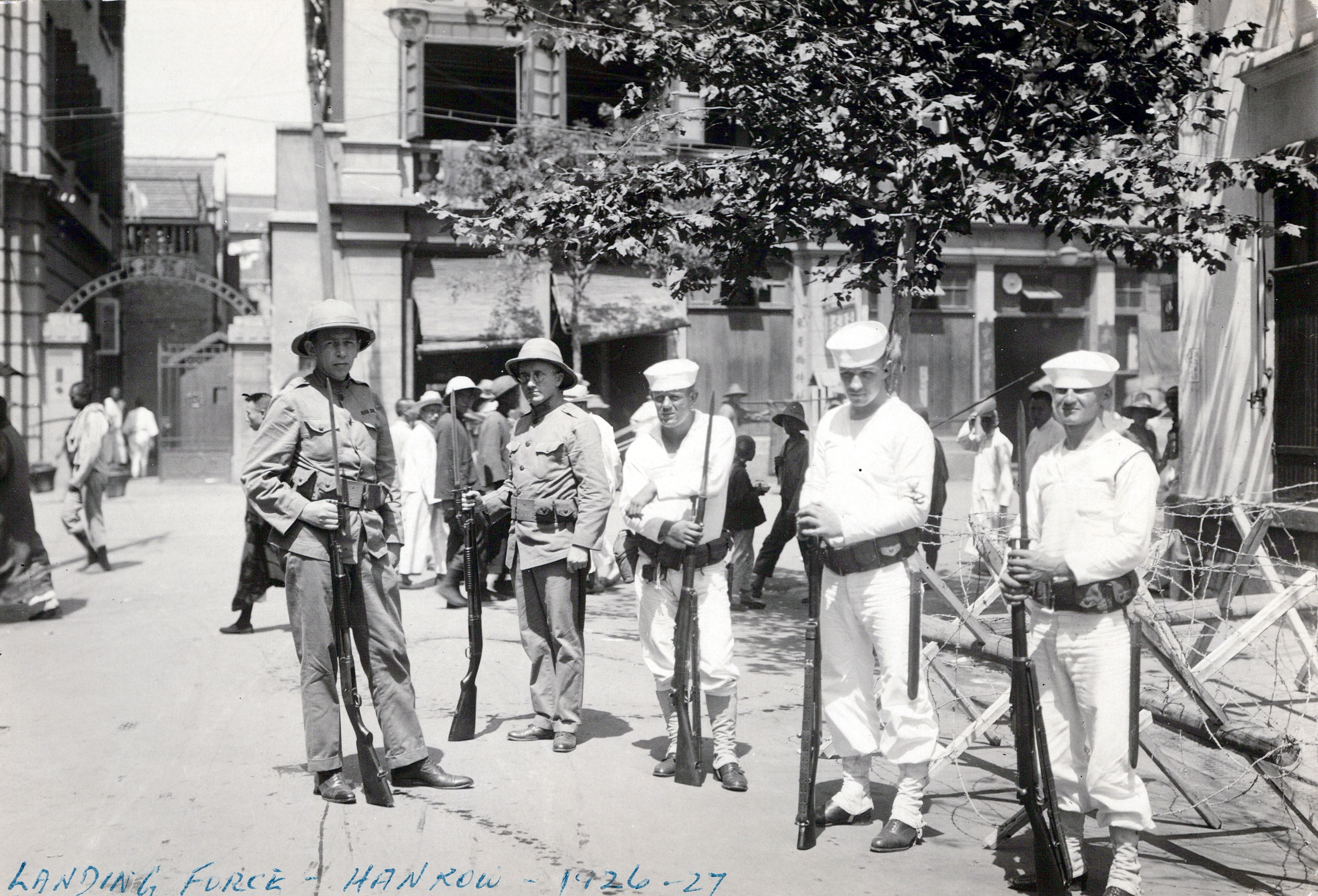
1927 Hankow, USS Palos landing party

=== 20th century ===
==== 1900–1920 ====
In 1901, American-flagged merchant vessels returned to the Yangtze when Standard Oil Company placed a steam-powered tanker in service on the lower river. Within the decade, several small motorships began hauling kerosene, the principal petroleum product used in China by that company. At the same time, the United States Navy acquired four Spanish vessels (the gunboats USS Elcano, Quiros, Villalobos, and Callao), which it had seized in the Philippines during the Spanish–American War. These vessels became the core of the Yangtze River patrol for the first dozen years of the 20th century, but they lacked the power to go beyond Yichang onto the more difficult stretches of the river.

USS Palos and Monocacy were the first American gunboats built specifically for service on the Yangtze River. The Mare Island Naval Shipyard in Vallejo, California built them in 1913. The U.S. Navy then had them disassembled and shipped to China aboard the American steamer Mongolia. The Jiangnan Shipyard in Shanghai reassembled them and put them into service in 1914.

Later in 1914, both vessels demonstrated their ability to handle the rapids of the upper river when they reached Chongqing, which was more than 1,300 mi (2,100 km) from the sea, and then went further to Jiading on the Min River. In 1917, the U.S. entered World War I. The U.S. rendered the guns of Palos and Monocacy inoperable to protect Chinese neutrality. After China entered the war on the side of the Allies, the U.S. Navy reactivated the guns.

In 1917, the first Standard Oil tanker reached Chongqing, and a pattern of American commerce on the river began to emerge. On 17 January 1918, armed Chinese men attacked Monocacy and she was forced to return fire with her 6-pounder gun. Passenger and cargo service by American-flag ships began in 1920 with the Robert Dollar Line and the American West China Company. They were followed in 1923 by the Yangtze River Steamship Company, which stayed on the river until 1935, long after the other American passenger-cargo ships were gone.

==== 1920–1930 ====
In the early 1920s, the patrol found itself fighting the forces of warlords and bandits. To accommodate its increased responsibilities on the river, the United States Navy constructed six new gunboats in Shanghai during 1926–1927 and commissioned them in late 1927–1928 during the command of Rear Admiral Yates Stirling Jr. to replace four craft, originally seized from Spain during the Spanish–American War, that had been patrolling since 1903. All were capable of reaching Chongqing at high water, and all year-round. Collectively referred to by the U.S. press as "the new six", USS Luzon and Mindanao were the largest, USS Oahu and Panay next in size, and USS Guam and Tutuila the smallest. These vessels gave the Navy the capability it needed at a time when operational requirements were growing rapidly.

In the late 1920s, Chiang Kai-shek and the Northern Expedition created a volatile military situation for the patrol along the Yangtze.

==== 1930–1942 ====
After the Japanese took control of much of the middle and lower Yangtze in the 1930s, American river gunboats entered a period of inactivity and impotence. During the early 1930s, National Revolutionary Army took control of much of the north bank of the middle river. The climax of hostilities occurred in 1937 with the Rape of Nanking and the sinking of Panay by the Japanese. The USS Panay incident was the first loss of a U.S. Navy vessel in the conflict which would soon become World War II. Just before the Attack on Pearl Harbor, most of the ships on the Yangtze River Patrol were brought out of China, with only the smallest gunboats, Wake (the renamed Guam) and Tutuila remaining behind. Wake, at Shanghai, was subsequently captured by the Japanese. Tutuila, at Chongqing, was turned over to the Chinese. When the other gunboats reached Manila, the Yangtze River Patrol was formally dissolved when, on 5 December 1941, Rear Admiral Glassford sent the message, "COMYANGPAT DISSOLVED". Subsequently, the evacuated ships were all scuttled or captured with their crews and imprisoned by the Japanese, after the fall of Corregidor in mid-1942. Luzon was later salvaged and used by the Japanese. USS Asheville was sunk in battle on 3 March 1942 and Mindanao was scuttled on 2 May; Oahu was sunk in battle 5 May 1942.

During different periods of time, Naval and Marine Corps personnel, who were in the patrol, were eligible for either the Yangtze Service Medal or the China Service Medal.

==== 1945–1949 ====
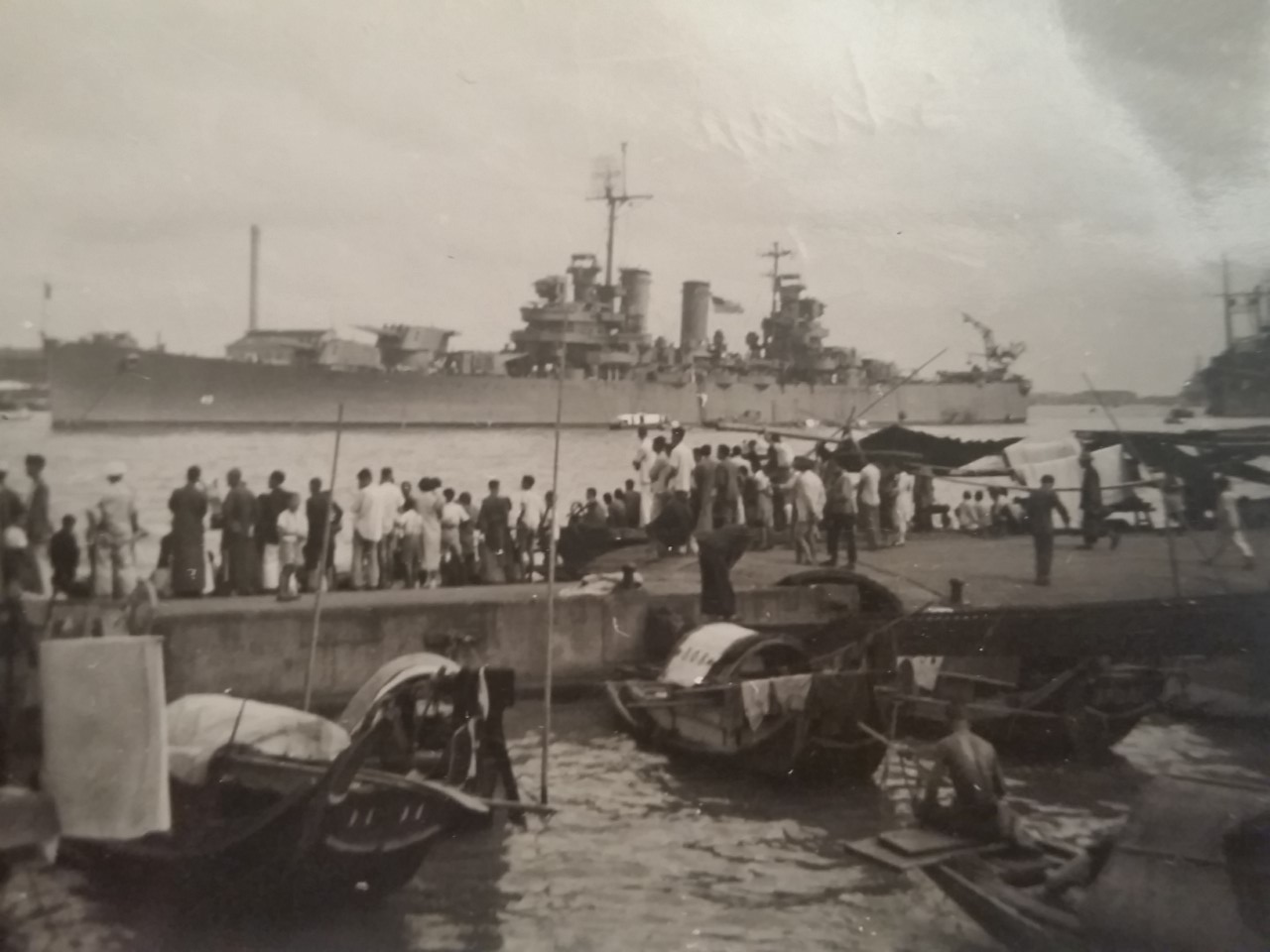
USS Nashville in October 1945 on Yangtze River Patrol in Whangpoo River, Shanghai, China. The ship is viewed from Whang-poo Pier with USS Rocky Mount on the right.

After the surrender of Japan, some patrols on the river were resumed in September 1945. A few days after Japan's surrender, Admiral Thomas C. Kinkaid, commander of the United States 7th Fleet, sailed south aboard USS Rocky Mount to rendezvous with Task Force 73 and continue to Shanghai. However, they were delayed due to a large typhoon and the river being swept for mines. They finally proceeded up the river and arrived in Shanghai on 19 September 1945, with the first Allied ships in over three years. The American flotilla included the command ship (USS Rocky Mount), two light cruisers, four destroyers, twelve destroyer escorts, and many PT boats and minesweepers along with a British naval contingent of three light cruisers, six destroyers, six destroyer escorts, and some minesweepers. In November the new heavy cruiser USS St. Paul joined the unit.

When the Chinese Civil War finally reached the Yangtze Valley in 1949, the U.S. Navy permanently ceased operations on the Yangtze River and officially disbanded the Yangtze Patrol.

== Yangtze River Patrol gunboats ==
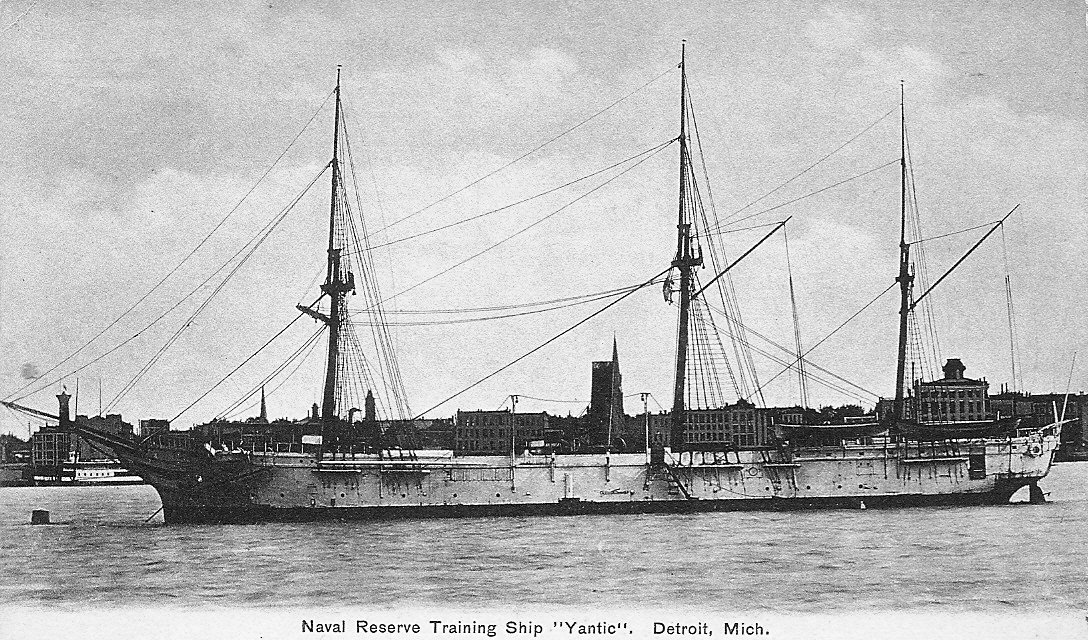
USS Yantic (1874)

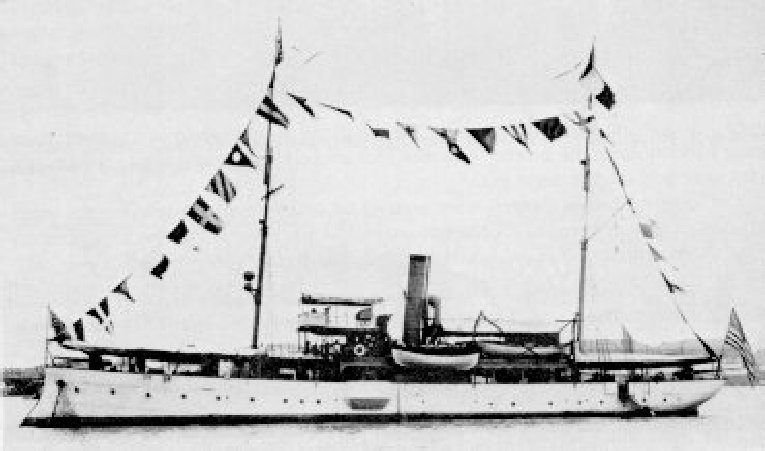
USS Elcano (1902–1928)

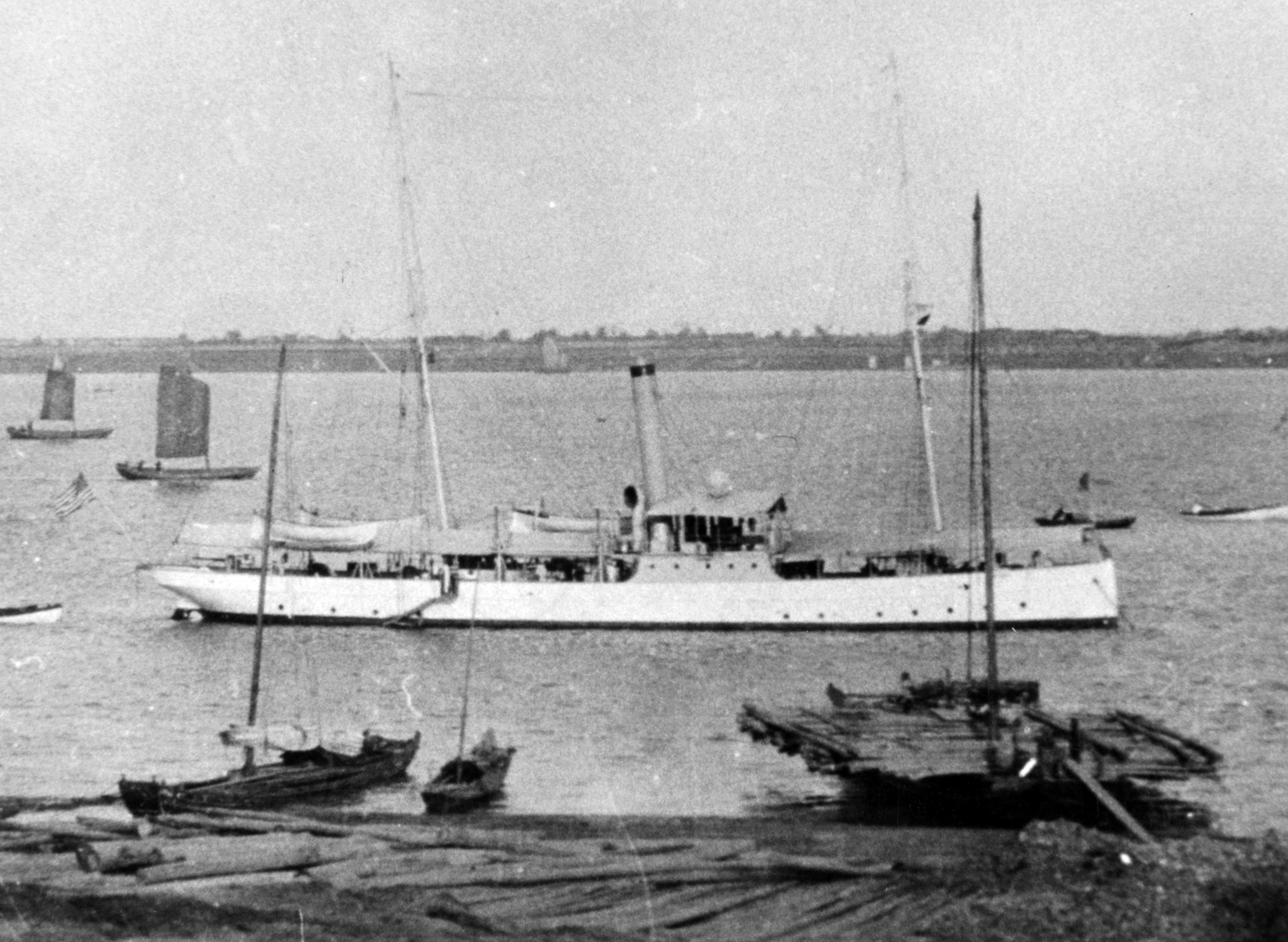
USS Villalobos (1903–1928)

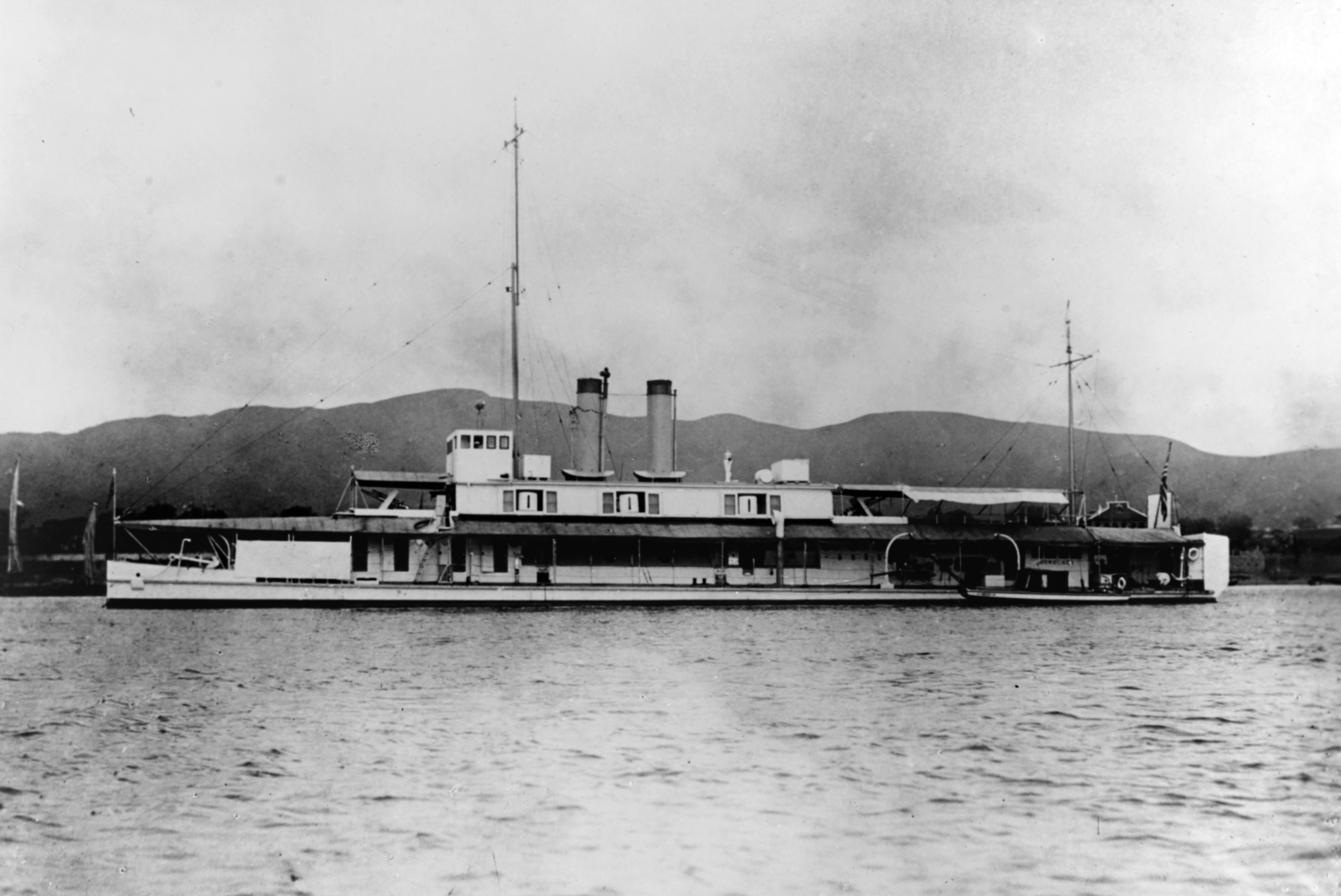
USS Monocacy (1914–1939)

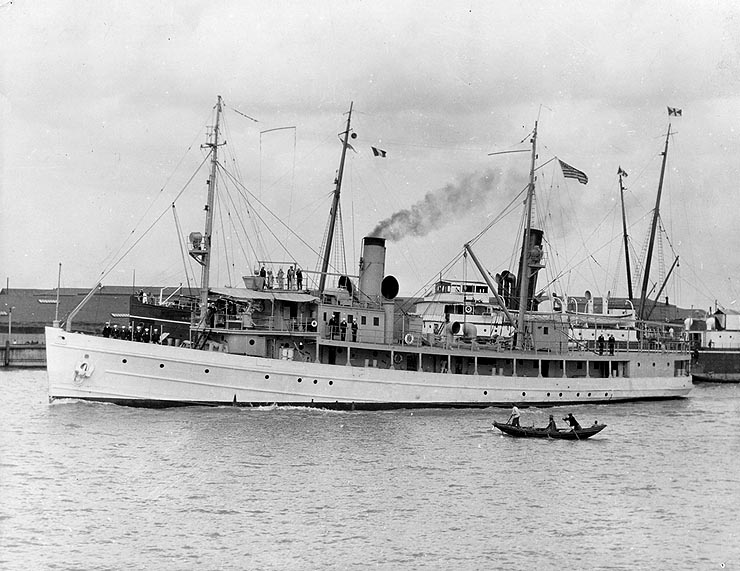
USS Penguin (1923–1941)

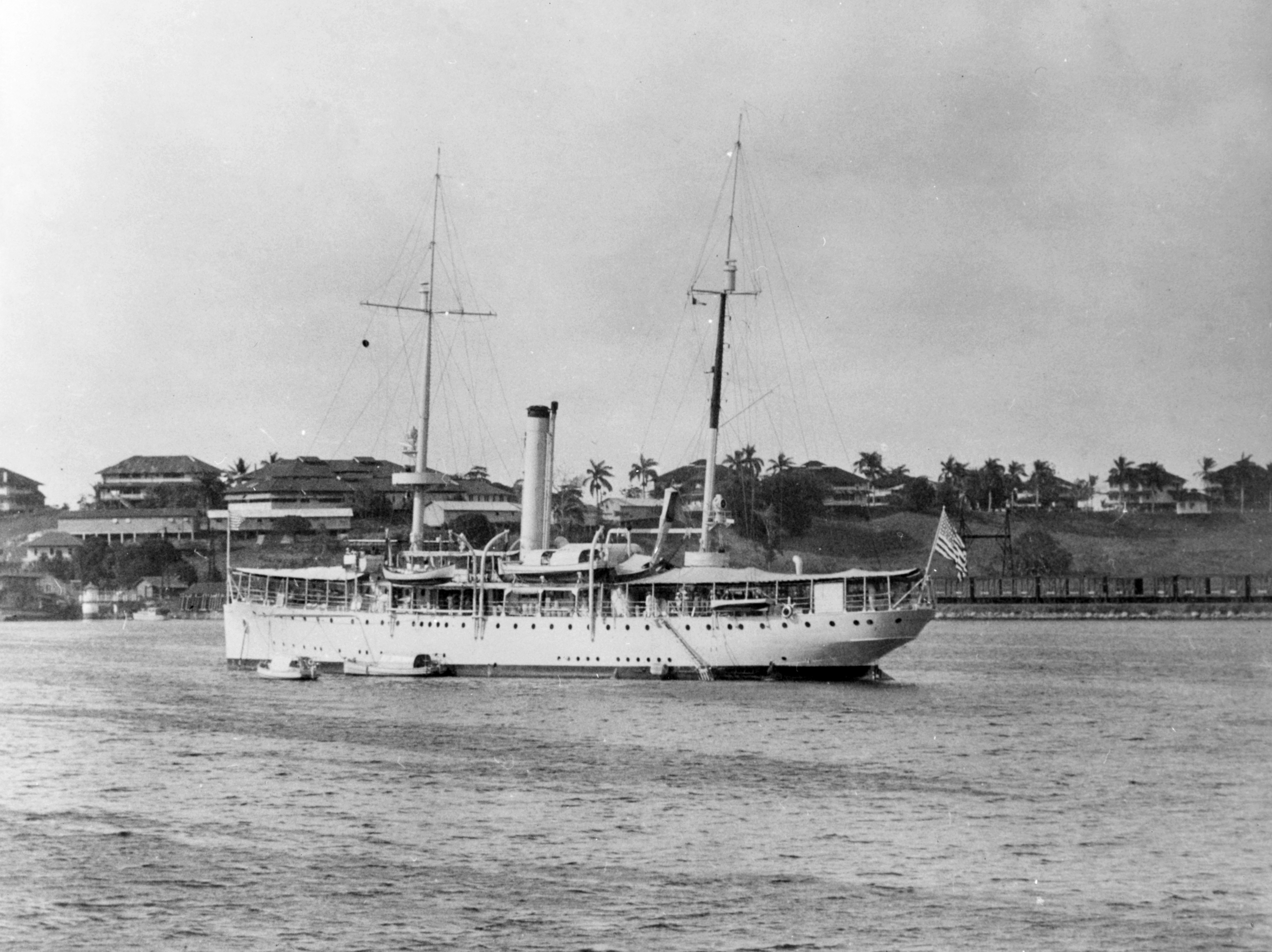
USS Asheville (1926–1927)

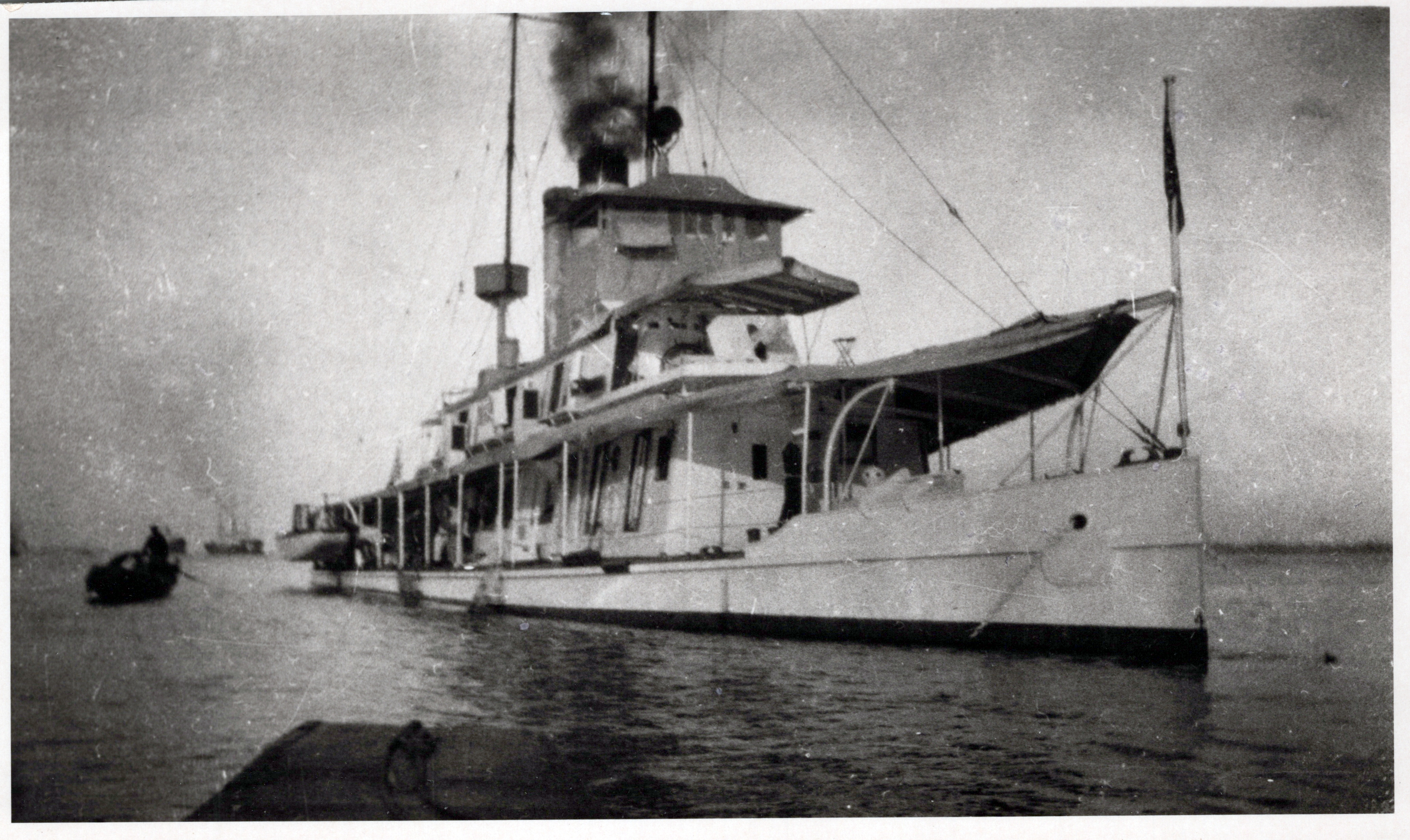
USS Palos (1926)

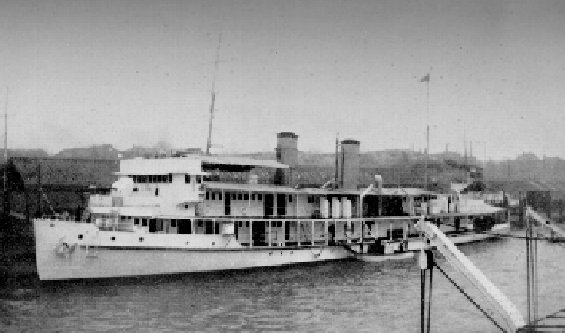
USS Luzon (1927–1942)

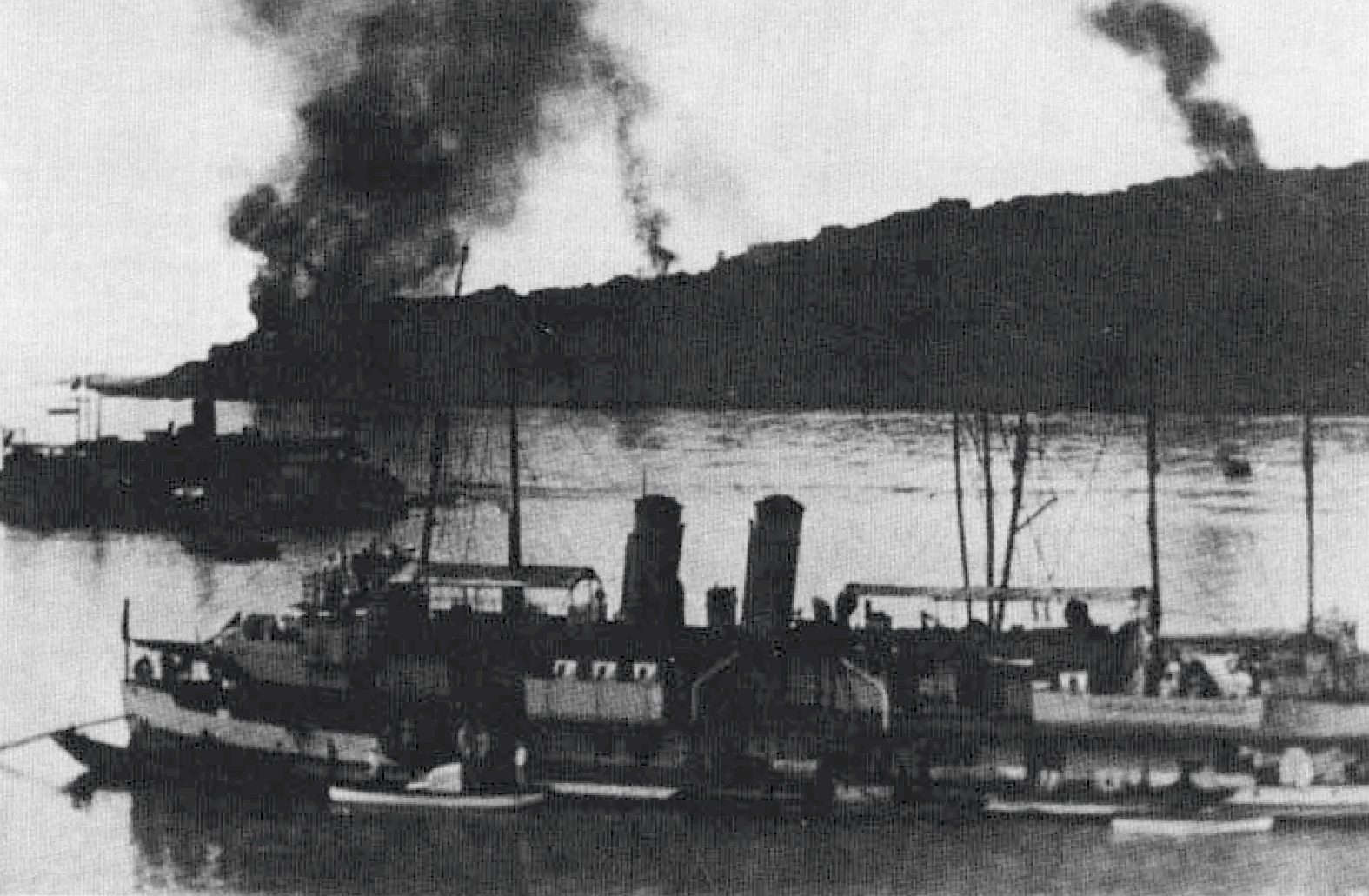
USS Tutuila (1928–1937)

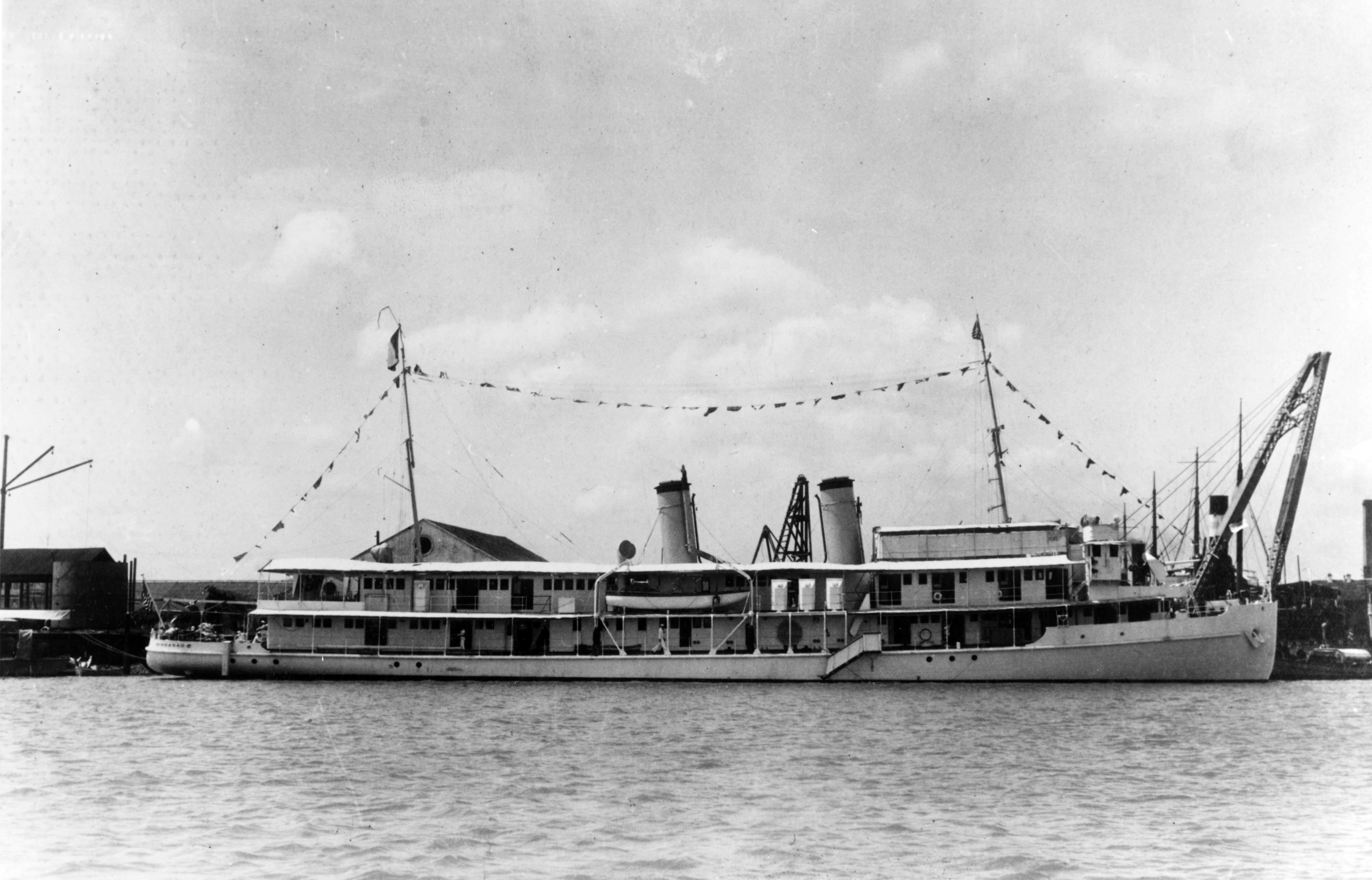
USS Mindanao (1928–1941)

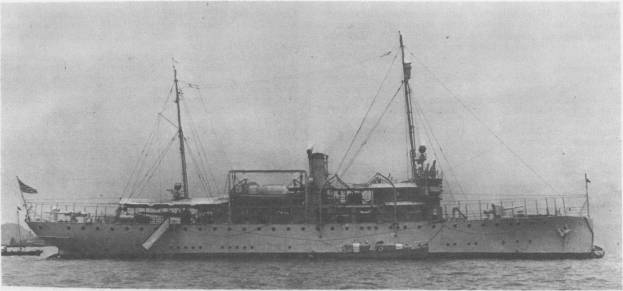
USS Tulsa (1929–1941)

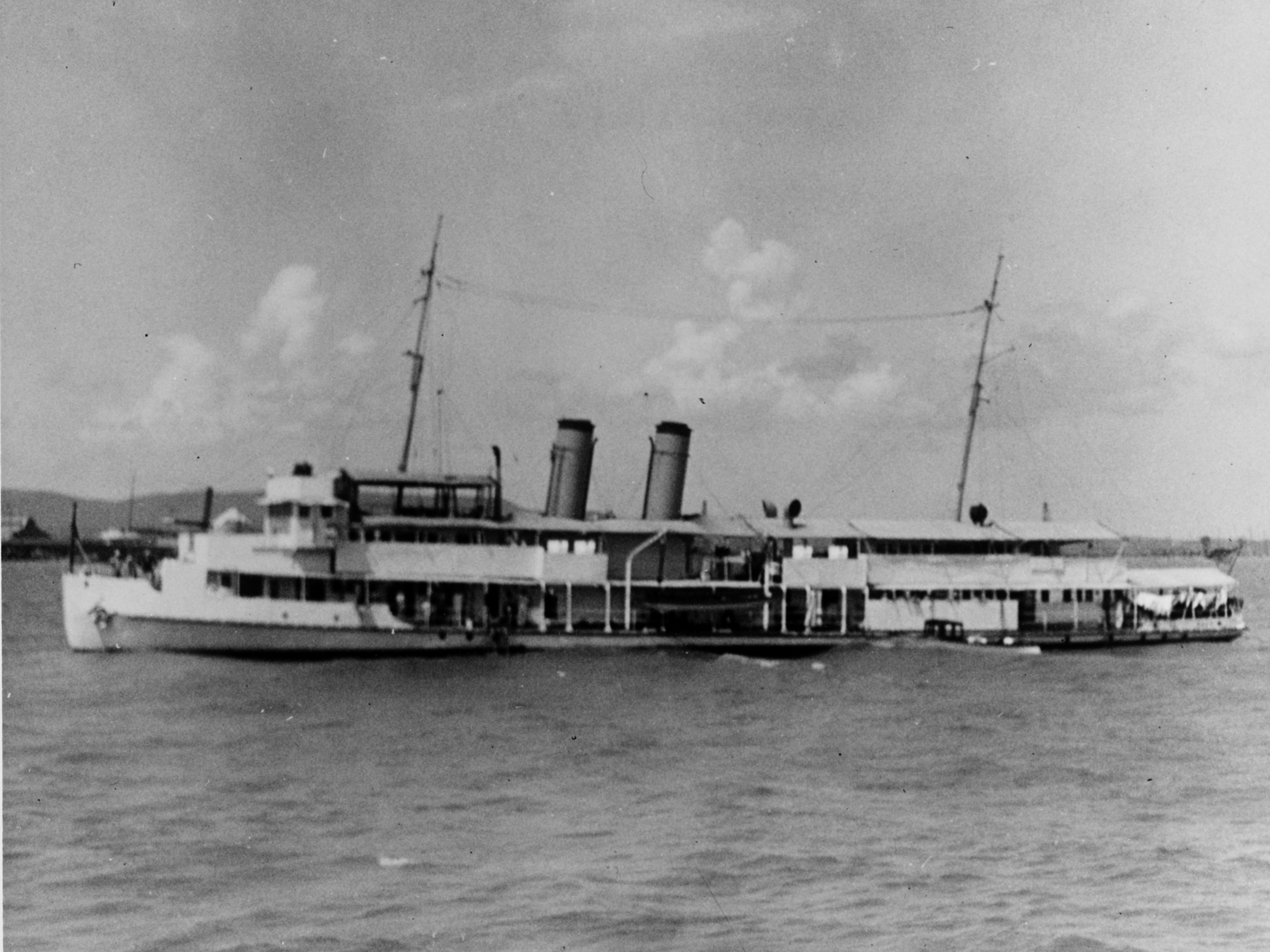
USS Oahu
(1934–1941)

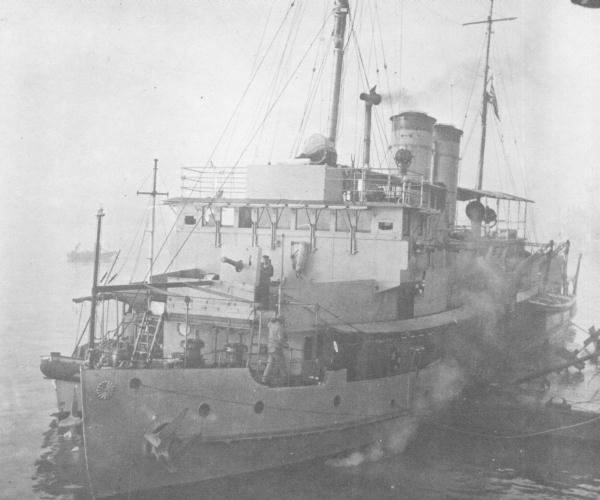
Imperial Japanese Navy ship Tatara, formerly USS Wake
(U.S. Navy service
1927–1941)

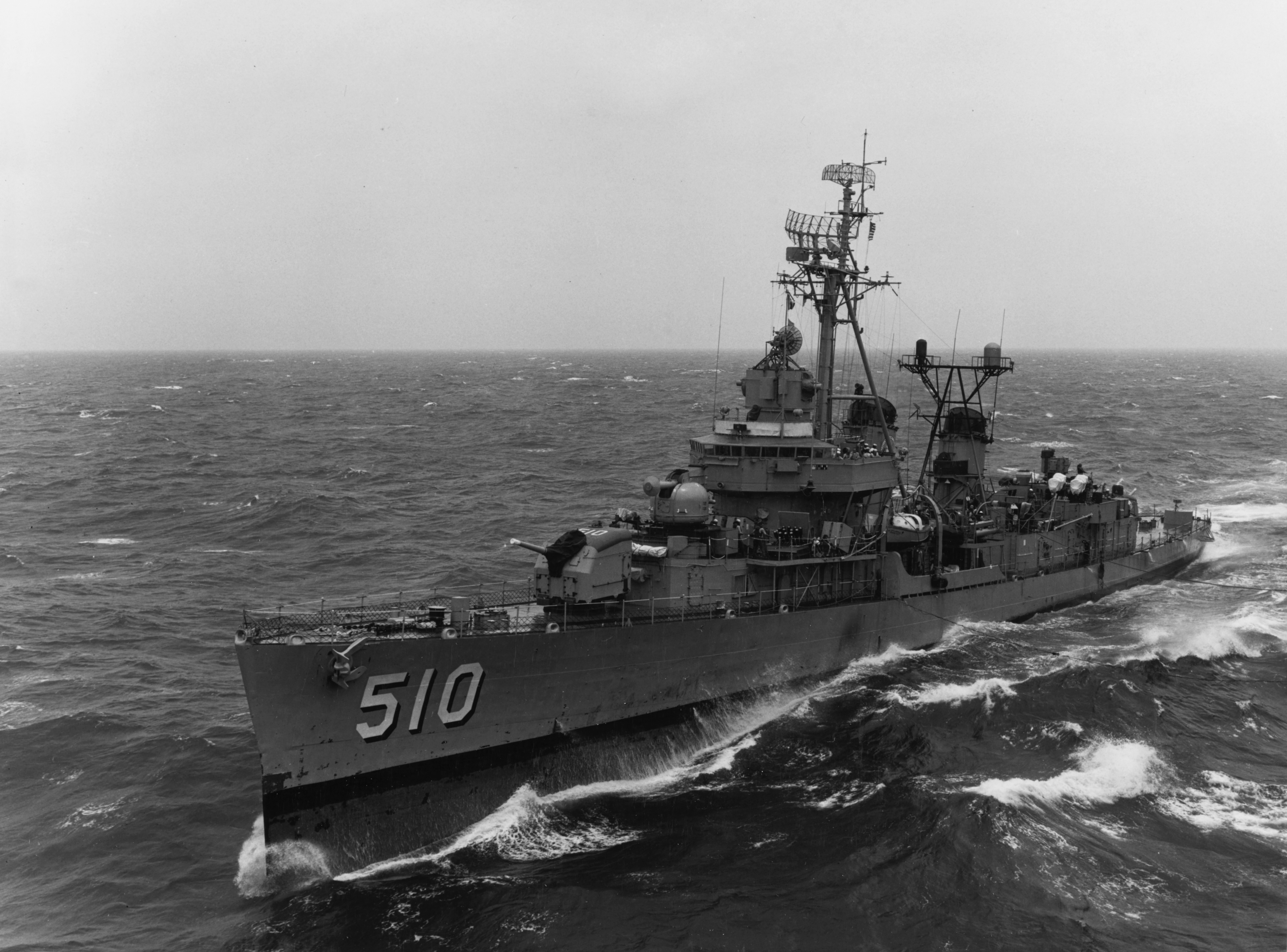
USS Eaton (1945)

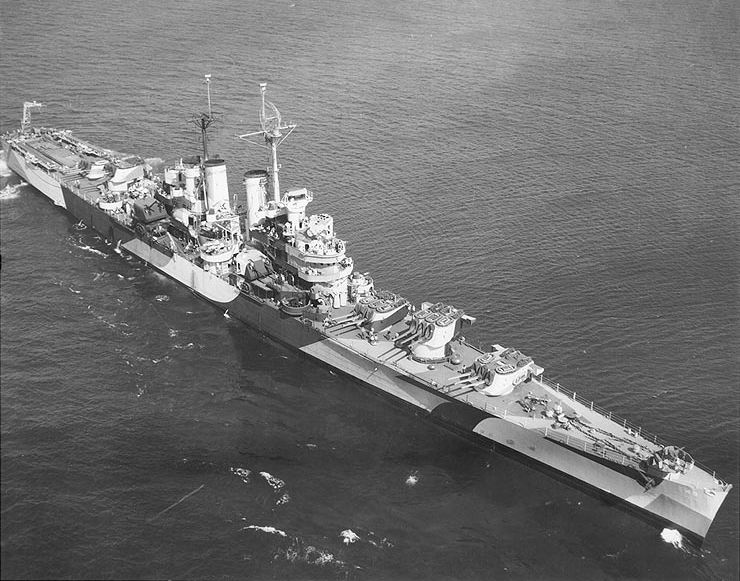
USS St. Louis (1945)

== Popular culture ==
- The fictional USS San Pablo, the Yangtze Patrol gunboat in Richard McKenna's well-known 1962 novel The Sand Pebbles, set in 1926, was modelled on the USS Villalobos, a 31-year-old vessel originally captured from Spain during the Spanish–American War in 1898. In many respects, it resembled design features of the later 1928 gunboats. McKenna served aboard one of these newer river gunboats a decade after the time of his novel. The 1966 film The Sand Pebbles was based on the novel.
- William Lederer, the author of the 1958 novel The Ugly American, served on the gunboat USS Tutuila around the same time as McKenna.
- Kemp Tolley, an officer who served as executive officer of the gunboat USS Tutuila in the 1930s, wrote Yangtze Patrol, a well-received history of the patrol.
- Actor Jack Warden was an enlisted sailor with the Yangtze Patrol in the late 1930s, before World War II.
- Fictional character Bobby Shaftoe served on the Yangtze Patrol in the Neal Stephenson book Cryptonomicon.

== See also ==
- Alice Dollar incident
- Amethyst incident
- Battle of Ty-ho Bay
- China Marines
- China Service Medal
- Extraterritoriality § China
- Gunboat diplomacy
- Nanking incident of 1927
- Operation Beleaguer
- Pirates of the South China Coast
- Yangtze Service Medal

== Sources ==
- Konstam, Angus (2011). Yangtze River Gunboats 1900–49. Oxford; Long Island City, New York: Osprey Publishing. ISBN 978-1-84908-408-6.
- Tolley, Kemp (2000). Yangtze Patrol: The U.S. Navy in China. Annapolis, Maryland: Bluejacket Books, Naval Institute Press. ISBN 978-0-87021-798-2.
