= USS Monocacy (PG-20) =

Gunboat of the United States Navy

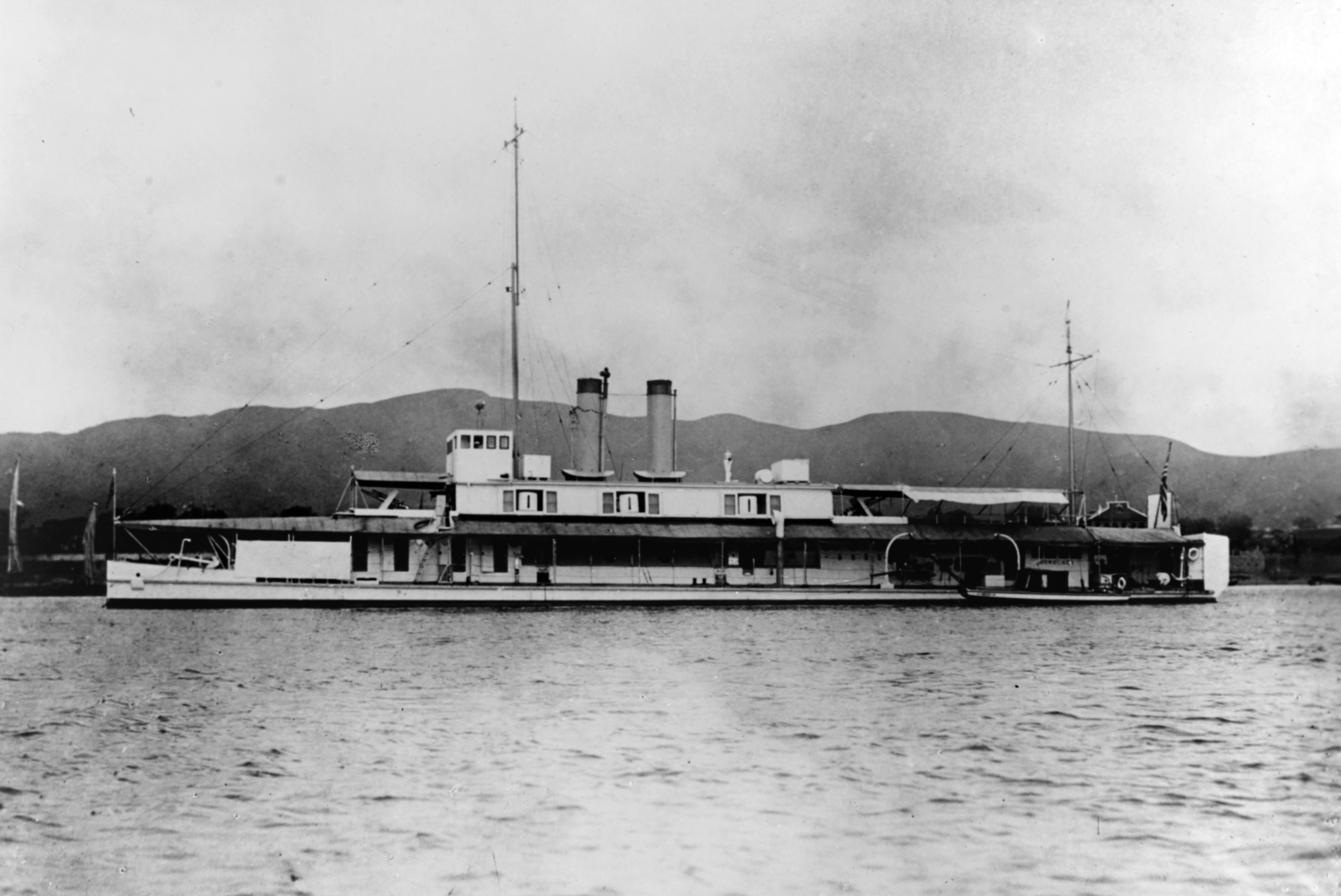

History

United States
- Name: USS Monocacy
- Namesake: Monocacy River in Maryland
- Builder: Shanghai Dock & Engineering Co.
- Laid down: 28 April 1913
- Launched: 27 April 1914
- Commissioned: 24 June 1914
- Decommissioned: 31 January 1939
- Reclassified: PG-20, June 1920; PR-2, 15 June 1928
- Fate: Scuttled, 10 February 1939

General characteristics
- Type: River gunboat
- Displacement: 204 long tons (207 t)
- Length: 165 ft 6 in (50.44 m)
- Beam: 24 ft 6 in (7.47 m)
- Draft: 2 ft 5 in (0.74 m)
- Speed: 13.25 knots (24.54 km/h; 15.25 mph)
- Complement: 52 officers and enlisted
- Armament: 2 × 6-pounder guns; 6 × machine guns

USS Monocacy was one of two shallow draft gunboats designed for service on the upper Yangtze River over 900 miles (1,400 km) inland. It was pre-constructed at Mare Island Navy Yard in 1912 and then dismantled and shipped to Shanghai, China. She was laid down by the Shanghai Dock & Engineering Co. 28 April 1913. One year later, on 27 April 1914 she was launched, sponsored by Mrs. Andrew E. Carter, and commissioned 24 June 1914.

== Service history ==
Assigned to the 2nd Division, Asiatic Fleet (formalized as the Yangtze Patrol in 1922), Monocacy sailed upriver from Shanghai on 29 June 1914 to cruise between Yichang and Chongqing. For the next 15 years, but for annual visits to Shanghai for overhaul, the gunboat patrolled the upper Yangtze with Chongqing her upriver base. Monocacy protected American interests in treaty ports down the entire length of the Yangtze, at times escorting vessels, evacuating American citizens during periods of disturbance, and, in general, assisting U.S. Consulates in various Chinese cities.

The annual springtime trip down the Yangtze for overhaul at Shanghai was timed to coincide with rising water through the Three Gorges. A sailor reaching the entertainments of Shanghai with six months' pay in his pockets from the time patrolling upriver claimed to use most of his money for liquor and women, and spend the rest foolishly.

On 16 January 1918, Chinese southern revolutionary troops attacked the little warship 50 miles (80 km) above Chénglíngjī; during which Monocacy prevented the rebels from firing on a Japanese steamer standing down stream. One crewman was killed and two others were wounded in the short but fierce fight. In June 1920, she was reclassified as PG-20 and a month later she engaged in another battle. Three years later, in February and March 1923, the gunboat operated against bandits holding up American missionaries and firing upon U.S. flag vessels above Jiangnan, rescuing the Syracuse Medical Unit and a number of American families. Later that year, she protected U.S. river commerce from warlord armies and then in August, she established friendly relations with the Governor of Jiangxi Province.

In 1927, her Commander was Randall Jacobs. Monocacy continued her patrol operations on the upper Yangtze, reclassified PR‑2 on 15 June 1928. She was placed in reserve 24 June 1929. Based at Shanghai, the gunboat cruised the lower river, making less frequent voyages to her original patrol area between Chongqing and Yichang. She was placed in full commission once again 19 September 1931 to join other American naval vessels on the river in assisting the many Chinese forced from their homes by August floods which had inundated 34,000 square miles (88,000 km^{2}) of land during the worst disaster in the river's history. In 1933, Monocacy began to serve as station ship in various treaty ports during the cruising season, with her crew serving as a landing force in case of trouble.

Monocacy was at Jiujiang protecting American neutrality during the Japanese invasion of China, when on 29 August 1938 several mines exploded within 80 yards (73 m) of the ship, showering the gunboat with fragments. She was then held at the port until the Japanese completed sweeping operations some days later. She was decommissioned at Shanghai on 31 January 1939. The veteran gunboat was towed to sea and sunk 10 February 1939 in deep water off the China coast.
