= Naval Base Manila =

Former Major United States Navy Base

- Fort San Felipe, San Roque, Cavite City; Near Cavite City in the Philippines
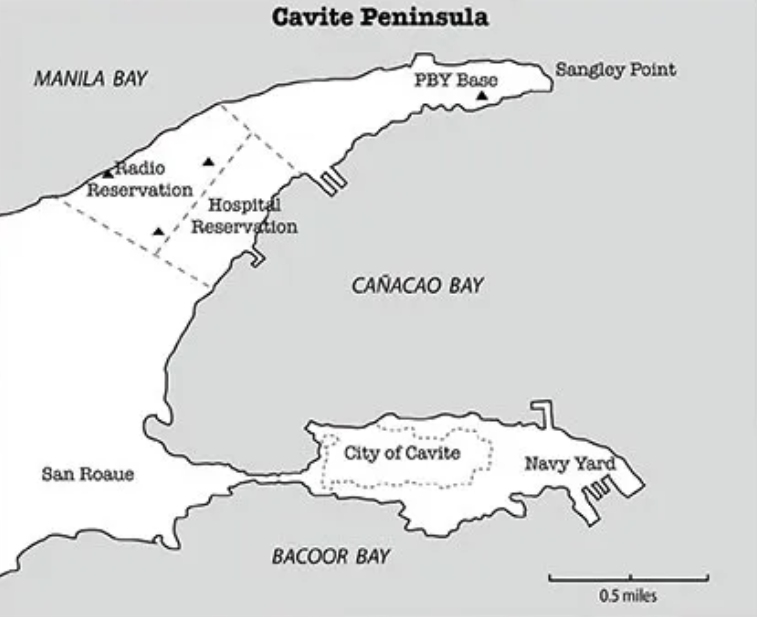
- Cavite Peninsula in 1941

Site information
- Type: US Naval base
- Owner: United States Navy 1898–1970
- Condition: Closed (turned over to the Philippine Government and was made as Naval Base Cavite)

Location
- Location in the Philippines
- Coordinates: 14°28′54″N 120°54′58″E

Site history
- Built: late 16th century
- Built by: started by Spanish East Indies
- In use: Spanish shipyard: late 16th century – early 19th century Spanish naval station: early 19th century – 1898; U.S. Naval facility: 1898–1971; Philippine Naval facility: 1971–present
- Battles/wars: Battle of Manila Bay (1898); Philippines campaign (1941–1942); Battle of Manila (1945)
- Events: Cavite Mutiny of 1872

Garrison information
- Occupants: United States Asiatic Fleet (1902–1907, 1910–1942); United States Seventh Fleet (1945–1970); Major bases: Naval Station Sangley Point; Naval Base Cavite; Mariveles Naval Section Base

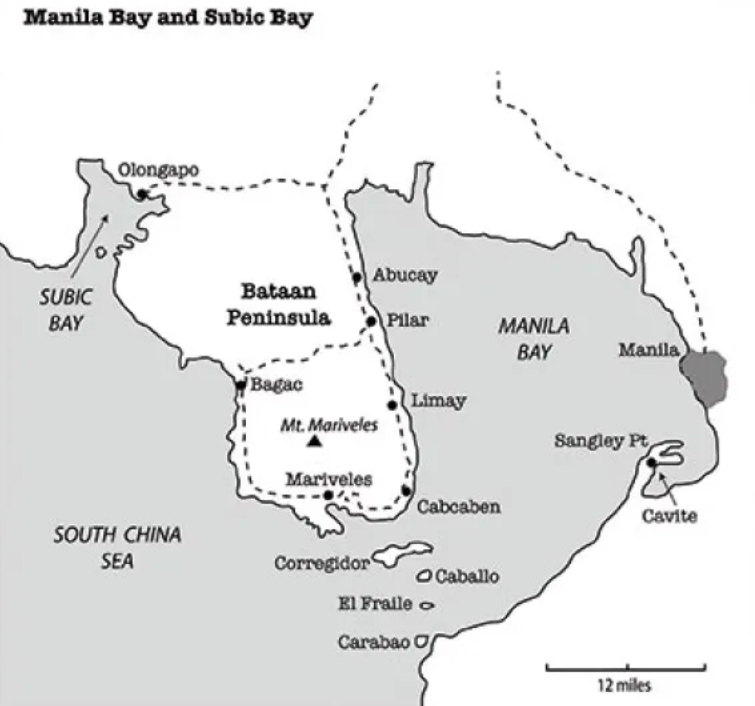
US Navy map 1941, with Naval Station Sangley Point, Cavite shipyard, Naval Base Subic Bay, an ammunition depot in Mariveles on the Bataan Peninsula, the city of Manila and Corregidor Island in Manila Bay shown

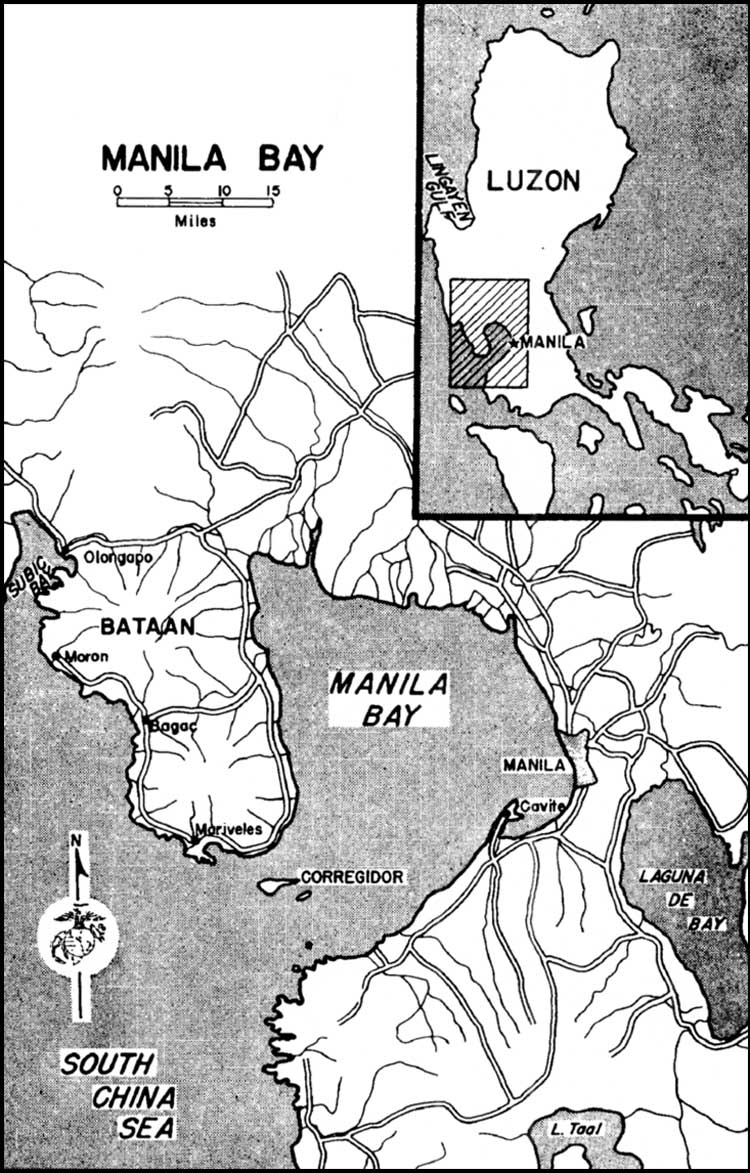
Map of Manila, Naval Base Manila is at Cavite in Manila Bay

Naval Base Manila, Naval Air Base Manila was a major United States Navy base south of the City of Manila, on Luzon Island in the Philippines. Some of the bases dates back to 1898, the end of the Spanish–American War. Starting in 1938 civilian contractors were used to build new facilities in Manila to prepare for World War II. Work stopped on December 23, 1941, when Manila was declared not defendable against the Empire of Japan southward advance, which took over the city on January 2, 1942, after the US declared it an open city. US Navy construction and repair started in March 1945 with the taking of Manila in the costly Battle of Manila ending on March 2, 1945. Naval Base Manila supported the Pacific War and remained a major US Naval Advance Base until its closure in 1971.

== History ==
The first US Navy bases were Spain's bases taken after the 1898 Battle of Manila. At the end of the Spanish–American War, Spain ceded Manila to the United States. Merchants ship from Spain and China started trading on the Sangley Peninsula in 1571. Sangley was the name given to Chinese traders, a merchant guest, in the Philippines. The two main Naval bases taken: Naval Base Cavite at Cavite City and Naval Station Sangley Point both on the Cavite Peninsula in Manila Bay, eight miles southwest of the city of Manila. The Cavite Peninsula is south of the city center of Manila. On May 1, 1898, the US Navy took over the two Naval Bases after the Battle of Manila Bay. Naval Station Sangley Point was used as a coal station for refueling ships. At the Naval Base Cavite, a repair shipyard, that Spain had called Astillero de Rivera (Rivera Shipyard), the US Navy did updates, improvements and later added a submarine base. The old Spanish hospital, run by Sisters of Charity, was taken over by the US Navy. The old hospital was replaced by a new Naval hospital, Cañacao Naval Hospital Reservation in the 1920s, this Hospital served the Navy and local population. Cañacao Naval Hospital was destroyed during the war. Starting in 1938 US and Philippines civilian contractors were used to build up the US bases at Manila. The new 1941 projects were building at Sangley Point a Seaplane base and an ammunition depot at Mariveles on the tip of Bataan Peninsula.

On December 23, 1941, it was declared that Manila was not defendable. Most civilian contractors depart Manila. US Troop were withdrawn to the Bataan Peninsula. Some Troops withdrawn to Corregidor Island in the bay, that surrendered May 6, 1942. Japanese forces took over and started using the two Manila bases in January 1942. US civilians that did not depart were detained by Japan at University of Santo Tomas-(Santo Tomas Internment Camp) and Bilibid Prisons. The University of Santo Tomas prisoner of war (POW) camp held 3,000. The two Bilibid Prisons were used as processing centers, over 13,000 POWs, mostly Americans, were held there before being put on hell ships and transferred to other POW camps. Some staff at the Naval Hospital did not evacuate, including some nurses, who became POWs with the Troops in the Battle of Bataan. The nurses became known as the Angels of Bataan for their care of the Troop till liberated in February 1945.

With the taking of Manila in 1945, in March 1945 the US Navy's Seabee, Naval Construction Battalions, began repairing the battle damage at the two bases. Soon improvement began, with new Troop arriving at Pacific War, a base for new Troops arriving was built at the Cavite naval base. With the fighting ships at war for years, a Cavite repair base and depot was built for the repair and maintenance of ships. United States Seventh Fleet headquarters moved into the 40-acre (16 ha) Manila Polo Club. At Sangley Point Seabees built a new 5,000-foot runway for Naval Air Transport Service airfield. The new airfield had 12,000-barrel tank farm, hangars, and a depot. Sangley Point seaplane base was repaired and improved, including adding a pontoon dock. The Cavite base was repaired, and a new replacement Naval hospital was built. The Manila bases and the large Fleet anchorage in Manila Bay began to build up for the expected costly invasion of Japan, planned for November 1, 1945, called Operation Downfall. With the Surrender of Japan on September 2, 1945, the invasion was not needed. The new Naval Hospital was completed and expanded. Naval Base Manila continued as US Base till 1971, when it was turned over to the Philippines Navy.

== Bases and facilities ==
- Naval Station Sangley Point (341 acres (138 ha); 1898–1941, 1945–1971, Spain 1884–1898)
  - Naval Air Station Sangley Point, 341-acre (138 ha) NAB Manila, 8,000 feet (2,400 m) runway (1945–1971) now Danilo Atienza Air Base. The Navy operated Lockheed P-2 Neptune, Lockheed P-3 Orion, Martin P4M Mercator from 1945 to 1950.
  - Cañacao Peninsula Seaplane Base at Sangley Point (1941) (Patrol Wing 10) (Japan 1941–1945 Kanakao base), US Navy (1945–1971). Locate on the south tip of Sangley Point at 14.494402°N 120.911648°E. The Navy operated patrol planes: P5M Marlin, HU-16 Albatross, and PBY Catalina at the base. The Seaplane Base closed in 1965 and is now part of Sangley Point National High School. Navy operated
  - Naval Fuel depot at Sangley Point (1938–1941, 1945–1971)
  - Cañacao Naval Hospital Reservation at Cañacao Bay (1925–1941) (Japan 1941–1945), a 27-acre (11 ha) site at14.491034°N 120.905203°E that was destroyed during the war (also see Angels of Bataan). It replaced Spain's 1875 hospital.
  - Radio station at Sangley Point: three 600-foot (180 m) steel antenna towers (1915–1945). North antenna was at 14.494284°N 120.899401°E, the other two antenna towers were next to the Cañacao Naval Hospital Reservation. Removed to build 8,000-foot runway.
  - Crash boat base
  - US Coast Guard Air Station Sangley Point, US Coast Guard run LORAN, long-range navigation (1946–1970)
  - United States Marine Corps Camp (1945–1970)
  - John Paul Jones School at Sangley Point opened for children of base staff (1945–1971)
  - Power plant
  - Sangley Point Ship Yard, two marine railways for ship repair, next to the seaplane base.
    - Varadero de Manila Shipyard, (1957–1970) the US Navy shipyard at Sangley Point was turned over for private use after the Korean war in 1957. Located between the seaplane base and the former Cañacao Naval Hospital Reservation at 14.493265°N 120.908952°E. Now a boat dock.
- Naval Base Cavite (50-acre (20 ha) Cavite Navy Yard and Sub Base) (1898–1941, 1945–1971), now Naval Station Pascual Ledesma
  - Cavite Submarine base (1919-1960s)
  - Cavite Naval Fuel depot
  - Torpedo repair shop
  - PT boat Base (Squadron 3, 1940–1941) (1945–1946)
  - Ammunition depot
  - Cavite ship repair, ship repair and salvage, one boat marine railway (1925–1941, 1945–1971)
  - Power plant
  - Cavite Naval Hospital (1945–1971) at 14.482996°N 120.914515°E
- Mariveles Naval Section Base opened July 22, 1941.
  - Ammunition depot at Mariveles on the tip of Bataan Peninsula
  - Mariveles Naval Port, the bay at Mariveles had an anti-submarine net to protect the ship there. (1941, 1945–1971) Net layers:USS Buckeye, USS Silverbell (AN-51)
  - Mariveles Seaplane base, at the Mariveles port a seaplane ramp and base was built at 14.430802°N 120.485315°E.
  - Mariveles Quarantine Hospital, now Mariveles Mental Wellness and General Hospital
  - Supply depot – tank farm
  - Mariveles Airfield, one dirt 3,800-foot runway at Bataan 14.45°N 120.50°E complete on February 23, 1942. Used by US Army and Navy, with nearby Army Camp. Mariveles Airfield surrendered on April 10, 1942, and from there the Bataan Death March began. Airfield was retaken in February 1945.
  - Submarine Squadron 2
  - US Army camp
- Radar stations
- Mess halls and Barracks at all three bases
- Corregidor Island in Manila Bay (1941–1942), two Naval docks, lost in Battle of Corregidor, retaken in 1945.
  - Malinta Tunnel, built by the United States, from 1922 to 1932 as a bomb-proof storage depot and Troop bunker. Due to many wounded troops a 1,000-bed hospital was added. Built on Corregidor Island, at 14.38791406°N 120.59064738°E.
  - Harbor Defenses of Manila and Subic Bays, four US Army forts on islands at the entrance to Manila Bay. Naval mines blocked the entrance to the Port of Manila and Manila Bay for protection. On the north side of Corregidor Island, the two mines fields could be electrically be turned on and off by controls on Corregidor Island, so US ships could use the bay safely.
  - US Navy Cryptologist Admiral Ernest J. King and other Naval intelligence personnel were taken off Corregidor by submarines on April 8, 1942.
  - Key personnel were taken off the Corregidor in Operation Flight Gridiron by two Consolidated PBY Catalina from Naval Base Perth on April 29, 1942. The mission was one of the longer rescue missions ever.
- Manila Bay Naval Fleet anchorage (1898–1941, 1945–1971) (once obstacles cleared in 1945)
- Port of Manila for supply depot and shore leave. (1898–1941, 1945–1971)
- Naval supply depot in the City of Manila (1898–1941, 1945–1971)
- Sternberg General Hospital in Manila (US 1898–1941), destroyed during the war.
- Manila Army and Navy Club (1925–1941) (Japan 1941–1945)
- Bilibid Prison (1945–1946), used by the US to hold Japanese accused of war crimes, Tomoyuki Yamashita was held at the Prison till execution.
- Manila Hotel used both by US and Japan during the war.
- U.S. Naval Radio Facility Bagobantay (1945–1962)
- Fleets:
- United States Asiatic Fleet parts stationed at Manila (1902–1907, 1910–1942)
  - United States Asiatic Fleet's Station CAST intelligence and radio (1938–1942)
  - Motor Torpedo Boat Squadron Three (1941–1942)
  - Submarine tenders Ships:USS B-1, USS B-2 and USS B-3
- United States Seventh Fleet headquarters, in the former 40-acre (16 ha) Manila Polo Club (1945)
- Fleet Post Office FPO# 3142 SF Manila

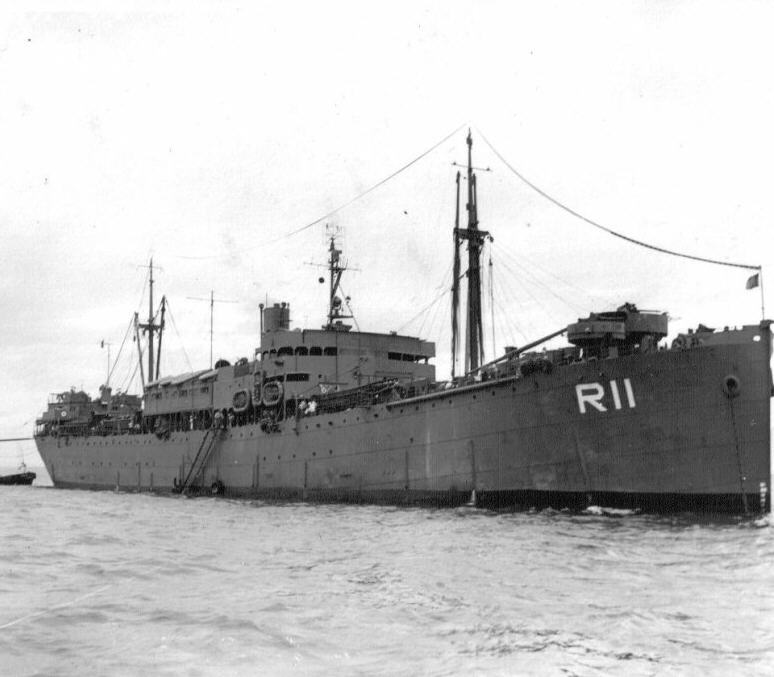
USS Rigel (AD-13), a repair ship, at anchor in Manila Bay in 1945

== Naval Base Manila repair base ==
Naval Base Manila was a major repair base, bases at the repair facilities:

- Marine railways as dry docks
- Repair docks and piers
- Service Squadron
- Part depots
- Machine shops
- Engineering camp
- Chemical Engineering Camp
- Small boat pool
- Motor pool
- USS Jason (AC-12)
- USS Beaver
- USS Medusa (AR-1)
- USS Rigel (AD-13)
- USS Leyte (ARG-8)
- USS Holland (AS-3)
- USS Obstructor
- USS Wright (AV-1)
- USS Currituck (AV-7)
- USS Salisbury Sound (AV-13)
- USS Gardiners Bay (AVP-39)

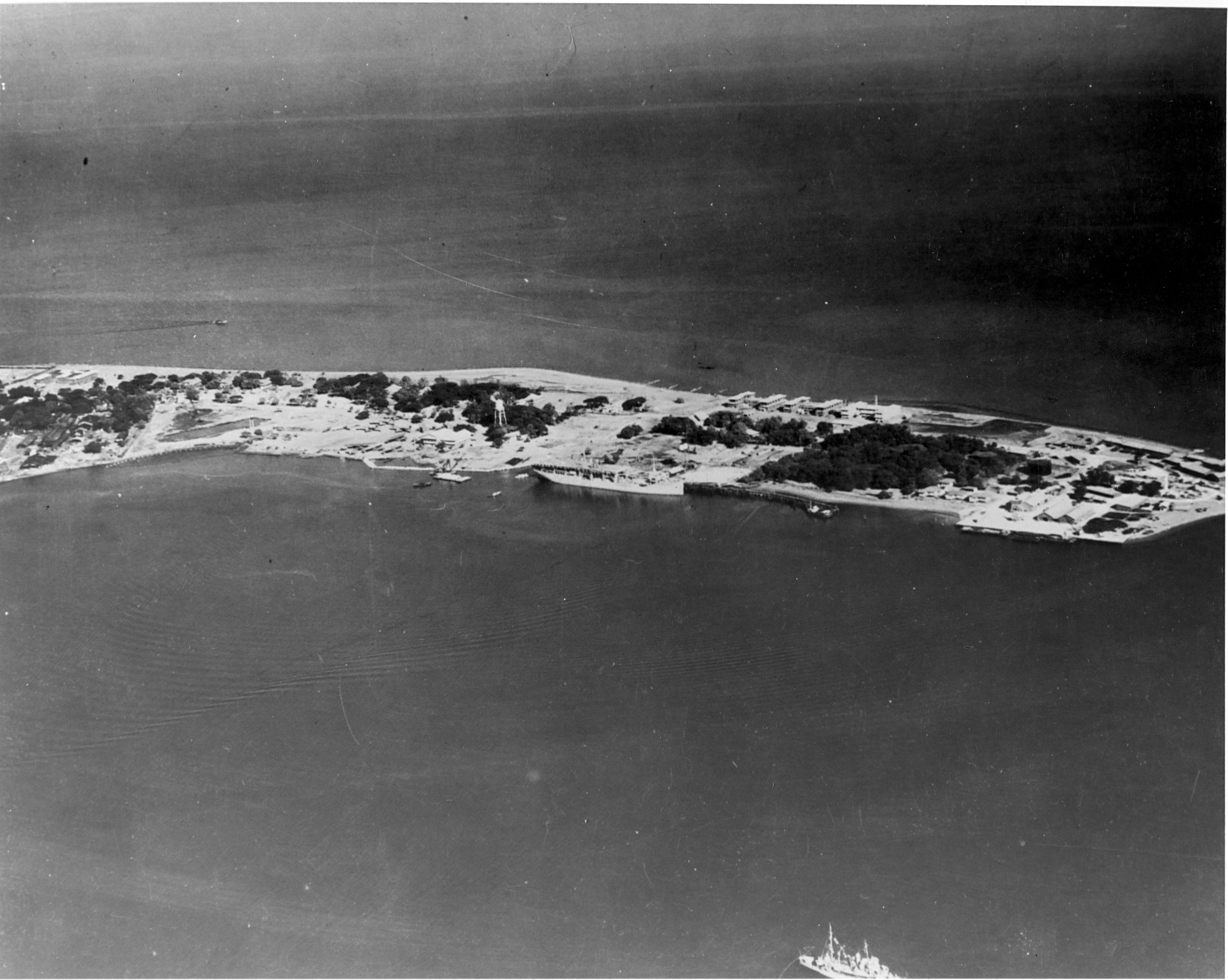
Sangley Point 1941, with USS Langley AV-3 docked

== Auxiliary Airfields ==
US Naval Station Sangley Point in 1966, seaplane base was to the right of the Varadero de Manila Shipyard

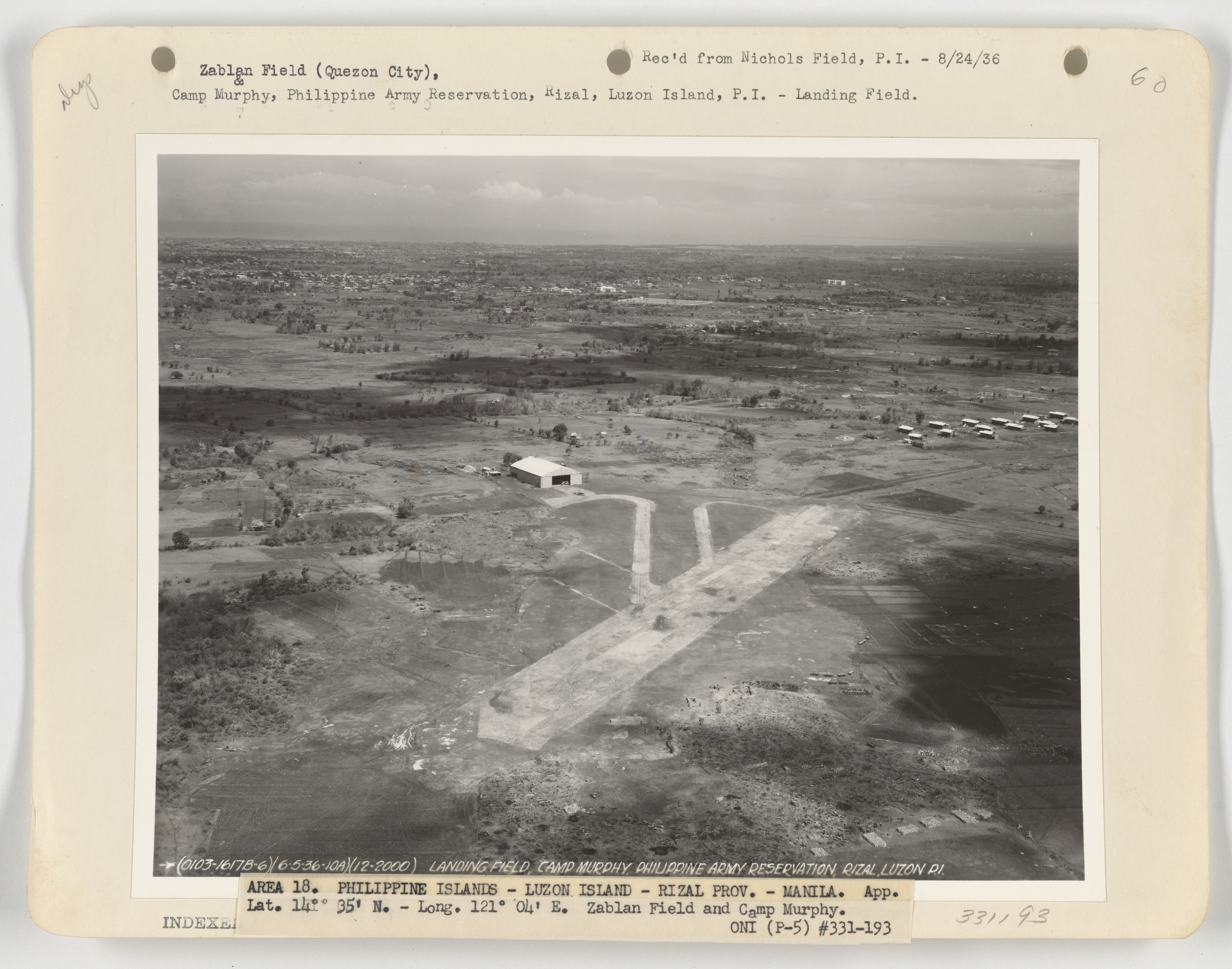
Zablan Auxiliary Airfield in 1936

Manila auxiliary airfields included:

- Bataan Airfield: Located on the east side of Bataan Peninsula, constructed in 1941 and used by US Army and Navy. Surrendered on April 10, 1942, with POWs becoming part of the Bataan Death March.
- Nichols Field: Established in 1919 for US Army and Navy aircraft maintenance. Lost during the war, it was reutilized from 1945 to 1947 by the Army and Naval Air Transport Service (NATS). Now known as Villamor Air Base and Ninoy Aquino International Airport, under the jurisdiction of Pasay.
- Nielson Field: Initially a private airport built in 1937, it was taken over for defense in 1941 but later captured by Japan. Used by the US (APO 75) in 1945 and returned to civilian use in 1946, closing permanently in 1947. Now part of the Makati Central Business District in Makati.
- North Avenue Airfield (Quezon Airfield): A small auxiliary airstrip on the Diliman Estate in Quezon City at 14°39′13″N 121°2′17″E, now part of North Avenue, EDSA, and Quezon Avenue.
- Balara Airfield (Quezon New Airfield): Used as an auxiliary airfield in Caloocan, is now occupied by residential houses in what is now Quezon City.
- Zablan Auxiliary Airfield: Built before the war as an emergency runway at 14.609875°N 121.078753°E, it closed after the war. It is now part of Camp Aguinaldo.
- Mandaluyong East Airfield: Built by Japan but not developed by the US, now part of Shaw Boulevard in Mandaluyong and Pasig.
- Pasig Airfield: Built by Japan but not developed by the US, it was used as an emergency runway at 14.583526942582386°N 121.10226775768227°E in Pasig, running in parallel to a railroad. It is now part of residential areas in Barangay Santa Lucia, Pasig.
- Grace Park Airfield (Manila North Airfield): Built by Japan, used by the US Army, and later as an emergency runway in 1945 at 14.646844°N 121.983250°E. Located in Grace Park, Caloocan.
- Dewey Boulevard Airfield: Built by Japan and not developed by the US due to its waterfront location, was briefly utilized for the movement of planes. Located in Ermita near the US Embassy, which functioned as a parking area for aircraft during that time. Now Roxas Boulevard at 14.570947°N 120.982011°E.
- Marikina Airfield: Located in Marikina, liberated by Naval Base Manila in 1945, and converted into a sports field.

== Seabee units ==
Seabee units working at Naval Base Manila:

- 12th Naval Construction Regiment
- 77th Battalion
- 119th Battalion
- ACORN-45

== Losses ==
- Ships and boats losses at Manila:
  - Scuttled by her crew so Japan could not use: USS Dewey (YFD-1), USS Canopus (AS-9), Yacht Maryann, Tug TT Vaga, USS Sara Thompson (AO-8), Yacht Perry, Fisheries II, SS Capillo, SS Bohol, SS Dos Hermanos, SS Magallanes, SS Montanes, USS Canopus, USS Luzon (PG-47), USS Oahu, USS Quail, USS Napa (AT-32), USS Mindanao (PR-8), USS Bittern (AM-36), USS Bittern (AM-36), USAMP Col. George F. E. Harrison, USS Genesee refloated by Japan, USS Sealion (SS-195), USS Grayling (SS-209), USS YMS-48, Mambukai and PT boats: PT-31, PT-32, PT-33, PT-35, PT-41, Q-112, Q-113 and Q-111.
  - Sank in action: USS Pigeon (ASR-6), USS YAG-4, USS Tanager (AM-5), Trabajador, USS Grayling (SS-209), USS Neptune, Tug Henry Keswick, SS Bisayas, SS Daylite, Henry Keswick, SS Anakan, USLHT Canlaon, USLHT Banahao, USS Pompey, SS Kaiping, S Mauban, SS Hai Kwang, SS Seistan, SS Palawan, SS Ethel Edwards, USS Si Kiang, SS Tantalus, SS Samal, SS Paz, USS Manatawny, LCS(L)(3)-7, LCS(L)(3)-26, LCS(L)(3)-49, SS Viscaya, SS Corregidor, USS Finch (AM-9) (refloated by Japan), Q-114, and PT-34.
  - Damaged: USS Fletcher (DD-445), Tug Ranger and USS Hopewell (DD-681) hit in 1945.

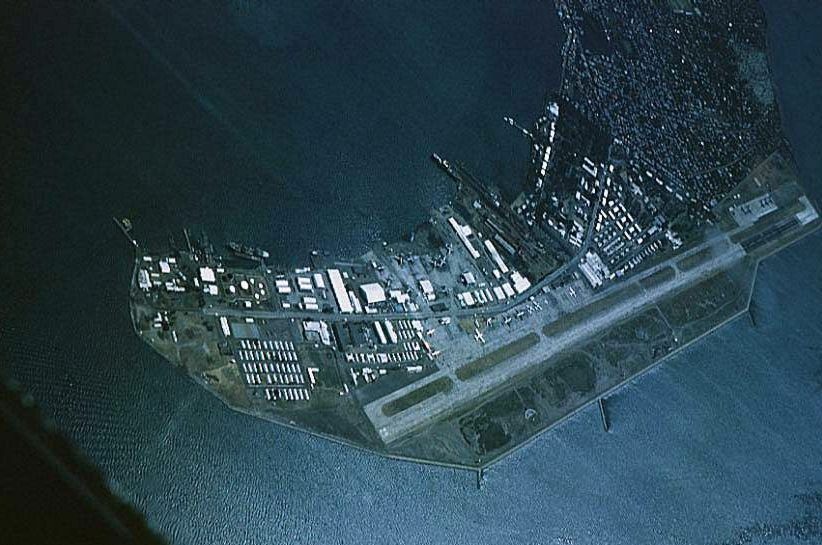
Overhead view of the Sangley Point facilities in the 1960s.

- Captured: Yacht BRP Banahaw

== Gallery ==
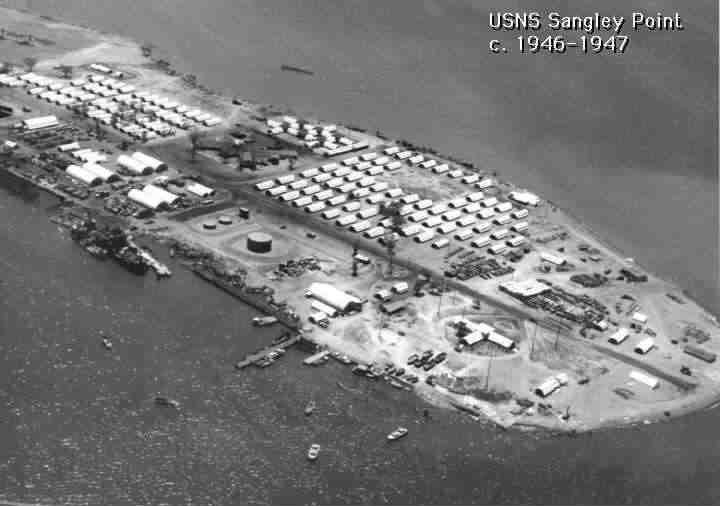
US Naval Station Sangley Point in 1947, with Quonset hut, barracks, shops, supply depot, mess hall and more.

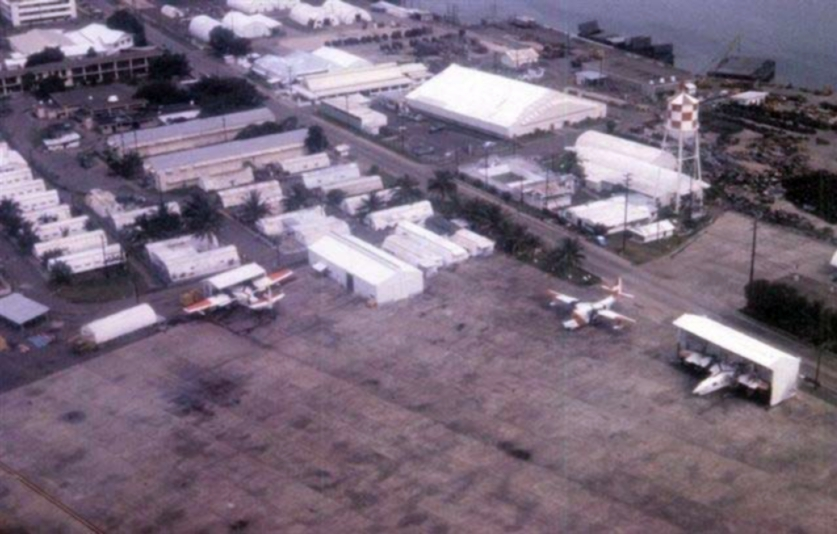
Seaplane Base at Sangley Point.

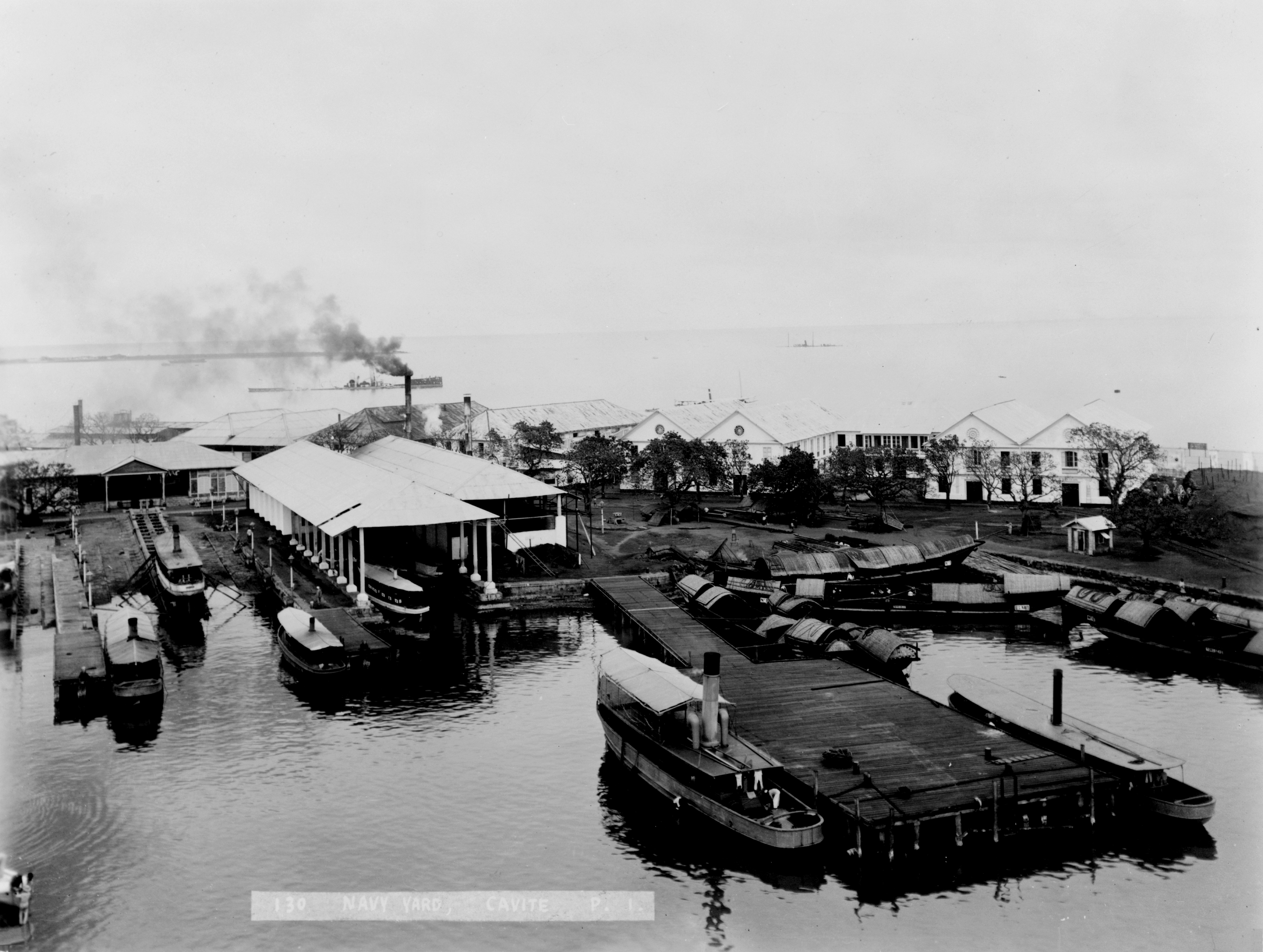
Cavite Navy Yard docks in 1899, year after it became a US Navy Shipyard

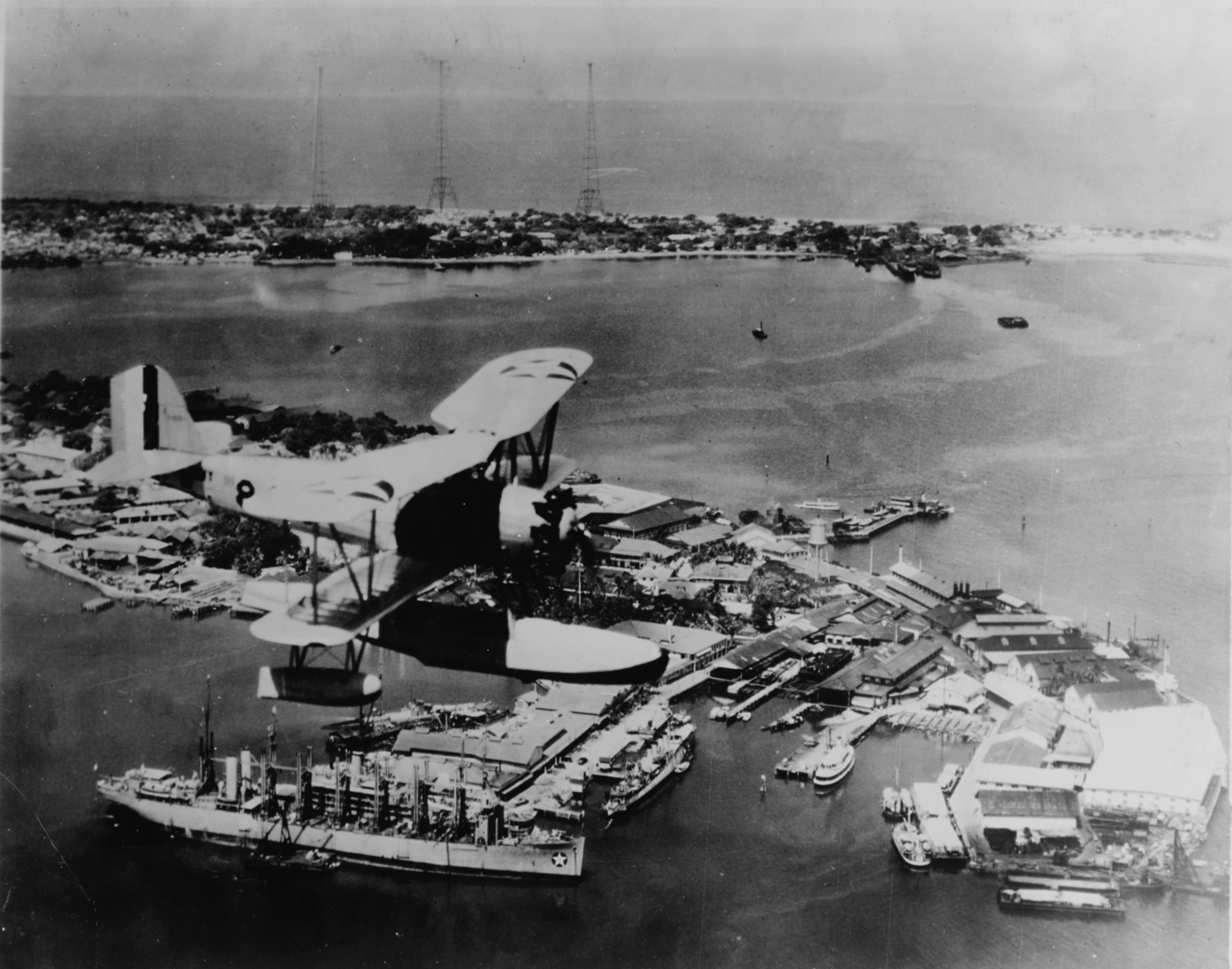
A O2U floatplane flies over the Cavite Navy Yard, in 1930, below seaplane tender USS Jason and Sangley Point

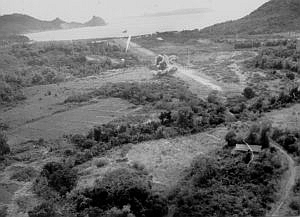
Bataan Peninsula on 24 January 1945, with Mariveles Seaplane base, port and Airfield. Japan is bombing the runway. Mariveles surrendered on April 10, 1942, the start of Bataan Death March. Mariveles was retaken in February 1945

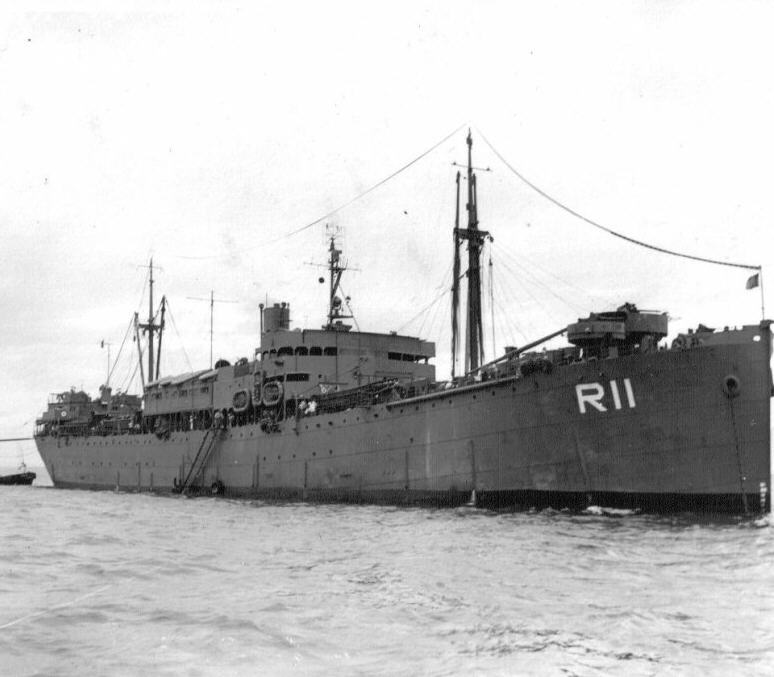
USS Rigel (AR-11), a repair ship in Manila Bay

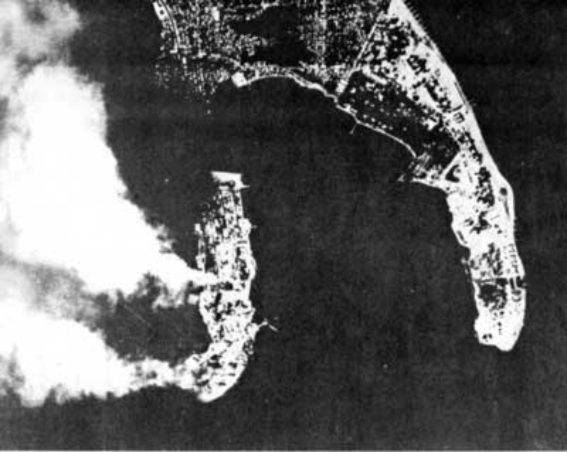
Cavite Navy Yard bombed by Japan on December 10, 1941. Smoke rises from Cavite Navy Yard.

Submarine USS Shark (SS-8) at the Cavite Navy Yard 1911

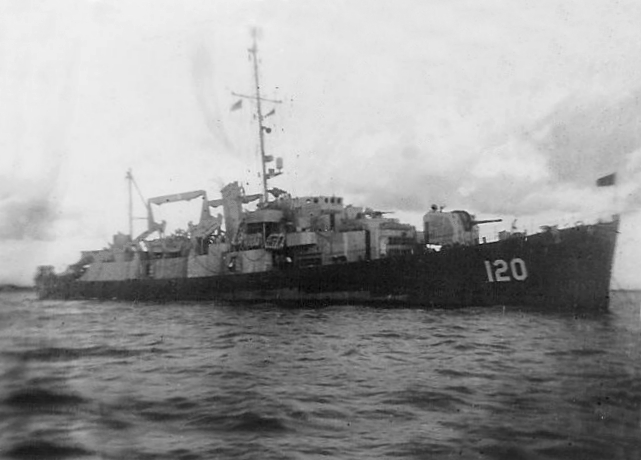
USS Kline (APD-120) anchored off Manila in July 1945

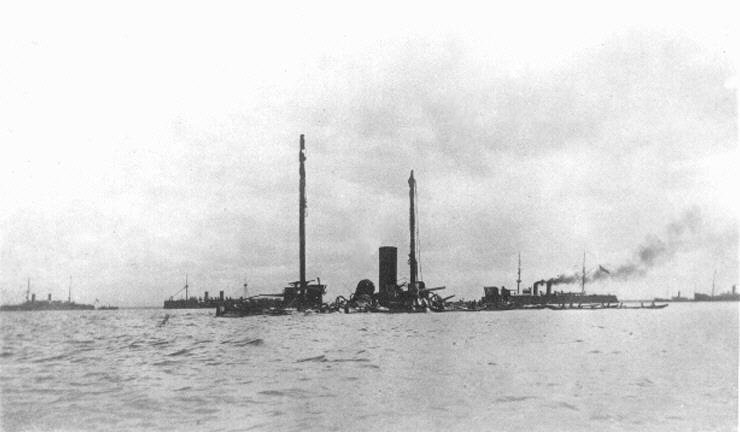
The wreck of the Spanish Navy cruiser Castilla after the Battle of Manila Bay in 1898.

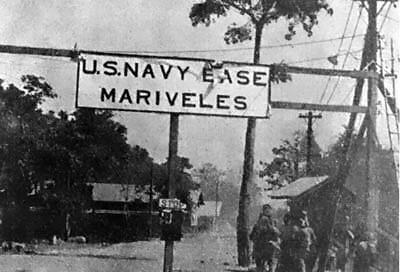
Entrance to Naval Base Mariveles after the fall of Bataan.

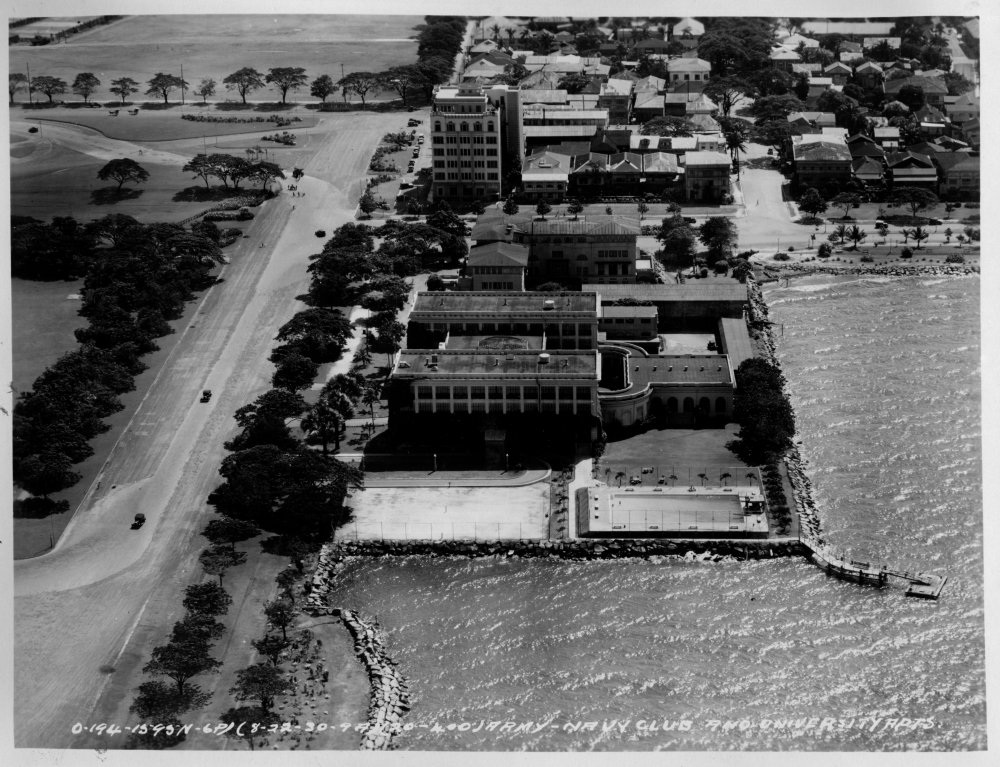
Manila Army and Navy Club

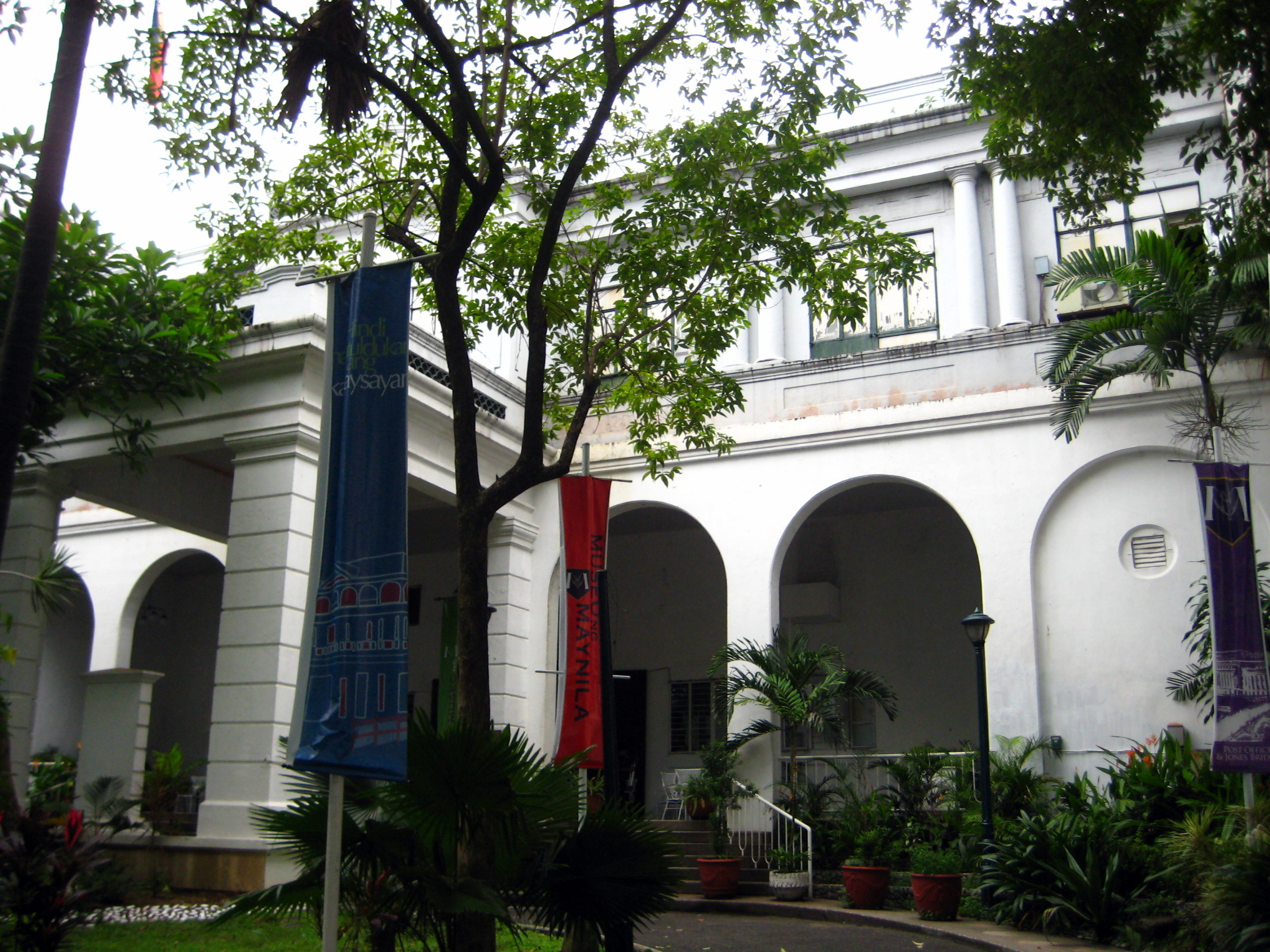
Manila Army and Navy Club

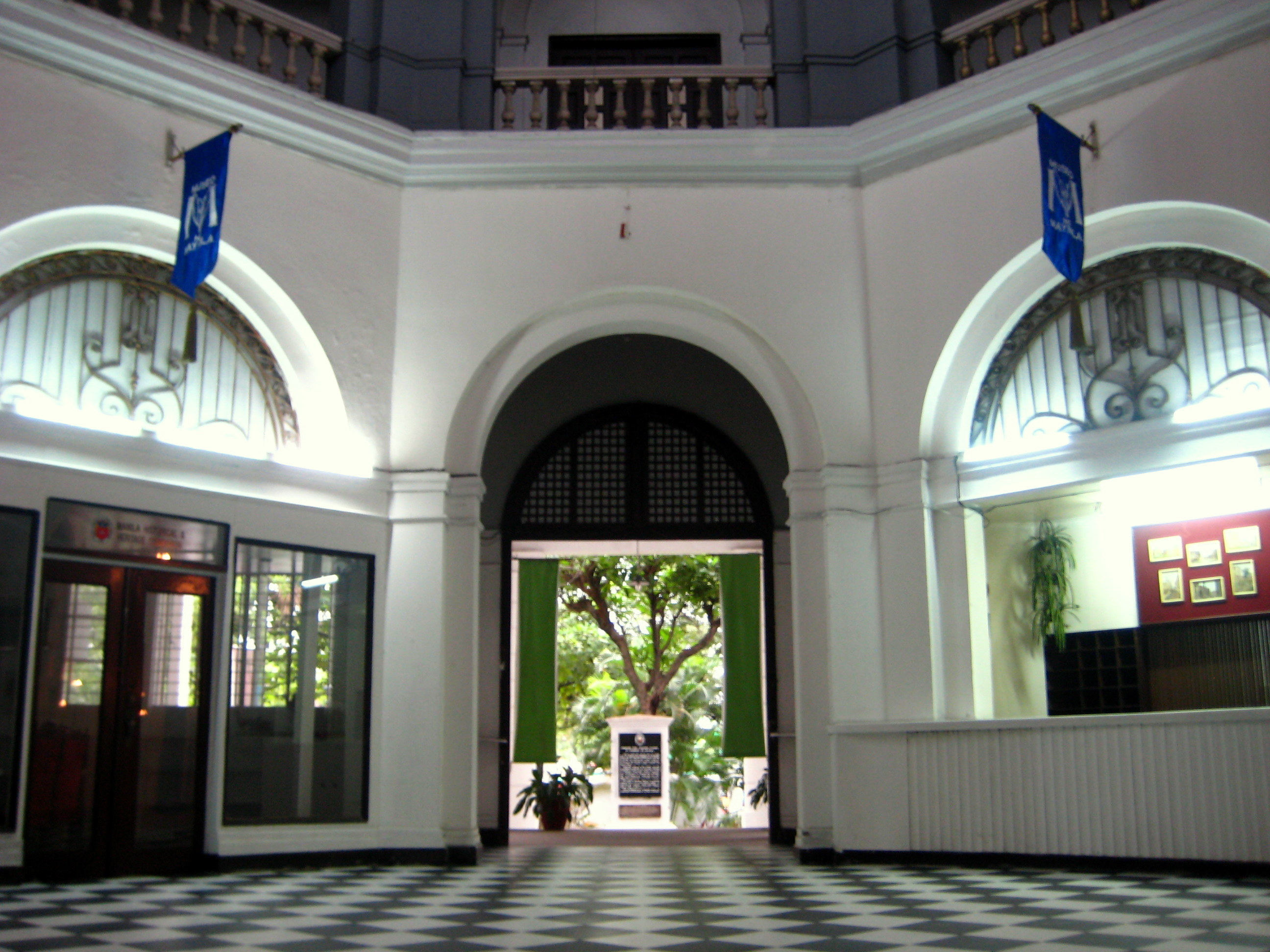
Manila Army and Navy Club Reception Area

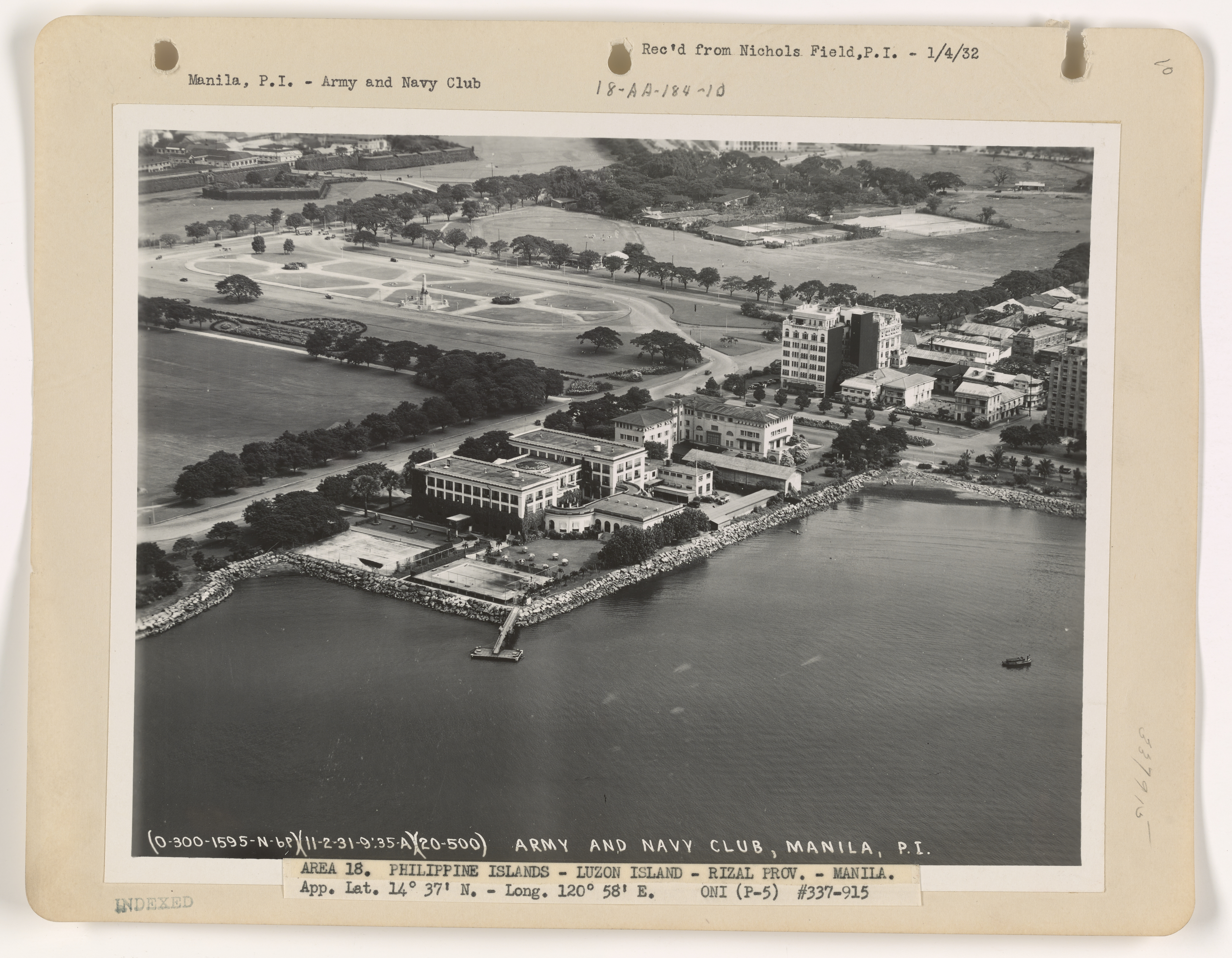
Manila Army and Navy Club in 1932

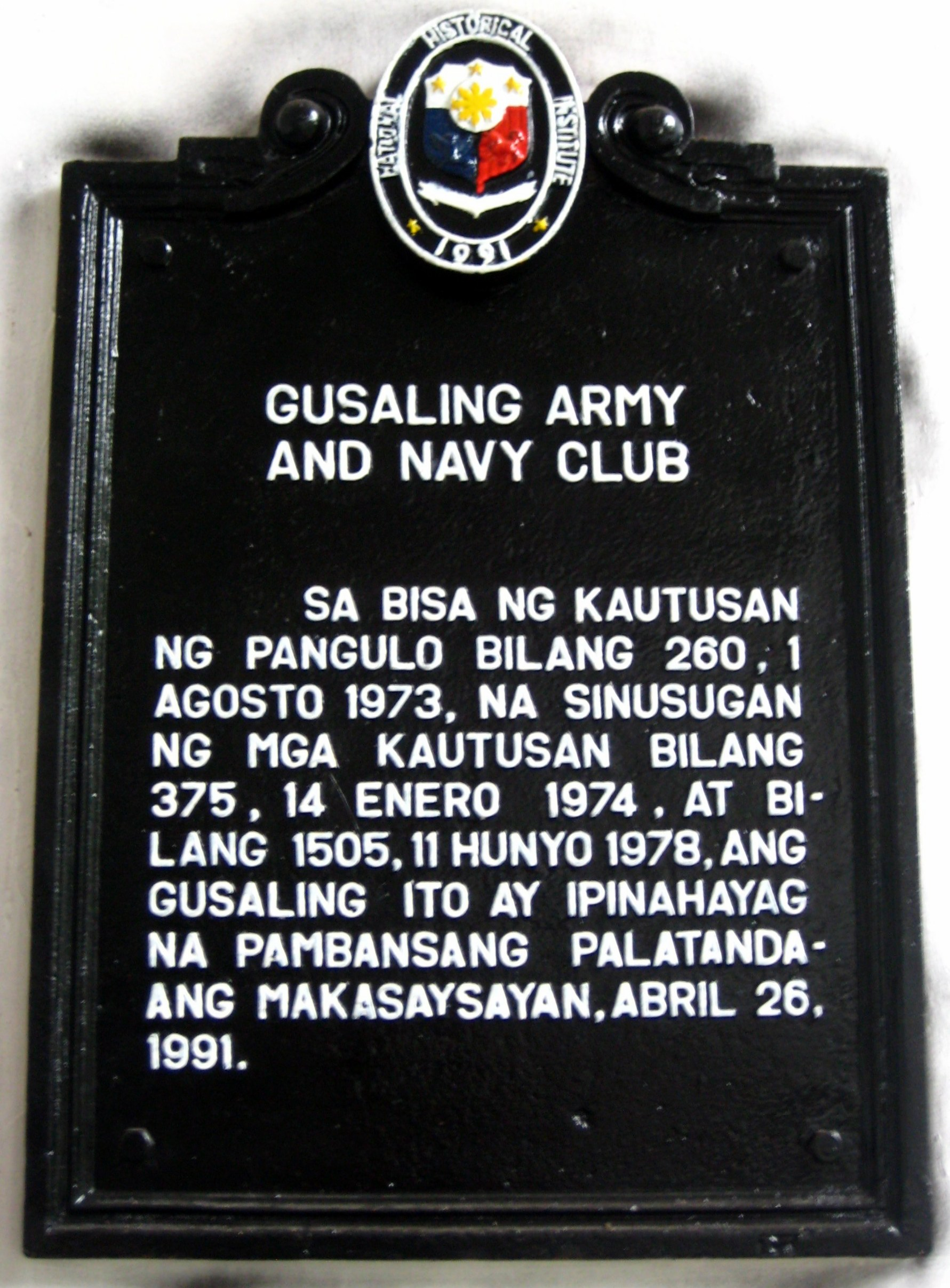
Manila Army and Navy Club Historical Marker

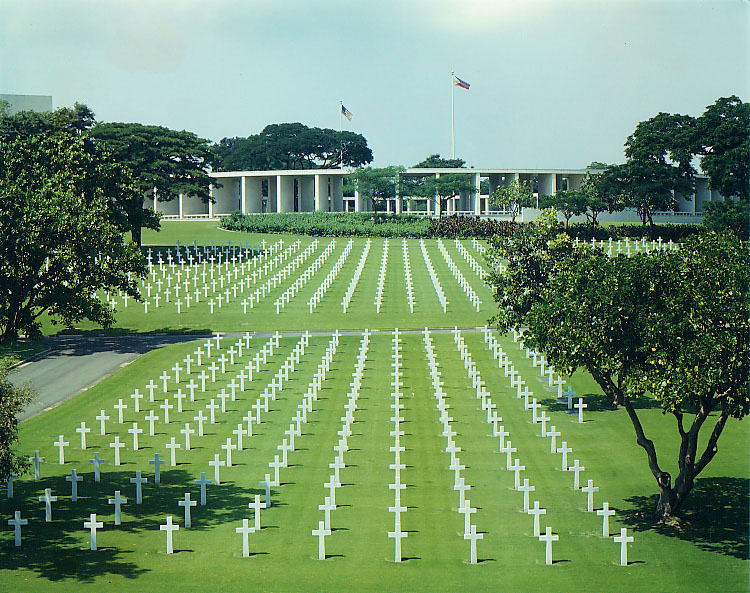
Manila American Cemetery and Memorial

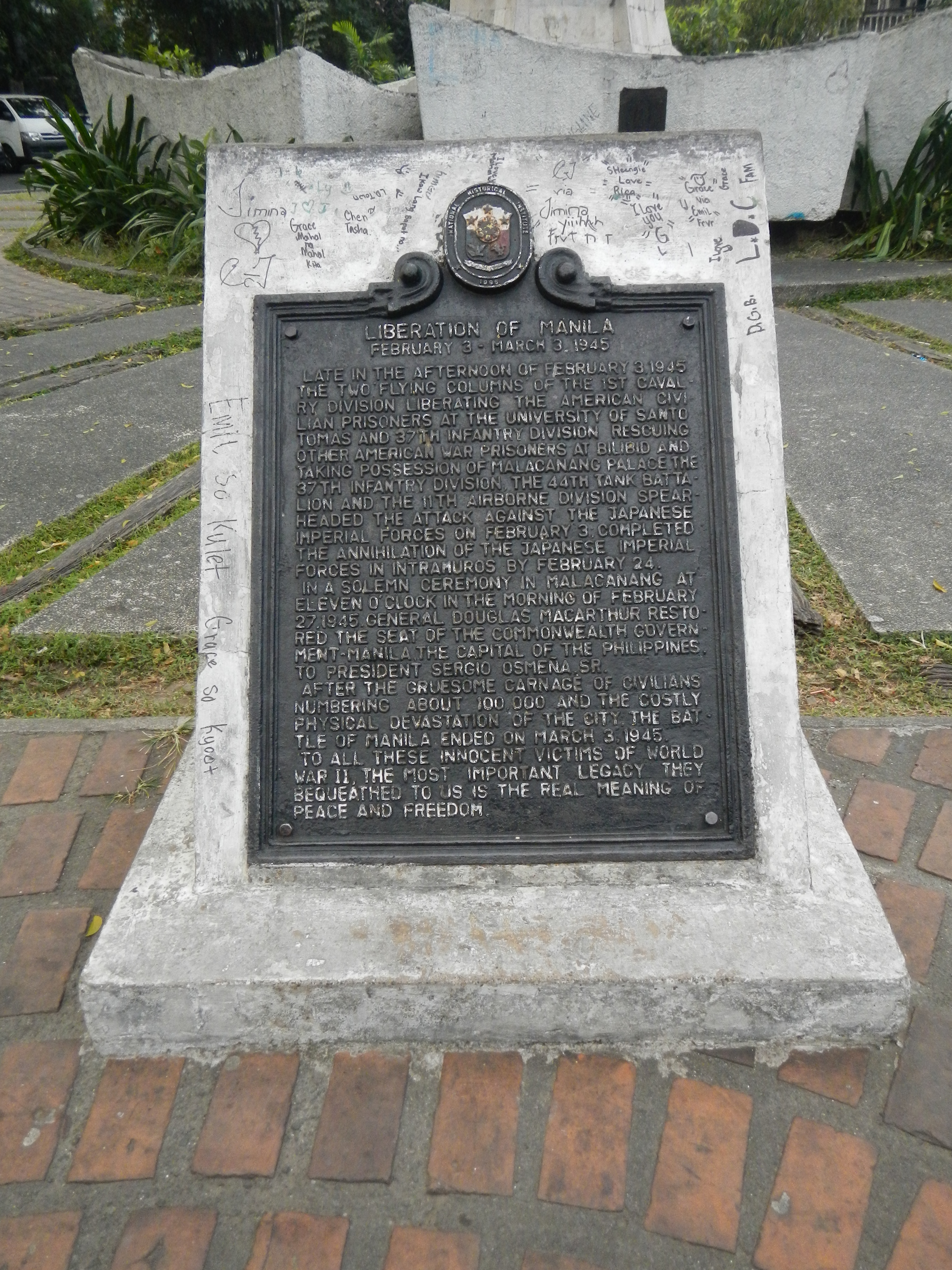
Battle of Manila (1945) Historical Marker at Malacañang Palace

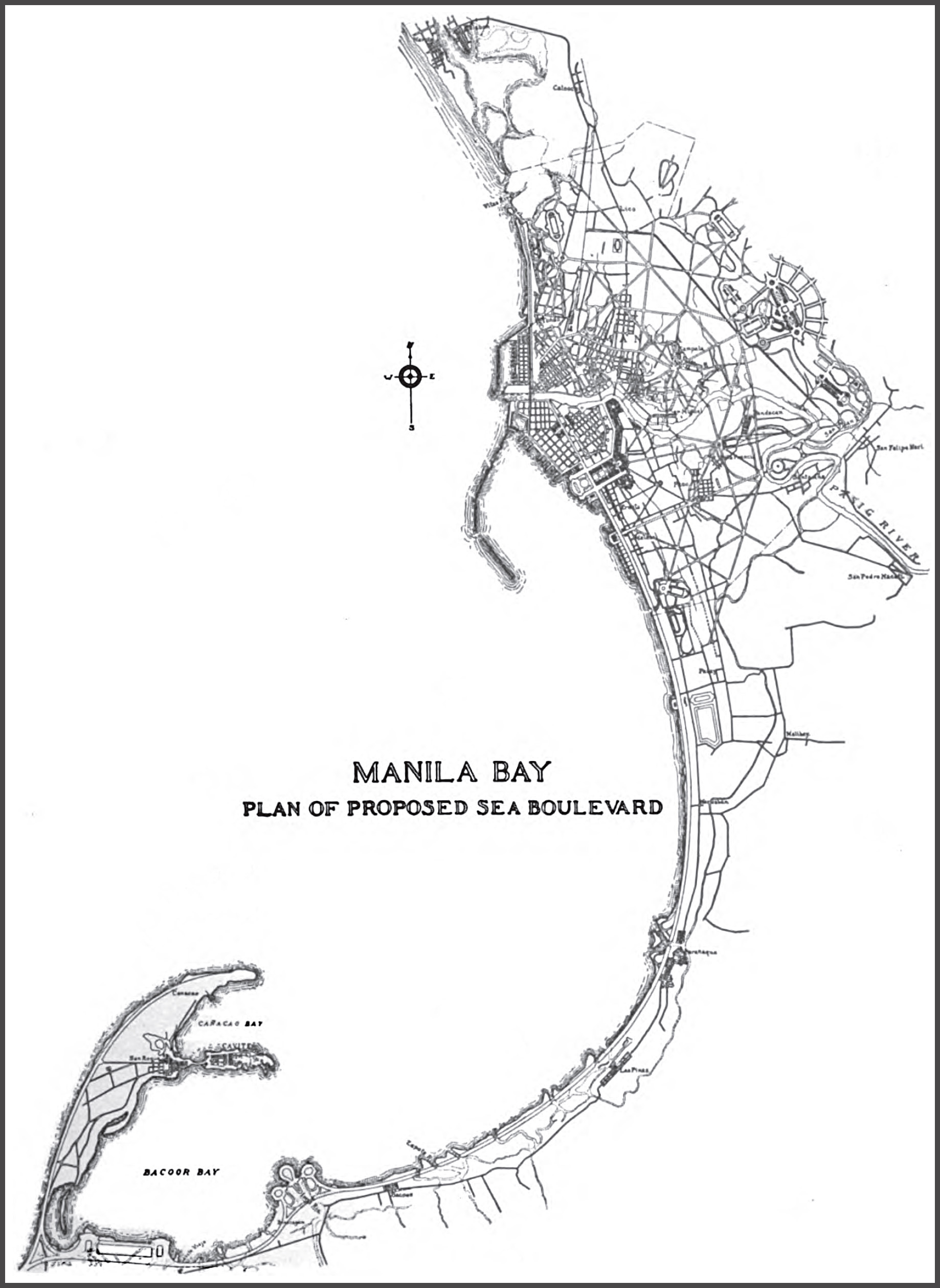
Manila Bay and Cavite in the bay

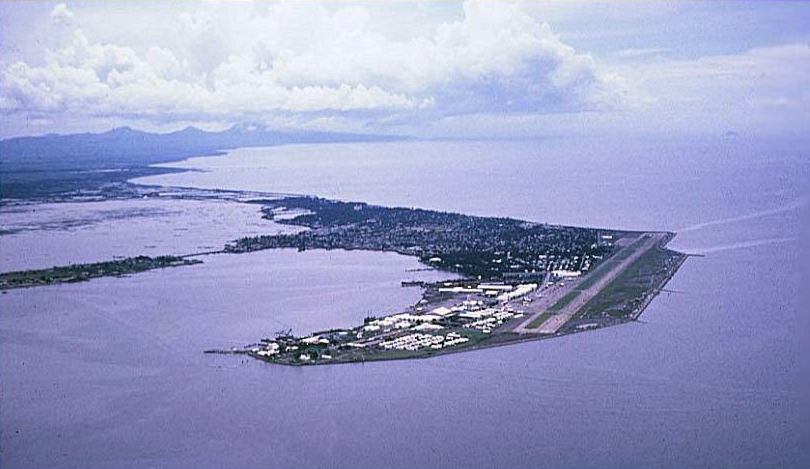
Naval Station Sangley Point in 1964

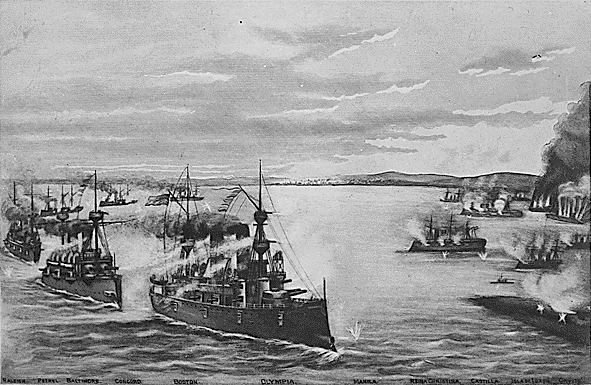
Manila Bay Battle in 1898

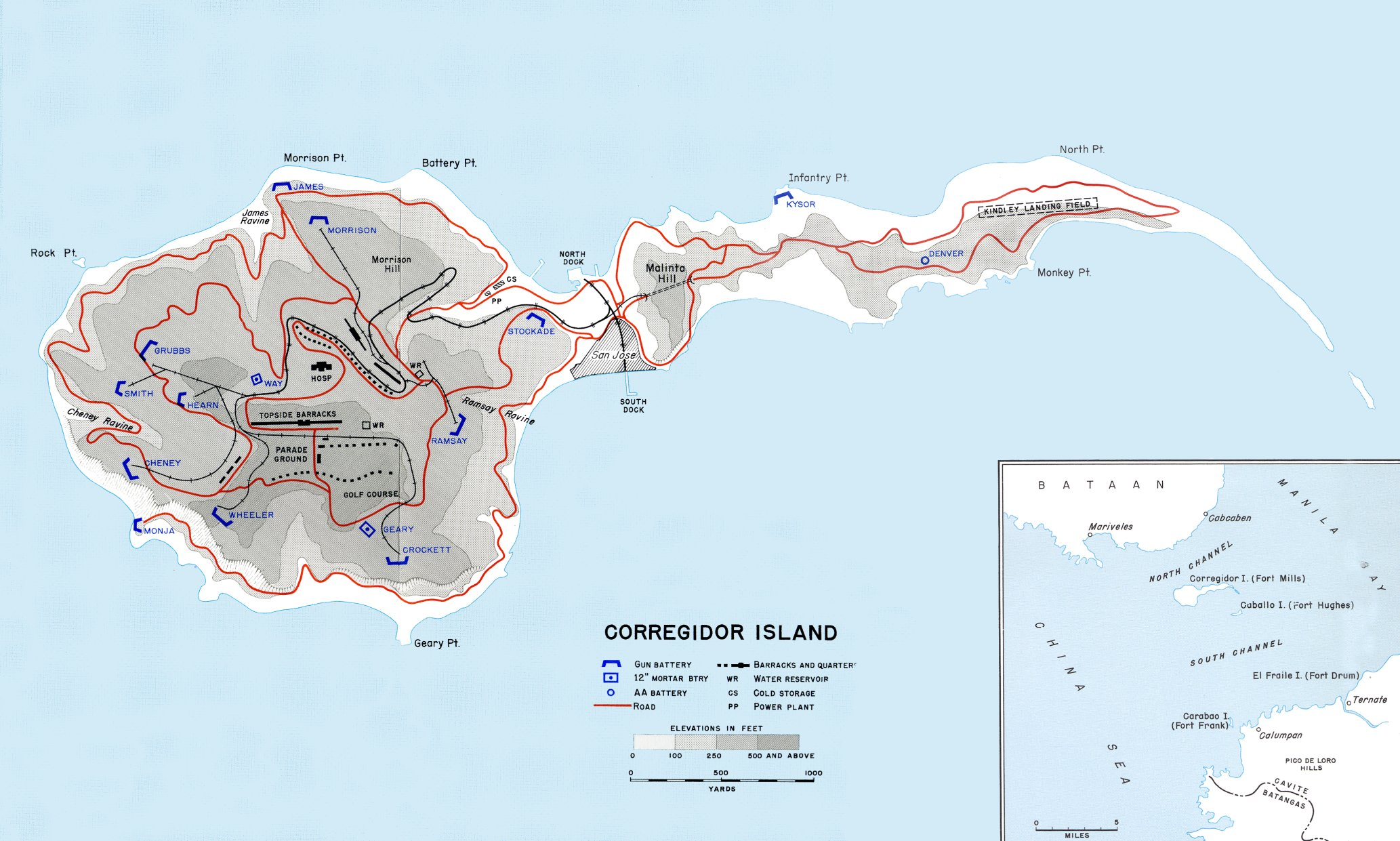
Map of Corregidor Island in 1941

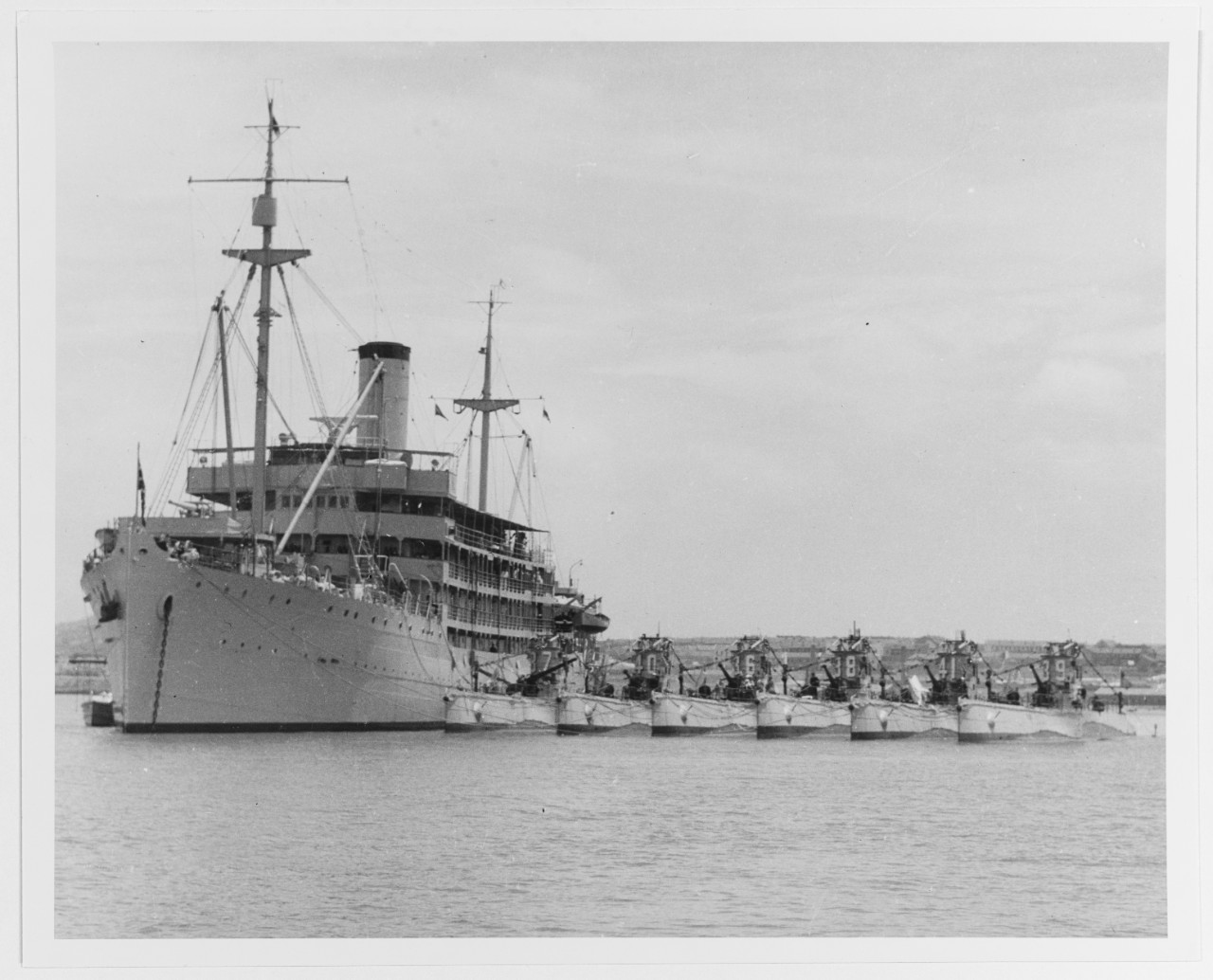
USS Canopus (AS-9) submarine tender in 1932 with S-37; S-40; S-36; S-38; S-41; S-39 at Cavite

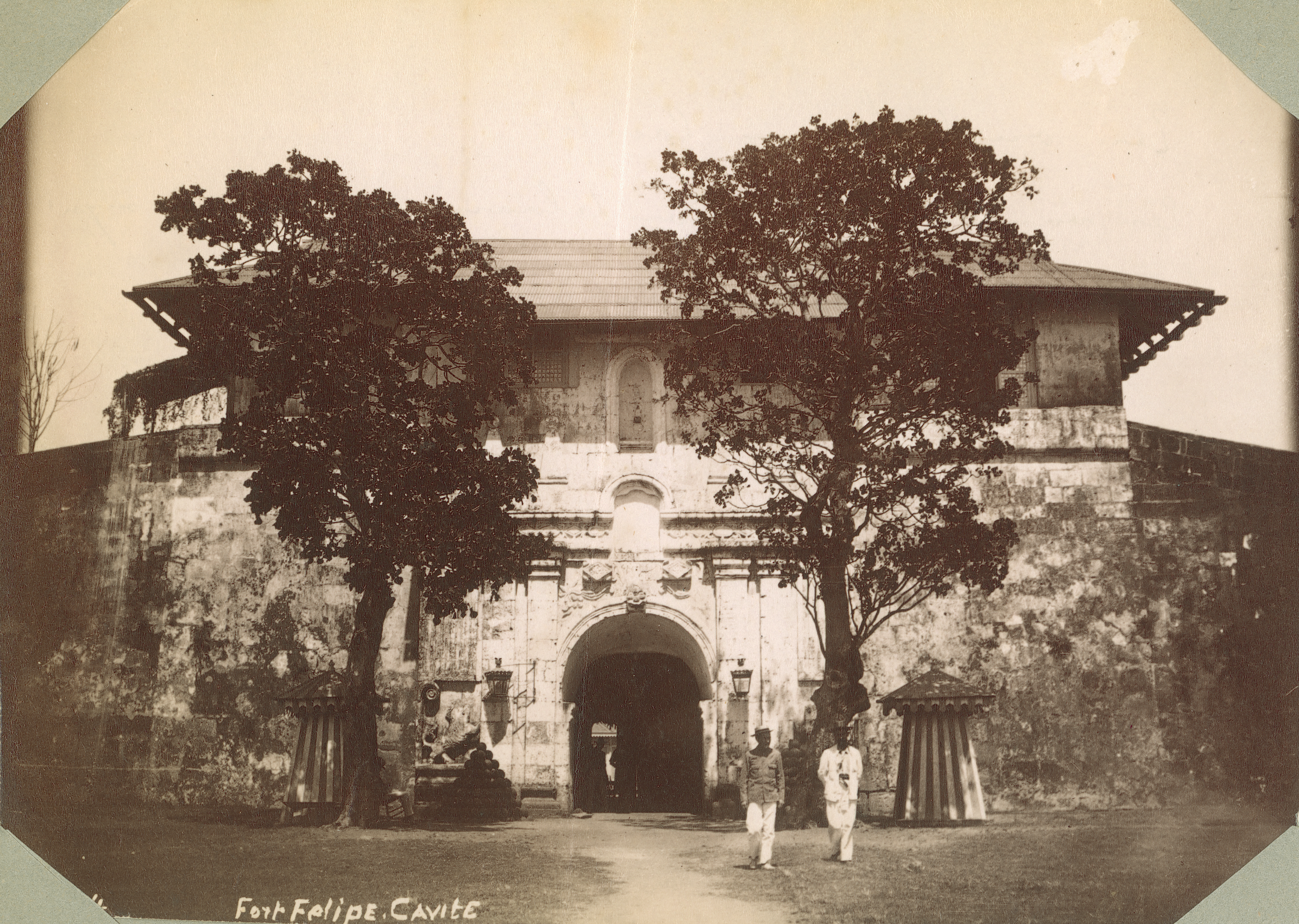
Fort San Felipe in Cavite in 1888 on Naval Base Cavite

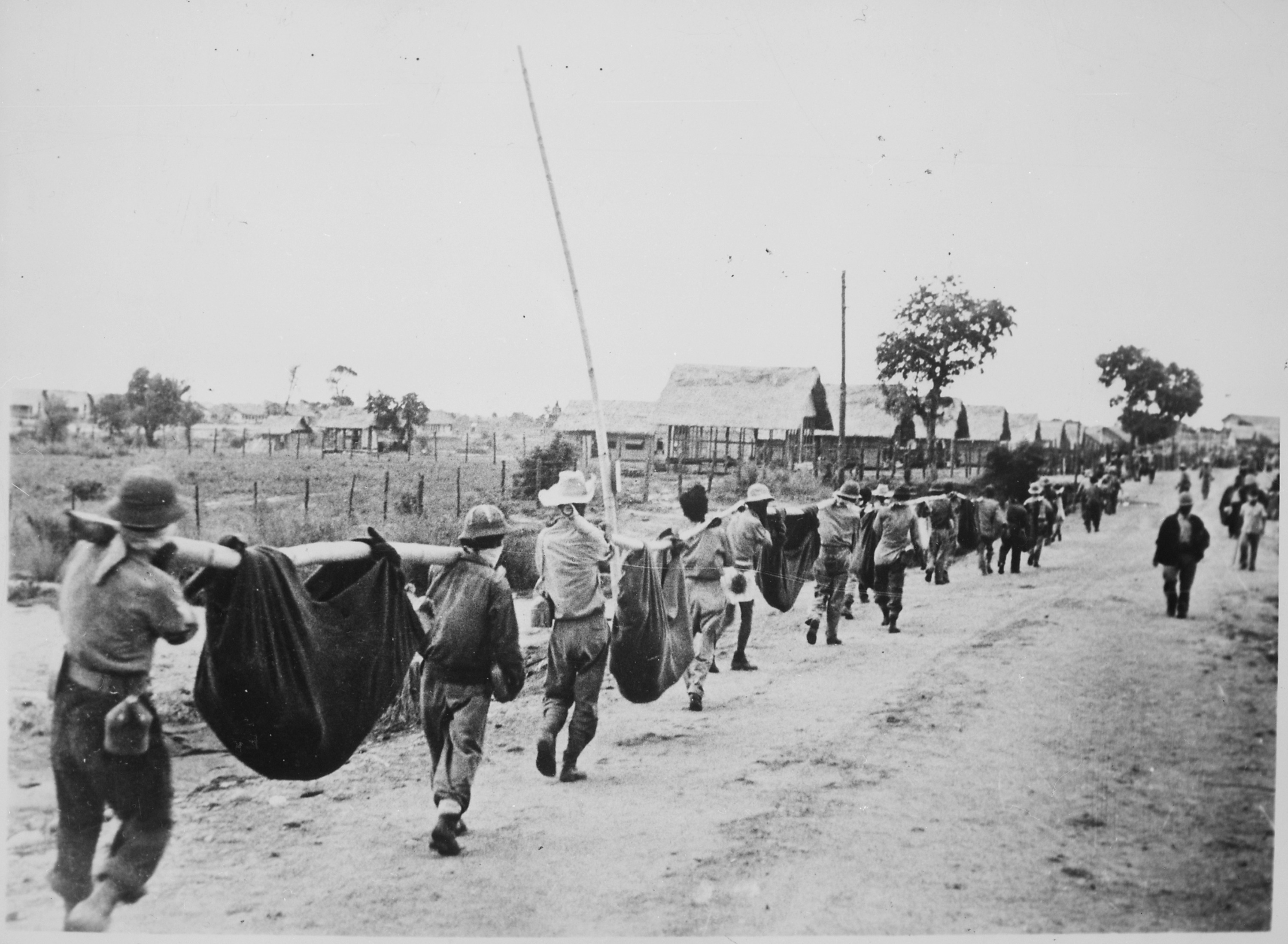
Bataan Death March that started at US Navy port at Mariveles on Bataan Peninsula on April 10, 1942, with US Army, Navy, Marines, Naval Hospital staff and Filipino Troops.

Map Bataan Death March route 1942

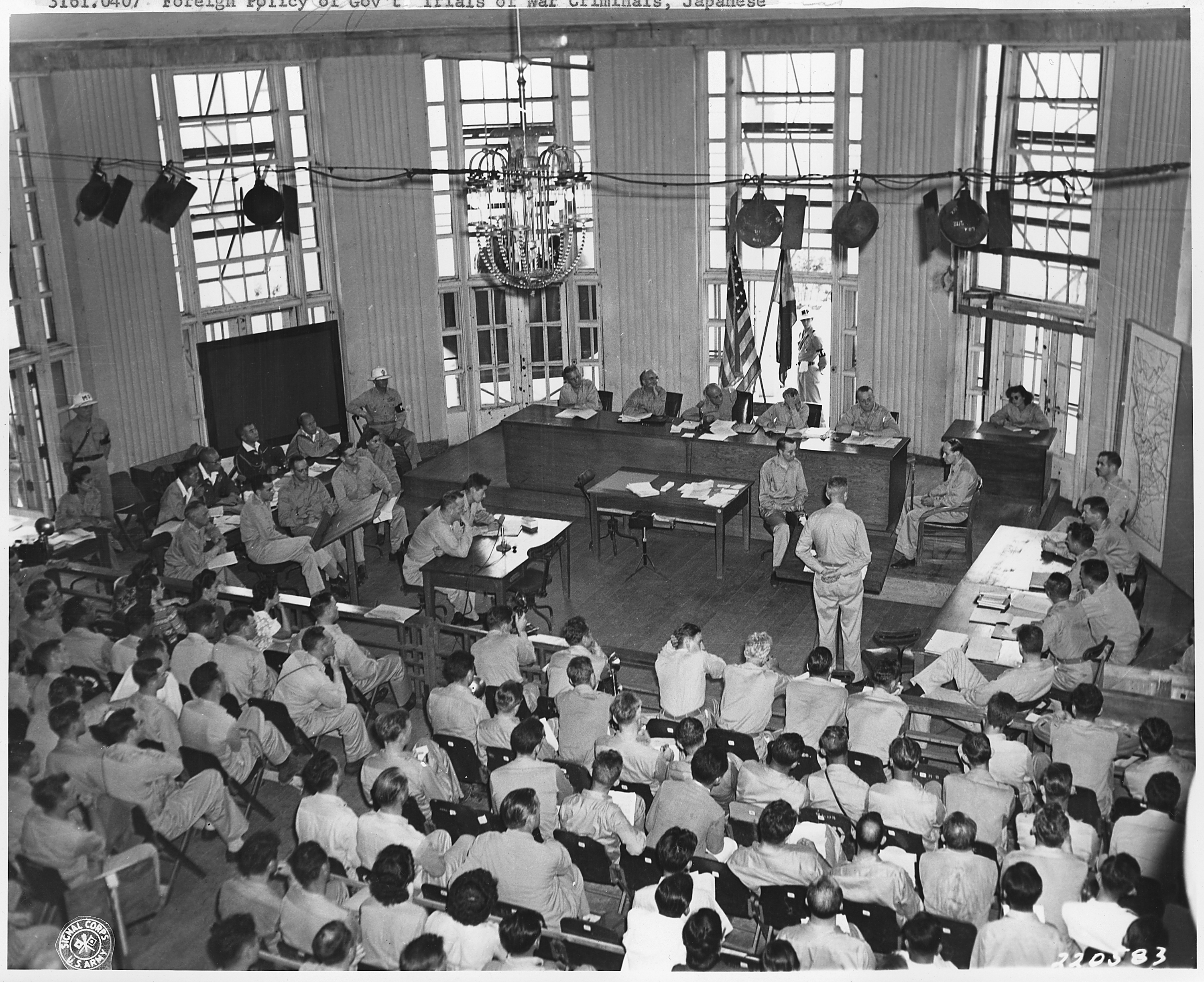
Japanese War Crimes Trials in Manila

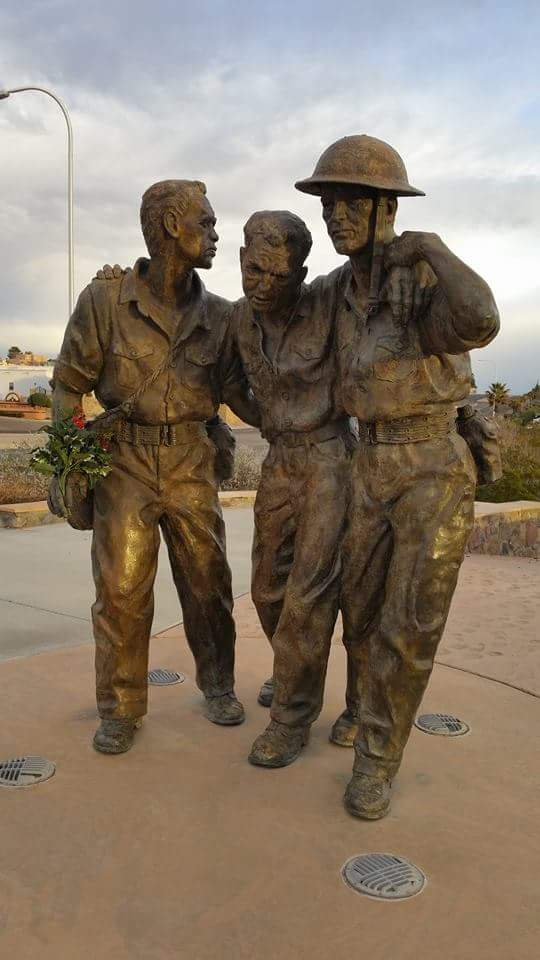
Bataan Death March Memorial Las Cruces, New Mexico

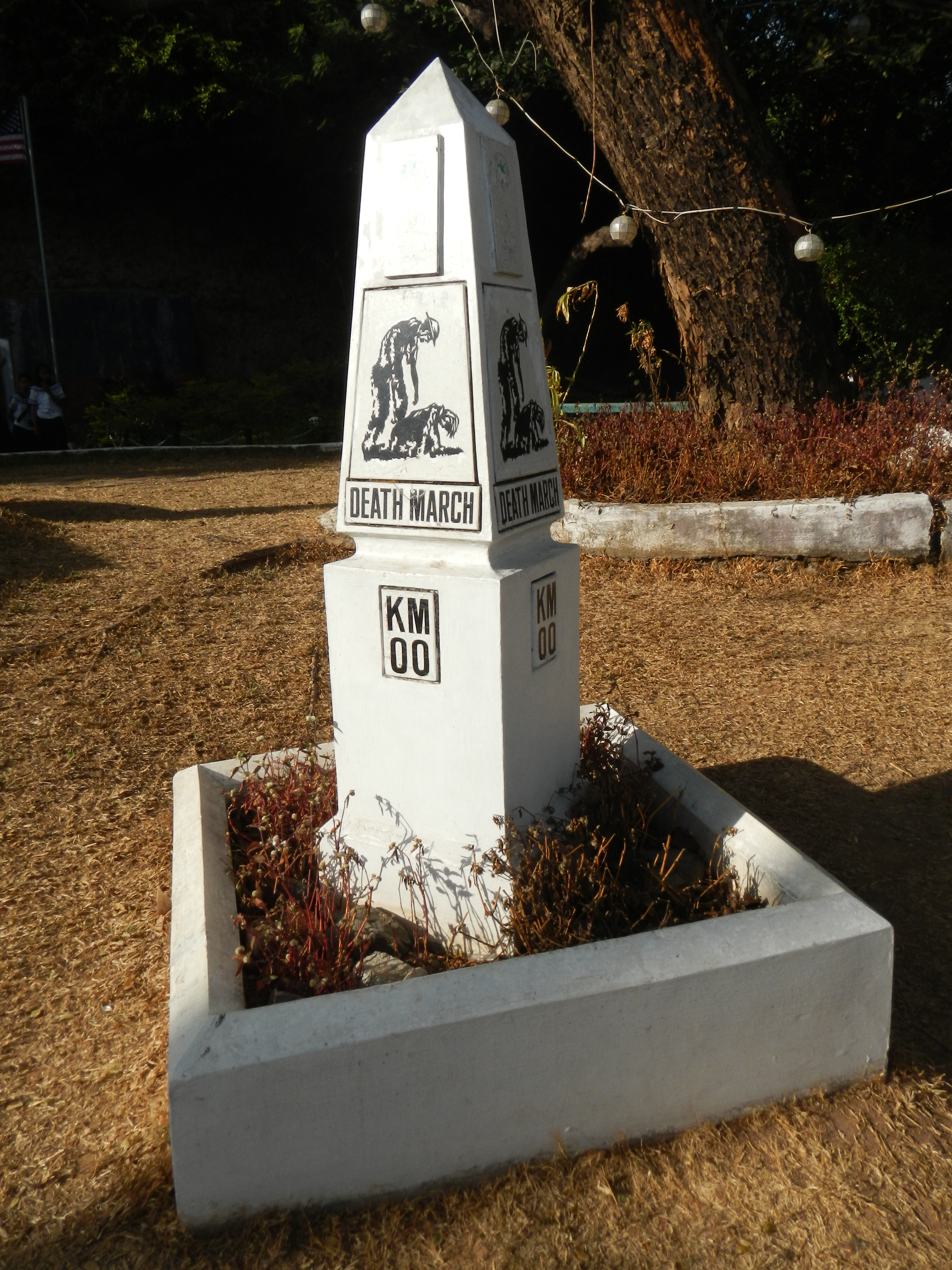
Zero Kilometer Death March Marker in Mariveles

== See also ==
- US Naval Base Philippines
- Naval Station San Miguel
- Fort Drum (Philippines)
- Camp Aguinaldo
- Camp Crame
- Cavite National High School
- Fort San Felipe (Cavite)
- USS Isabel
- Asiatic Squadron
- Women of Valor
- List of memorials to Bataan Death March victims
