= USS YP-97 =

History

United States
- Name: YP-97
- Builder: Engineering Equipment & Supply Company, Mandaluyong, Manila
- Launched: 1941
- Completed: 1941
- Acquired: acquired by U.S. Navy, 1941
- Stricken: 24 July 1942
- Home port: Manila, Philippines
- Honours and awards: 1 Battle Stars; American Defense Service Medal; Asiatic–Pacific Campaign Medal; World War II Victory Medal; Philippine Defense Medal
- Fate: March 1942, likely destroyed

General characteristics
- Type: Patrol boat
- Length: 65 ft 8 in (20.02 m) o/a
- Beam: 12 ft 6 in (3.81 m)
- Draught: 3 ft 6 in (1.07 m)
- Installed power: 590 horsepower
- Propulsion: Gasoline engine

YP-97 was a converted fishing vessel which served as an auxiliary patrol boat in the U.S. Navy during World War II.

== History ==
She was laid down in Mandaluyong, Manila by the Engineering Equipment & Supply Company. She was acquired on the stocks by the U.S. Navy for $35,000, launched in 1941, and designated as a Yard Patrol Craft (YP). She was assigned to the Asiatic Fleet, 16th Naval District where she served on the Base Section of the Inshore Patrol along with Maryann (flagship), Ranger (tugboat), Trabajador (tugboat), Fisheries II, and Perry. Her commanding officer was Ensign George K. Petritz. It is possible that YP-97 was also known by the name Perry.

In March 1942, she was lost during the Battle of Bataan. On 24 July 1942, she was struck from the Naval List.
