= Ranger (1940) =

US Navy tugboat

History

United States of America Commonwealth of the Philippines
- Name: Ranger
- Owner: Luzon Stevedoring Company Ltd.
- Builder: Hong Kong & Whampoa Dock Company Ltd.
- Launched: 1940
- Acquired: commandeered by the United States Navy, 10 December 1941
- Home port: Manila
- Fate: unknown

General characteristics
- Class & type: tugboat
- Tonnage: 545 long tons (554 t)
- Length: 130 feet 2 inches (39.67 m)
- Beam: 32 feet 1 inch (9.78 m)
- Draught: 11 feet 7 inches (3.53 m)
- Propulsion: oil-fueled, twin-screws, 229 nhp

Ranger was an ocean-going tugboat commandeered by the United States Navy during the Second World War.

== History ==
She was laid down at the Hong Kong and Whampoa Dock Company Ltd. for the Luzon Stevedoring Company Ltd. Inc of Manila.

She was in Hong Kong on 2 December 1941 when she was ordered to return to Manila with the Asiatic Fleet's Yangtze Patrol river gunboat USS Mindanao. She was loaded with 800 rounds of 3-inch shells and split 250,000 rounds of .30 caliber cartridges with Mindanao. The gunboat left in advance of her and was nearly lost to harsh seas. Ranger made Manila soon after Mindanao.

On 10 December 1941, the United States Navy commandeered Ranger, and assigned her to the Asiatic Fleet, 16th Naval District. She was assigned to the Inshore Patrol under Captain Kenneth M. Hoeffel. The Inshore Patrol was a rag-tag assemblage of vessels tasked with moving supplies and personnel and patrolling Manila Bay and the east coast of the besieged Bataan Peninsula. Other ships of the Inshore Patrol included three gunboats, three minesweepers, three Navy tugs, two commandeered tugs under US Navy control (Ranger, Trabajador), four converted yachts (Isabel, Maryann, Fisheries II, and Perry), and the submarine rescue vessel Pigeon. The Inshore Patrol was complemented by ships of the Offshore Patrol consisting of six US torpedo boats (PT-31, PT-32, PT-33, PT-34, PT-35, PT-41) and five Filipino-crewed boats consisting of 3 torpedo boats (Q-111 Luzon, Q-112 Abra, Q-113 Agusan), and two converted motor launches serving as gunboats (Q-114 Danday, Q-115 Baler), all serviced by the submarine tender Canopus.

On 30 December 1941, Ranger landed a raiding party at Naval Station Sangley Point to secure generators for the troops for Corregidor.

Ranger was abandoned and grounded just north of Fort Hughes, off Caballo Island. Her ultimate fate is uncertain. Naval records indicate that they lost record of her on 28 February 1942, although other sources indicate that she escaped Manila Bay on 6 May 1942.

== Awards ==
- Asiatic-Pacific Campaign Medal with one battle star
- World War II Victory Medal
- Philippine Presidential Unit Citation
- Philippine Defense Medal
