= Motor Torpedo Boat Squadron Three =

World War II Motor Torpedo Boat Squadron of US Navy

- Allegiance: United States
- Branch: United States Navy
- Operating Base: Naval Base Manila in Manila's Port Area
- Equipment: PT boats
- Engagements: Philippines campaign (1941–1942)

Commanders
- Commander: Lieutenant John D. Bulkeley

Insignia
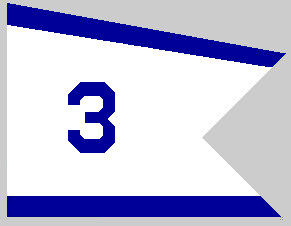
- Flagship Pennant of MTB Squadron 3

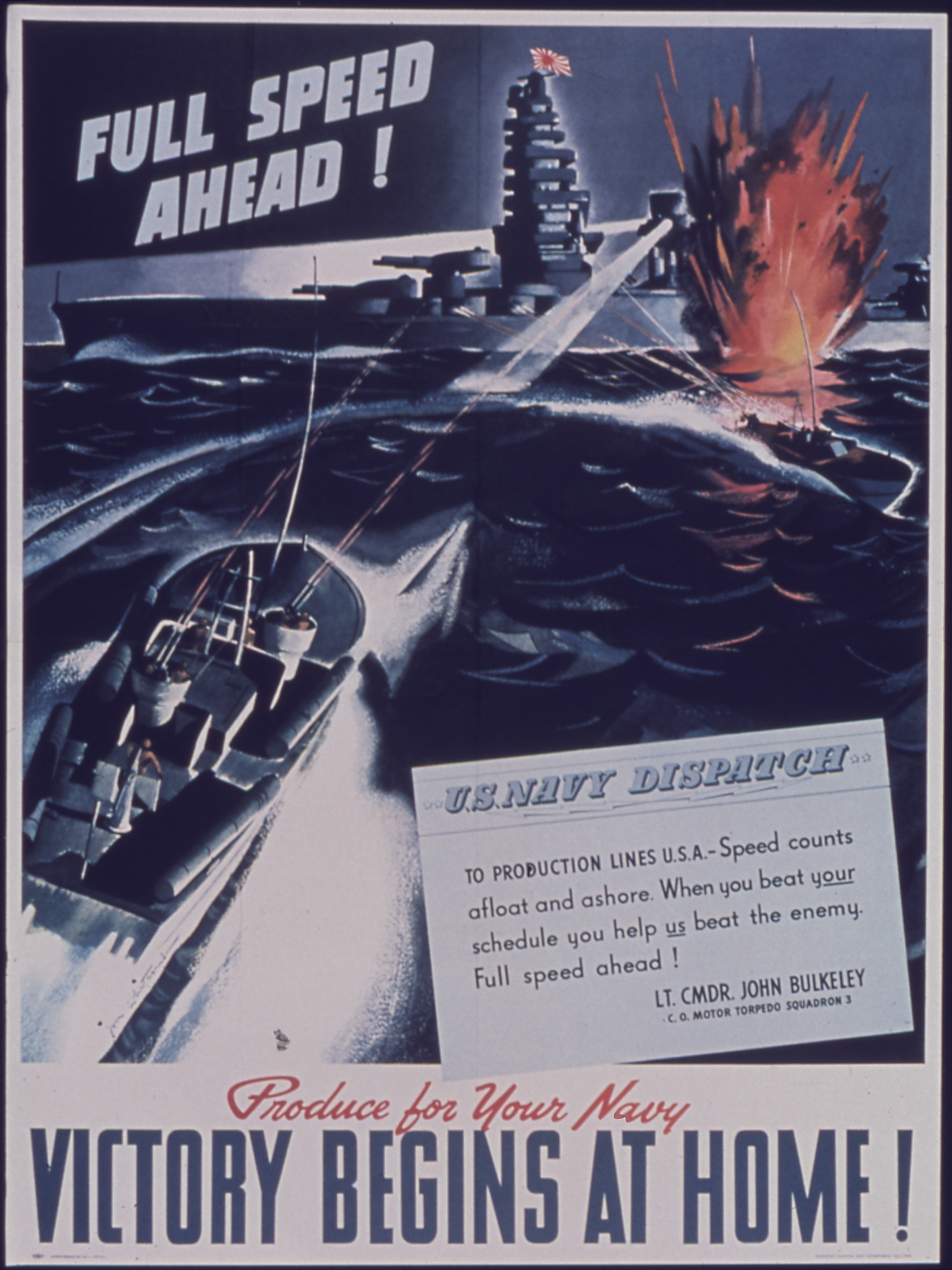
WWII poster with quote from John D. Bulkeley, Cd. Motor Torpedo Boat Squadron 3

Motor Torpedo Boat Squadron Three (MTBRon 3) was a United States Navy squadron based at Naval Base Cavite, Cavite, Philippines, from September 1941 to December 1941. It was commanded by Lieutenant John D. Bulkeley and made up of six motor torpedo boats: PT-31, PT-32, PT-33, PT-34, PT-35, and PT-41, the last as the squadron flagship. The other six boats of the squadron remained at Pearl Harbor, Hawaii, and were there when war broke out, eventually being shipped to the Solomons.

== History ==
After the outbreak of hostilities between the United States and Japan on 7 December 1941, the squadron moved from Cavite to Sisiman Bay (Note: "Sisiman Cove" in Naval references of the time, but now geographically known as "Sisiman Bay" just to the east of Mariveles.) on the Bataan Peninsula with the requisitioned tug Trabajador as tender, where it helped in the defense of Bataan and Corregidor during the Japanese invasion of the Philippines. PT-31 and PT-33 were sunk during the battle. The desired practice was for boats to patrol in pairs in the event one PT needed assistance from another. The critical shortage of spares and fuel often prevented such pairing so that one of the small converted patrol yachts, Maryann, Perry, or Fisheries II, or one of the two old destroyers, Peary or Pillsbury, were used to accompany a single PT on patrol.

On 11 March 1942, the remaining boats of the squadron transported General Douglas MacArthur and several high-ranking officers from Corregidor to Mindanao, an act which earned every member of the squadron the Silver Star. PT-32 was scuttled during this mission, reducing the squadron to three boats: PT-41, PT-34, and PT-35.

These three boats were based at Mindanao until mid-April 1942, where two of them (PT-41 and PT-34) attacked the Kuma, scoring at least one hit. This was to be the squadron's last action: PT-34 was destroyed by Japanese aircraft, PT-35 had to be scuttled to avoid capture, and PT-41 was commandeered by the U.S. Army to defend Lake Lanao. She was scuttled as well, three days after transfer.

Bulkeley and three other officers were later flown to safety on MacArthur's orders, with a fifth officer joining them shortly after. These five officers were all that remained of this squadron as a result. Three officers and fifteen enlisted men were killed in action or died as prisoners of war, seven evaded capture as guerrillas on Leyte, and 38 POWs were liberated after the war.

The squadron's exploits were immortalized in the book and film They Were Expendable. Bulkeley was awarded the Medal of Honor, the Distinguished Service Cross, the Philippine Distinguished Conduct Star, and the Silver Star during his command of the squadron, making him one of the most decorated U.S. naval officers of World War II.

On 27 July 1942 Motor Torpedo Boat Squadron Two was transferred to MTBRon 3 and was designated MTBRON 3(2). They were commanded by Lcdr. Alan R. Montgomery. In late 1942 the Squadron shipped for Tulagi with six 77' Elco boats and six 80' Elco boats. They were the first PTs in the Solomons. Their exploits in The Slot are historic. At the end of the Solomon's campaign MTBRon 3(2) was decommissioned. The Squadron was recommissioned in the Atlantic as MTBRON 2(2).

== List of assigned boats ==
- PT-31: commanded by LTJG E. G. DeLong. Grounded and scuttled at Subic Bay, Luzon, 20 January 1942.
- PT-32: commanded by LTJG V. E. Schumacher. Destroyed by USS Permit (SS-178) to prevent capture at Tagauayan Island, Visayas Region, 13 March 1942.
- PT-33: commanded by LTJG H. J. Brantingham. Grounded and scuttled at Subic Bay, 15 December 1941.
- PT-34: commanded by LT R. B. Kelly. Destroyed by air attack at Kawit Island, Mindanao, 9 April 1942.
- PT-35: commanded by ENS A. B. Akers. Burned to prevent capture at Cebu, Visayas Region, 12 April 1942.
- PT-41: commanded by LT J. D. Bulkeley. Squadron flagship. Burned to prevent capture near Lake Lanao, Mindanao, 15 April 1942.

== Bibliography ==
- White, William L. (1942). They Were Expendable. London: H. Hamilton. LCCN 43008243.
- Bulkley, Robert J. Jr. (2012). "The Fleet Withdraws". At Close Quarters: PT Boats in the United States Navy. Historical Studies. ISBN 9781622800049.
