= USS Lanikai =

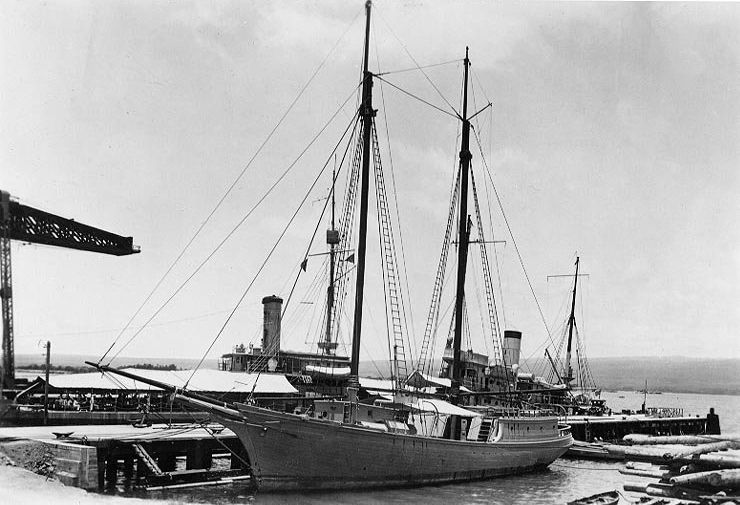

History

United States
- Name: USS Hermes
- Builder: W. F. Stone, Oakland, California
- Launched: 1914
- Acquired: by seizure, April 1917
- Commissioned: 1 April 1918
- Decommissioned: 16 January 1919
- Stricken: 1 July 1926
- Fate: Sold, 21 October 1926

United States
- Name: Lanikai
- Acquired: by charter, 5 December 1941
- Commissioned: 5 December 1941
- Honours and awards: 1 Battle Stars (World War II)
- Fate: Transferred to Royal Australian Navy, 22 August 1942

Australia
- Name: HMAS Lanikai
- Acquired: 22 August 1942
- Commissioned: 9 December 1942
- Decommissioned: 22 August 1945
- Fate: Returned to owner at Manila, 1946; Sank during a typhoon at Subic Bay, 1947

General characteristics as Hermes
- Type: Motor yacht
- Displacement: 340 long tons (345 t)
- Length: 89 ft 4 in (27.23 m)
- Beam: 25 ft 4 in (7.72 m)
- Draft: 7 ft 6 in (2.29 m)
- Complement: 26
- Armament: Unknown

General characteristics as Lanikai
- Displacement: 150 long tons (152 t)
- Length: 87 ft 3 in (26.59 m)
- Beam: 9 ft (2.7 m)
- Propulsion: Sails and diesel engine, 1 shaft
- Speed: 7 knots (13 km/h; 8.1 mph)
- Complement: 19
- Armament: 1 × 3-pounder 1.85 in (47 mm) QF rifle; 1 × .50 cal (12.7 mm). machine gun; 1 × .30 cal (7.62 mm) machine gun

Lanikai,was a wooden hulled schooner-rigged diesel powered yacht in service with the United States Navy during both World War I and World War II, before being transferred to the Royal Australian Navy.

The ship was built as MY Hermes by W. F. Stone of Oakland, California, in 1914, for the Williams-Diamond Company, agents for the trading company Jaluit-Gesellschaft of Hamburg, Germany.

== Service history ==
=== World War I, 1917–1919 ===
The German vessel was in port at Honolulu when the United States entered World War I in April 1917. Taken over by the Navy by Executive Order, she was commissioned at Honolulu as USS Hermes on 1 April 1918.

Originally intended as a submarine patrol vessel, Hermes performed this duty out of Honolulu during the summer of 1918. On 31 August she sailed on a cruise among the islands northwest of Hawaii, including Laysan and Wake, to search for survivors of shipwrecks, signs of enemy activity, and to conduct a survey on wildlife and particularly birds for the Biological Survey Commission, Washington. After returning to Pearl Harbor on 2 October, she continued as a patrol craft.

=== Inter-war activities, 1919–1941 ===
Hermes was ordered decommissioned on 16 January 1919 and placed at the disposal of the Hawaiian territorial government for use as a tender to leper colonies. When the territorial government decided they could not afford her upkeep, Hermes was turned over to the Pacific Air Detachment, whom she served as a store ship and general auxiliary craft.

Hermes was sold on 21 October 1926 to the Lanikai Fish Company and renamed Lanikai, and sold again in 1929 to the Hawaiian Sea Products Company. Laid up in 1931, the yacht was sold in 1933 to Northrup Castle of Honolulu, and sold in 1936 to Harry W. Crosby of Seattle, Washington. In 1937 she was sold to Metro-Goldwyn-Mayer studios for use in making the film The Hurricane, starring Jon Hall and Dorothy Lamour. Following completion of the film she was used as the MGM yacht until sold on 6 April 1939 to E. M. Grimm of the Luzon Stevedoring Company of Manila, Philippines.

=== World War II ===
==== Operations in the Philippines, 1941–1942 ====
Lanikai was acquired by the United States Navy at Cavite Navy Yard, Philippine Islands, under charter from Luzon Stevedoring Co., on 5 December 1941, with Lieutenant (later Rear Admiral) Kemp Tolley in command. She was never officially commissioned in the U.S. Navy thus the prefix "USS" should not be used in references to her.

Late in November 1941 it became apparent to the American Government that Japanese forces were tactically deposed for major operations in Southeast Asia, but their precise target was unknown. A large convoy was steaming south from the Formosa Straits, and it was hoped that learning the destination of these ships might reveal Japan's intentions.

On 2 December, President Roosevelt ordered, through Chief of Naval Operations, Admiral Harold R. Stark, that the Commander in Chief, Asiatic Fleet, Admiral Thomas C. Hart "charter three small vessels to form a defensive information patrol... to observe and report by radio Japanese movements in the west China Sea and Gulf of Siam."

Lanikai was one of a few small ships (along with Fisheries II and Maryanne), chartered to learn of Japan's intentions. Fitted out at Cavite, with the greatest dispatch, the schooner lay at the entrance of Manila Bay in the early hours of 8 December (7 December east of the International Date Line) awaiting daylight to thread her way through the dangerous minefields which guarded the harbor. Tolley's orders read: "Patrol off the entrance of Cam Ranh Bay and report the direction taken by the Japanese Fleet when it emerges." However, at 0300 word of Japan's attack on Pearl Harbor arrived with orders to return to Manila.

In ensuing weeks, the schooner patrolled the approaches to Manila Bay and served as dispatch vessel within the harbor. On 10 December she survived the devastating Japanese air raid which destroyed Cavite Navy Yard. On Christmas Day, she assisted in the evacuation of Manila, carrying Army officers and equipment to Corregidor.

==== Escape to Australia, 1941–1942 ====
As a result of plans and actions of Lt. Comdr. Charles Adair, flag lieutenant to Admiral Hart, approval was obtained for Lanikai to attempt to escape to the Netherlands East Indies. On the evening of 26 December, carrying as passengers one Dutch and three American officers, Lanikai, with her Filipino crew, got underway from Mariveles Bay, Luzon, "destination unknown". Heading generally south, hiding in friendly coves during daylight, and traveling principally at night, the schooner sailed from island to island as Japanese forces spread across the East Indies with explosive speed. Storms covered her as she crossed the three large stretches of open water which lay between Luzon and Australia, and offered no coves for daylight concealment. When, as happened all too often, enemy aircraft approached the lightly armed schooner, they were preoccupied for the most part, with bigger game; but, at Surabaya, Java, on 3 February 1942, three Japanese bombs straddled the schooner so close aboard that Lanikai crewmen put off in a skiff to pick up a large quantity of stunned fish.

In late February, under full sail despite heavy seas, Lanikai headed due south from Tjilatjap, Java. This course was taken to avoid enemy forces which might be searching the direct route from Java to Darwin, Northern Territory. On 1 March, while about 200 miles east of Christmas Island, a large Japanese task force was sighted on the port bow. Evasive action by Lanikai was successful. On 18 March, 82 days after departing Mariveles, the schooner arrived at Fremantle, Western Australia.

==== Service in Australia, 1942–1945 ====
After replenishment and repairs, she got underway, on 4 April, to cruise along the northwest Australian coast and search for possible Japanese coast watchers. Lt. Comdr. Adair relieved Lt Comdr. Tolley of command of the vessel on 27 April and continued the search into mid-May. Lanikai was decommissioned at Fremantle on 22 August 1942 and was transferred to the Royal Australian Navy in which she served on harbor defense throughout the war.

=== Fate, 1945–1947 ===
At the end of the war, Lanikai was sent back to the Philippines, and returned to her previous owner at Manila in 1946, but the owner refused to accept her in such poor condition. While undergoing repair at Subic Bay, the US naval base north of Manila, Lanikai sank during a typhoon in 1947. In 2003 the wreck of the vessel was found in Subic Bay just off Nabasan Wharf and artifacts later salvaged.

== Awards ==
- World War I Victory Medal
- American Defense Service Medal with "FLEET" clasp
- Asiatic-Pacific Campaign Medal with one battle star
- World War II Victory Medal
- Philippine Presidential Unit Citation
- Philippine Defense Medal (Philippines)
- 1939–45 Star (United Kingdom)
- Pacific Star (United Kingdom)
- War Medal 1939–1945 (United Kingdom)

== See also ==
- Fisheries II
- Maryann (yacht)
