= Fisheries II =

US Navy vessel

History
- Name: Fisheries II
- Acquired: 8 December 1941
- Out of service: 6 May 1942
- Honours and awards: one battle star
- Fate: Scuttled to prevent capture.

Fisheries II (a.k.a. "Fisheries Two") was a vessel requisitioned by the United States Navy during the defense of the Philippines during World War II. The vessel was "in service" and not commissioned.

== World War II service ==
Fisheries II was in service from 8 December 1941 until she was scuttled at Corregidor on 6 May 1942 to prevent her capture by the Japanese. The vessel was apparently never formally commissioned as a United States Ship (U.S.S.) nor given an official designation but is shown in U.S. Navy and Coast Guard Vessels, Sunk or Damaged Beyond Repair during World War II, 7 December 1941 – 1 October 1945 under "Converted Patrol Vessels" along with Maryann and the converted patrol vessel, Perry. After 13 December 1941 Fisheries II was assigned to the Base Section of the Inshore Patrol of the United States Asiatic Fleet. Fisheries II was commanded by Chief Boatswain James Charles Oster.

After destruction of facilities at Cavite Navy Yard on 10 December 1941 Fisheries II moved with Motor Torpedo Boat Squadron Three to Sisiman Bay (Note: "Sisiman Cove" in U.S. Naval references of the time, but now geographically known as "Sisiman Bay" just to the east of Mariveles. 14.425485°N 120.526927°E) on the Bataan Peninsula where the commandeered tug Trabajador served as tender to the squadron. Despite the need to patrol in pairs in the event one PT needed assistance from another the critical shortage of spares and fuel often prevented such pairing so that one of the small converted patrol yachts, Maryann, Perry, or Fisheries II was used to accompany the PT. On 10 March the last PT boats departed south with General MacArthur with increased Japanese naval activity in the vicinity of the entrances to Manila Bay.

She was officially credited with one battle star for her participation in the defense of the Philippines.

== Navy Cross awards ==
Two officers assigned to Fisheries II were awarded the Navy Cross.

Citation for award of the Navy Cross to Ensign George K. Petritz

The President of the United States of America takes pleasure in presenting the Navy Cross to Ensign George Karl Petritz (NSN: 0-97128), United States Naval Reserve, for extraordinary heroism in combat with the enemy during the periods 7 December 1941 to 7 March 1942, while on board the U.S.S. FISHERIES TWO, in the Philippine Islands. While exposed to frequent horizontal and dive bombing attacks by enemy Japanese air forces, Ensign Petritz directed the fire of his anti-aircraft battery and participated in operations of strategic importance in the Manila Bay area involving hazardous missions such as to reflect great credit upon himself and the United States Naval Service. General Orders: Commandant, 16th Naval District: Dispatch 281200-NCR 7859 (29 April 1942) Action Date: 7 December 1941 – 28 April 1942

Citation for award of the Navy Cross to Ensign Lowell Hall Strand

The President of the United States of America takes pleasure in presenting the Navy Cross to Ensign Lowell Hall Strand, United States Naval Reserve, for extraordinary heroism and devotion to duty in action against the enemy while serving at FISHERIES TWO in the Philippine Islands, in combat against the enemy, directing and operating anti-aircraft from his vessel while exposed to frequent attacks from the enemy and dive bombers during the period from 7 March 1942 to 19 April 1942. His conduct throughout was in keeping with the highest traditions of the Navy of the United States. General Orders: Commander 16th Naval District: Desp. 281200 (29 April 1942) Action Date: 7 March – 19 April 1942

== Awards ==
- Asiatic-Pacific Campaign Medal with one battle star
- World War II Victory Medal
- Philippine Defense Medal

== See also ==
- USS Lanikai
- USS YP-97 (1941)
- Maryann
