= Maryann (yacht) =

Maryann, sometimes seen as Maryanne or Mary Anne, was a yacht requisitioned and converted by the United States Navy during the defense of the Philippines in World War II and destroyed 5 May 1942 at Corregidor to prevent capture. The yacht was "in service" and not commissioned.

== World War II service ==
Maryann was in service from 8 December 1941 until she was scuttled at Corregidor on 6 May 1942 to prevent her capture by the Japanese. She was, apparently, never formally commissioned as a United States Ship (U.S.S.) nor given an official designation but is shown in U.S. Navy and Coast Guard Vessels, Sunk or Damaged Beyond Repair during World War II, 7 December 1941 – 1 October 1945 under "Converted Patrol Vessels" along with Fisheries II and another converted yacht, named Perry, without the U.S.S. designation nor a hull number.

On 13 December 1941, Maryann was assigned to the Base Section of the Inshore Patrol of the United States Asiatic Fleet. Maryann was first commanded by Ensign Fred Rising Newell Jr., USNR.

During 4 January – 29 April 1942 she was commanded by Lieutenant Fred Luman Raymond. Raymond, along with Lieutenant (junior grade) Newell, later received the Navy Cross for heroism during the defense of the Philippines. Raymond was taken prisoner by the Japanese and died on or about 15 December 1944. Newell was also taken prisoner and also died in captivity, on 22 January 1945.

After destruction of facilities at Cavite Navy Yard on 10 December 1941, Maryann moved with Motor Torpedo Boat Squadron Three to Sisiman Bay (Note: Sometimes "Sisiman Cove" in U.S. Naval references of the time, but geographically known as "Sisiman Bay" just to the east of Mariveles.) on the Bataan Peninsula where the commandeered tug Trabajador served as tender to the squadron. Despite the need to patrol in pairs in the event one PT needed assistance from another, the critical shortage of spares and fuel often prevented such pairing such that one of the small converted patrol yachts—Maryann, Perry, or Fisheries II—was used to accompany the PT. On the night of 1 February, the converted yacht was in company with PT-32 which was damaged "with her hull held together by a jury rig of wires and braces" and capable of only 22 knots (25 mph; 41 km/h) on a patrol off Bataan during which the PT made an attack on a large ship thought to be a cruiser. On 10 March, the last PT boats departed south with General MacArthur with increased Japanese naval activity in the vicinity of the entrances to Manila Bay.

Along with a number of other U.S. Navy vessels, Maryann was destroyed to prevent capture when the Japanese landed on Corregidor in May 1942. She was officially credited with one battle star for her participation in the defense of the Philippines.

== Navy Cross awards to crewmembers ==
Two officers assigned to Maryanne were awarded the Navy Cross. Both officers were captured with the fall of the Philippines and died while prisoners of war.

Citation for the Navy Cross awarded to Lieutenant (Junior Grade) Fred Rising Newell Jr.

The President of the United States of America takes pleasure in presenting the Navy Cross to Lieutenant, Junior Grade Fred Rising Newell, Jr., United States Naval Reserve, for heroism during combat with the enemy during the period 7 December 1941 to 7 March 1942, and 19–28 April 1942, while on board the U.S.S. MARYANNE, in the Philippine Islands. While exposed to frequent horizontal and dive bombing attacks by enemy Japanese air forces, Lieutenant, Junior Grade, Newell directed the fire of his anti-aircraft battery and participated in operations of strategic importance in the Manila Bay area involving hazardous missions such as to reflect great credit upon the United States Naval Service. Action Date: December 7, 1941 – April 28, 1942

Citation for the Navy Cross awarded to Lieutenant Fred Luman Raymond

The President of the United States of America takes pride in presenting the Navy Cross to Lieutenant Fred Luman Raymond, United States Naval Reserve, for extraordinary heroism in combat while serving on board the U.S.S. MARYANNE of the Inshore Patrol, Philippine Islands, during the period from 4 January to 29 April 1942, in organizing, administering and directing forces while exposed to the same hazards as vessels mentioned above. Most of these officers, with their crews, were engaged from 12 April 1942 in missions of major strategic importance and of most hazardous nature involving night sweeping of safe passage through contact mine fields south of Corregidor and distant night patrols for intercepting enemy landing parties. Lieutenant Raymond's conduct throughout this period was in keeping with the highest traditions of the United States Naval Service.

General Orders: Commandant 16th Naval District: Desp. 281200 NCR 7859 (April 29, 1942)

Action Date: January 4 – April 29, 1942

== Awards ==
- Asiatic-Pacific Campaign Medal with one battle star
- World War II Victory Medal
- Philippine Defense Medal

== See also ==
- USS Lanikai
- List of shipwrecks in May 1942
- List of United States Navy losses in World War II
