= Trabajador (1931) =

History
- Name: Trabajador
- Owner: Visayan Stevedore-Transportation Co.
- Port of registry: Iloilo, Philippines (United States registry)
- Builder: Hong Kong and Whampoa Dock Co., Ltd., Hong Kong
- Launched: 1931
- Identification: ON 181513
- Honours and awards: One battle star
- Fate: Sunk 10 April 1942
- Notes: Commandeered by United States Navy and assigned to the 16th Naval District on 13 December 1941.

General characteristics
- Type: Tug
- Tonnage: 249 GRT
- Length: 111 feet 0 inches (33.8 m)
- Beam: 26 feet 1 inch (8.0 m)
- Draft: 10 feet 6 inches (3.2 m)
- Decks: 1
- Installed power: 131 NHP
- Propulsion: 6 cyl. Diesel, Union Diesel Engineering Co., Oakland, California

Trabajador was a 111-foot (34 m) tug launched in 1931 from the Hong Kong and Whampoa Dock for Visayan Stevedore-Transportation Company and registered as a United States vessel in Iloilo, Philippines.

== Commercial service ==
In 1935 the Trabajador took part in a rescue of survivors from the British freighter Silver Hazel that was wrecked in San Bernardino Strait. Of 54 passengers and crew, 52 were rescued. (Note: U.S. destroyers USS Bulmer and USS Peary are also mentioned in the news article. In another article, the coastwise Philippine vessel Governor Taft and Japanese Chicago (Chicago Maru (1910)) are mentioned.)

== United States Navy service ==
The tug was commandeered by United States Navy and assigned to the 16th Naval District on 13 December 1941 under command of Lt. (jg.) Trose E. Donaldson, USNR as the war came to the Philippines. Although not formally commissioned by the U.S. Navy, she served as a patrol boat tender in Manila Bay with the Base Section of the Navy's Inshore Patrol.

Trabajador, assisted by the USS Finch, dumped unused mines into Manila Bay as Corregidor came under air attack on 29 December 1941 and continued the operation through the next day. With the move of Motor Torpedo Boat Squadron Three to Sisiman Bay (Note: "Sisiman Cove" in U.S. Naval references of the time, but now geographically known as "Sisiman Bay" just to the east of Mariveles. 14.425485°N 120.526927°E) on the Bataan Peninsula the tug became tender to the PT boat squadron. For a brief time she was the "luxury" vessel for the PTs with a real galley, wardroom and a mess boy who baked pies. After the squadron had left with General MacArthur as a passenger thirty-two men were left behind including Lt. (jg.) Edward G. DeLong who assumed command of Trabajador on 25 February 1942. DeLong left Corregidor on 2 May and made it to Mindanao where he was later captured and executed in prison camp.

Trabajador was sunk on 10 April 1942, most likely by Japanese artillery near Corregidor, and was awarded a battle star.

== Resolute ==
The tug remained on the bottom of Manila Bay until after the end of World War II. When she was salvaged she was renamed Resolute and continued operations in the Philippines into the late 1970s.

== Sources ==
- Cressman, Robert J. (1999). "The Official Chronology of the U.S. Navy in World War II". Contemporary History Branch, Naval Historical Center (now Naval History & Heritage Command).
- "Destroyers Save Survivors of Boat Wreck". Daily Trojan. 27 (37). 13 November 1945.
- Naval History And Heritage Command. "Trabajador". Dictionary of American Naval Fighting Ships. Naval History And Heritage Command.
- Lloyds. "Lloyd's Register 1933–34" (PDF). Lloyd's Register (through PlimsollShipData).
- Smith, George W. (2005). MacArthur's Escape: John "Wild Man" Bulkeley and the Rescue of an American Hero. St Paul, MN: Zenith Press. LCCN 2005298302.
- White, William L. (1942). They Were Expendable. London: H. Hamilton. LCCN 43008243.
