= Kemp Tolley =

American naval officer and historian

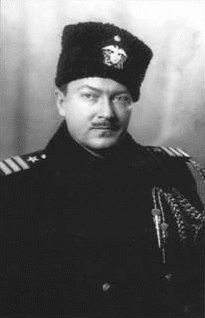
- Born: Kemp Tolley; 29 April 1908; Manila, Philippines
- Died: 28 October 2000 (aged 92); Corbett, Maryland
- Military career
- Allegiance: United States of America
- Branch: United States Navy
- Service years: 1925–1959
- Rank: Rear Admiral
- Conflicts: World War II; Korean War

Rear Admiral Kemp Tolley (29 April 1908 – 28 October 2000) was an officer in the U.S. Navy and is the author of three books and numerous articles on the history of U.S. Navy activities in the Pacific, China, and the Soviet Union.

== Early life ==
Admiral Tolley was born in Manila in, while his father, Lieutenant Colonel Oscar Kemp Tolley, was serving there in the U.S. Army, Kemp Tolley was a 1929 graduate of the United States Naval Academy at Annapolis, where he was a member of Phi Alpha Theta.

== Early career ==
During the 1930s, Tolley served aboard battleships, cruisers and a submarine tender. He also served on the exotic China station, becoming executive officer of the river gunboat USS Tutuila on the upper Yangtze River.

Tolley had a natural aptitude for languages and was fluent in Russian, German, French and Spanish.

== World War II ==
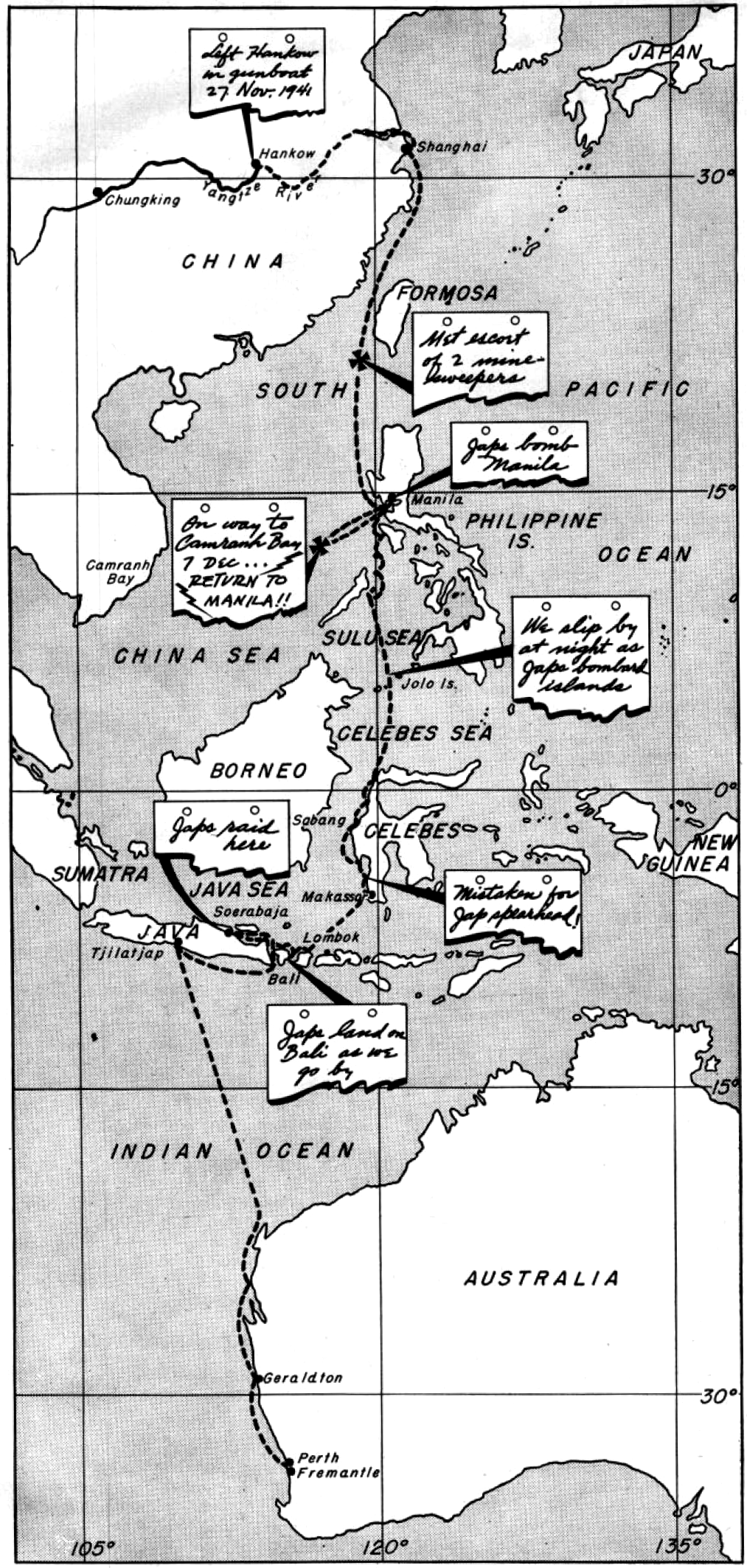
Lt. Kemp Tolley's escape route to Australia in 1941–1942.

Tolley, then a lieutenant, left Hankou, China on 27 November 1941 aboard USS Wake (PR-3). The gunboat sailed down the Yangtze River to Shanghai, where Tolley boarded USS Oahu (PR-6), bound for Manila, Philippines.

On 5 December 1941 Tolley was given command of the sailing schooner Lanikai, which had been acquired by the Navy from a private owner, and given orders to sail in waters off the Philippines and report any sightings of Japanese warships. The Japanese attacked Pearl Harbor before Tolley could embark on this mission and the Lanikai was assigned to the Inshore Patrol.

Lanikai was detached on 26 December 1941 and ordered to attempt to escape to friendly waters. This was the start of a two-month odyssey during which Lanikai sailed from Manila in the Philippine Islands, to Surabaya on Java in the then Netherlands East Indies. Lanikai participated briefly in the doomed defense of Java and was strafed by Japanese aircraft on at least one occasion. Just prior to the fall of Java, Tolley took Lanikai to Tjilatjap on the south coast of Java where she evacuated allied stragglers. Lanikai departed Java 26 February 1942 just prior to the Dutch surrender and arrived at Fremantle, Australia on 18 March 1942. After suitable recovery and refitting Lanikai was engaged in patrol work along the northern coast of Western Australia until April 27, 1942.

In August 1942, the Lanikai was turned over to the Royal Australian Navy. Tolley was then reassigned as an assistant naval attaché in the Soviet Union. There, he met Vlada Gritzenko, whom he married in 1943. He served in this assignment until 1944 and was promoted to lieutenant commander and commander.

Late in 1944, Tolley returned to the Pacific when he was assigned as the navigator of the battleship USS North Carolina where he participated in combat action at Leyte Gulf and off Luzon during the liberation of the Philippines. He was also aboard North Carolina during the invasion of Iwo Jima and was wounded by shell fragments at Okinawa Gunto.

For his service during the war, Tolley received the Bronze Star Medal for meritorious service, the Purple Heart for being wounded in action and seven battle stars.

== Post War Career ==
After the war, he became an intelligence officer on the Naval Operations staff and commanded the attack cargo ship USS Vermilion (AKA-107) from June 1947 to September 1948.

From 1949 to 1952, he was the director of the intelligence division at the Armed Forces Staff College in Norfolk, Virginia, where his unorthodox teaching methods were frowned upon by his superiors although his classes were very popular with his students.

Other tours included operations officer on the staff of Commander Amphibious Group Two and command of Amphibious Squadron Five, during which time he was tasked with forming an evacuation plan for Taiwan. In 1956, he was designated commander of fleet activities at the Yokosuka, Japan.

== Later life ==
Tolley retired from the Navy in 1959, and was promoted to rear admiral on the retired list in recognition of his being decorated for combat service. He then returned to his boyhood home in historic Corbett Village, Monkton, Maryland.

In retirement, he wrote more than 100 articles and three books, "Yangtze Patrol," "Cruise of the Lanikai" and "Caviar and Commissars."

In 1992, he was inducted into the Defense Attache Hall of Fame in Washington.

In 1993, he was honored at the White House Rose Garden by President Bill Clinton and later by Russian president Boris N. Yeltsin.

Tolley died at his home in Corbett, Maryland on October 28, 2000, at the age of 92.

A bronze bust of Admiral Tolley was erected at the United States Naval Academy in his honor.

== Awards ==
- Bronze Star Medal
- Navy Commendation Medal
- Purple Heart
- Yangtze Service Medal
- China Service Medal
- American Defense Service Medal with "FLEET" clasp
- Asiatic-Pacific Campaign Medal with one silver and two bronze battle stars
- European-African-Middle Eastern Campaign Medal
- World War II Victory Medal
- Navy Occupation Medal with "ASIA" clasp
- National Defense Service Medal
- Navy Expert Rifleman Medal
- Navy Expert Pistol Shot Medal
- Philippine Presidential Unit Citation
- Philippine Defense Medal with star
- Philippine Liberation Medal with star
- Philippine Independence Medal

== Dates of rank ==
- Midshipman - 16 June 1925
- Ensign - 6 June 1929
- Lieutenant (junior grade) - 6 June 1932
- Lieutenant - 30 June 1937
- Lieutenant Commander - 30 June 1942
- Commander (temporary) - 1 October 1942
- Captain (temporary) - 30 March 1945
- Rear Admiral (Retired List) - 1959

== Books ==
- Yangtze Patrol
- Cruise of the Lanikai: Incitement to War
- Caviar and Commissars: The Experiences of a U.S. Naval Officer in Stalin's Russia
