= United States Asiatic Fleet =

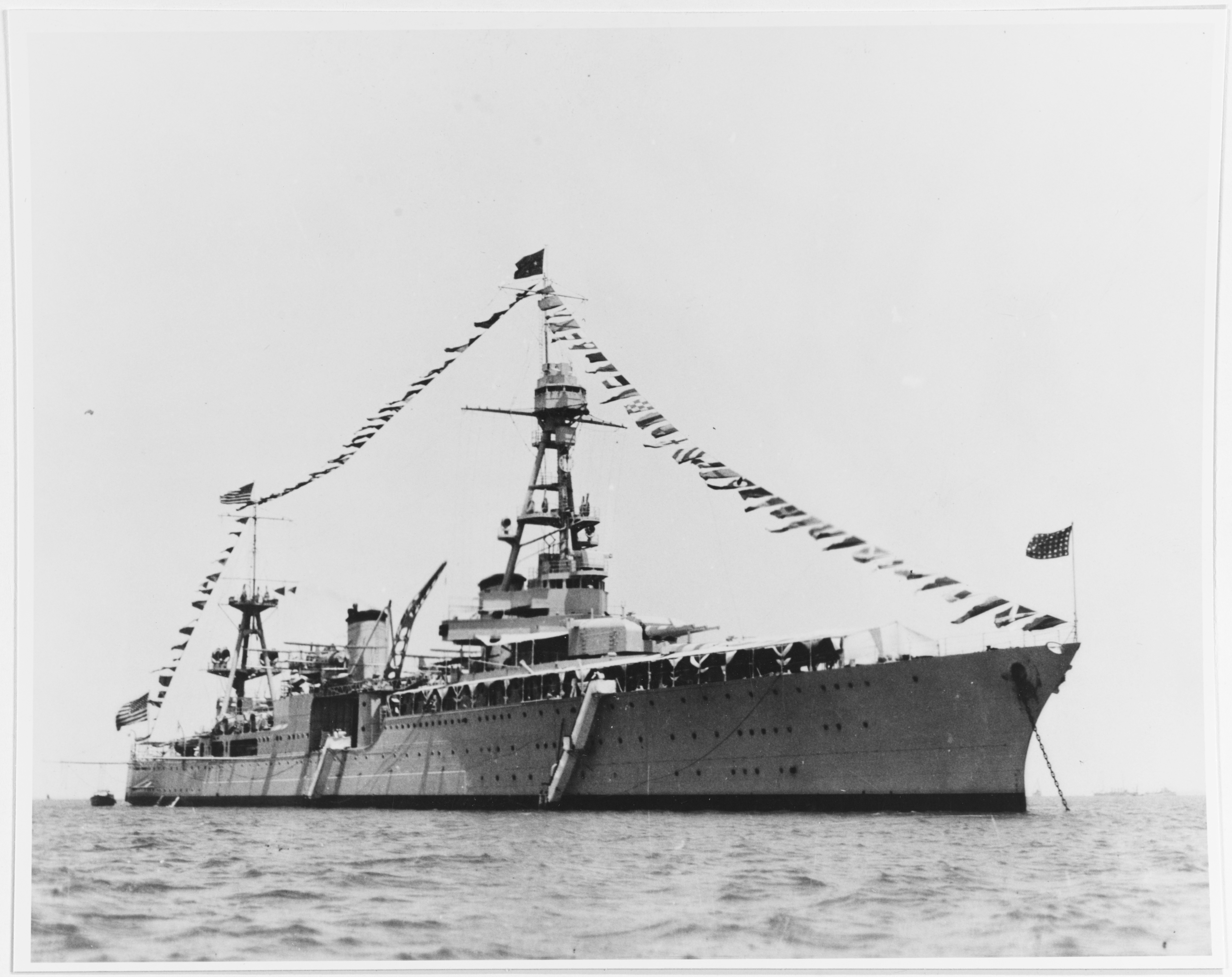
- The then-flagship of the Asiatic Fleet, the heavy cruiser Houston, at Qingdao, China, on 4 July 1933. She flies the four-star pennant of the fleet's commander-in-chief, Admiral Montgomery M. Taylor and is dressed overall for Independence Day.
- Active: 1902–07; 1910–42
- Allegiance: United States
- Branch: United States Navy
- Type: Naval fleet

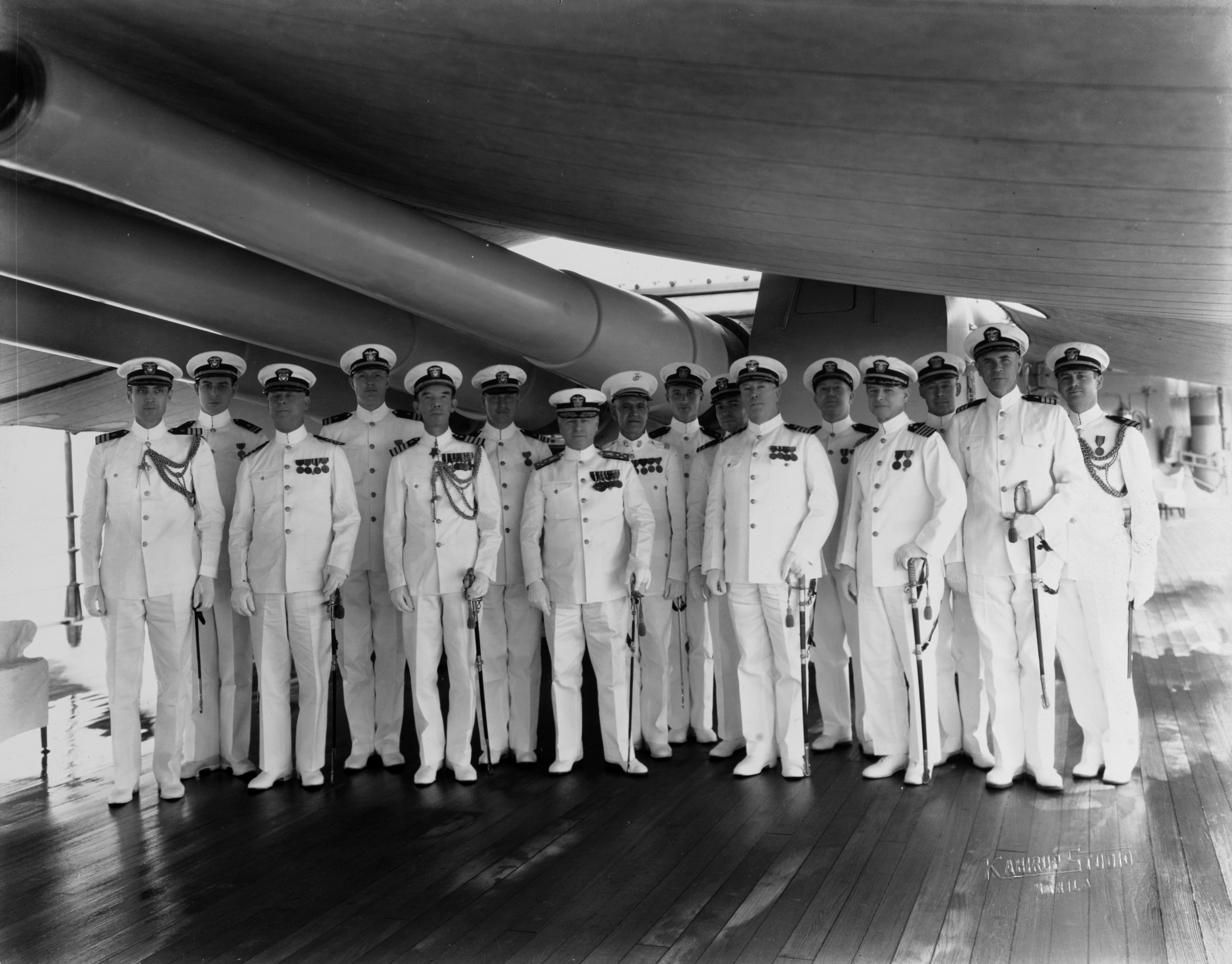
Admiral Frank B. Upham, Commander-in-Chief, U.S. Asiatic Fleet (front row, center), and his staff officers, c. 1935

The United States Asiatic Fleet was a fleet of the United States Navy during much of the first half of the 20th century. Before World War II, the fleet patrolled the Philippine Islands. Much of the fleet was destroyed by the Japanese by February 1942, after which it was dissolved, and the remnants incorporated into the naval component of the South West Pacific Area command, which eventually became the Seventh Fleet.

The fleet was created when its predecessor, the Asiatic Squadron, was upgraded to fleet status in 1902. In early 1907, the fleet was downgraded and became the First Squadron of the United States Pacific Fleet. However, on 28 January 1910, it was again organized as the Asiatic Fleet. Thus constituted, the Asiatic Fleet, based in the Philippines, was organizationally independent of the Pacific Fleet, which was based on the United States West Coast until it moved to Pearl Harbor in the Territory of Hawaii in 1940.

Although much smaller than any other U.S. Navy fleet and indeed far smaller than what any navy generally considers to be a fleet, the Asiatic Fleet from 1916 was commanded by one of only four four-star admirals authorized in the U.S. Navy at the time. This reflected the prestige of the position of Asiatic Fleet commander-in-chief, who generally was more powerful and influential with regard to the affairs of the United States in China than was the American minister, or later United States Ambassador, to China.

== 1902–1907 ==
In 1904, all armored cruisers were withdrawn from the Far East. Gunboats patrolled the Yangtze River in the Yangtze Patrol.

After Rear Admiral Charles J. Train became commander-in-chief of the fleet in March 1905, it was involved in various ways with the closing weeks of the Russo-Japanese War of 1904–1905. After the Imperial Japanese Navy's decisive defeat of the Imperial Russian Navy in the Battle of Tsushima Strait in May 1905, units of the Asiatic Fleet escorted three fleeing Russian cruisers into Manila Bay in the Philippine Islands, where Train ensured that their crews were well taken care of during a lengthy stay until they were able to return to Russia.

In November 1905, Train was at the center of a diplomatic dispute while with a group of American officers on a pheasant-hunting expedition near Nanjing (Nanking), China, when he accidentally shot a Chinese woman with birdshot, inflicting minor injuries on her. A mob of hundreds of Chinese villagers formed around Train's party and attacked it, pushing Train into the mud, seizing the officers' guns, and taking Train's son, Navy Lieutenant Charles R. Train, hostage. When the Asiatic Fleet landed 40 United States Marines to rescue the officers, the villagers attacked them with pitchforks and the Marines fired two shots. Local Chinese officials refused to return the officers' guns, but Train and his companions were able to extricate themselves without further injury to anyone. The governor of Nanjing later apologized for the mob's actions, returned the American officers' guns, and punished the ringleaders of the mob.

On 4 August 1906, Train died in Yantai (known to Westerners at the time as "Chefoo"), China, while still in command of the Asiatic Fleet. After a memorial ceremony, which Japanese Admiral Heihachiro Togo and other dignitaries attended at Yokohama, aboard Train's flagship, the battleship USS Ohio, the steamer Empress of China carried his body out of the harbor under escort en route to Washington, D.C.

In early 1907, the Asiatic Fleet was abolished, and its ships and personnel became the First Squadron of the United States Pacific Fleet.

== 1910–1937 ==
On 28 January 1910, the United States Asiatic Fleet was reestablished.

In December 1922 the U.S. Navy was restructured, with the U.S. Pacific Fleet and United States Atlantic Fleet combining to form a unified United States Fleet. However, the Asiatic Fleet remained a separate entity and was charged with defending the Philippines and Guam and with upholding the Open Door Policy in China.

Due to political unrest in China, the Asiatic Fleet assigned the gunboats USS Sacramento (PG-19) and USS Tulsa (PG-22) and destroyers to the Chinese ports of Amoy, Fuzhou, and Shantou in 1932 to protect American lives and property.

In late July 1937, the Asiatic Fleet's commander-in-chief, Admiral Harry E. Yarnell, took his flagship, the heavy cruiser Augusta, to the Soviet Union's main naval base in the Pacific, Vladivostok, along with four of the fleet's destroyers. The visit, urged by the Soviet government, was an attempt to display solidarity between the Soviet Union and the United States in the face of increasingly aggressive Japanese behavior in China and along the border between the Soviet Union and the Japanese puppet state of Manchukuo in Manchuria. The visit was unsuccessful in deterring further Japanese military operations in either area.

== Second Sino-Japanese War ==
The Second Sino-Japanese War began on 7 July 1937 with the Marco Polo Bridge Incident. The United States was not a participant in the conflict, but it complicated the Asiatic Fleet's mission as the fleet continued to maintain a presence and take action to protect American lives and property.

On 14 August 1937, Augusta with Yarnell aboard arrived at Shanghai from Qingdao just after the Battle of Shanghai began. That day, aircraft of the Republic of China Air Force mistakenly attacked the Royal Navy heavy cruiser HMS Cumberland in the harbor at Shanghai, but the bombs fell wide of Cumberland and did not damage her. Two bombs also fell close alongside Augusta, but there were no fatalities.

Japanese Special Naval Landing Force and Imperial Japanese Army forces landed on the coast of China at Shantou on 21 June 1939 and seized the city 12 hours later. At the time, 40 American citizens and 80 British nationals were ashore at Shantou and the Asiatic Fleet destroyer USS Pillsbury (DD-227) and the Royal Navy destroyer HMS Thanet were in the harbor. The Japanese peremptorily ordered the two ships to leave, and when the demand reached Yarnell aboard Augusta — anchored 1,500 miles (2,400 km) to the north at Qinhuangdao — Yarnell requested instructions from the United States Government, which in turn granted U.S. military personnel in China the authority to make decisions on their own initiative, a response to the Japanese government's habit of blaming any confrontation between Japanese and international forces in China on local Japanese commanders. With this authority in hand, Yarnell ordered Pillsbury to remain at Shantou, sent the destroyer USS Pope (DD-225) there as a reinforcement, and informed his Japanese counterpart, the commander-in-chief of the China Area Fleet, Vice Admiral Koshirō Oikawa, that U.S. Navy ships would remain present anywhere where U.S. lives and property were in danger. Thanet also remained at Shantou, reinforced by the destroyer HMS Scout, and the Japanese did not take further action against any of the ships or against U.S. or British nationals at Shantou.

== World War II ==
On 25 July 1939, Admiral Thomas C. Hart was appointed the commander-in-chief of the fleet. It was based at Cavite Naval Base and Olongapo Naval Station on Luzon, with its headquarters at the Marsman Building in Manila. On 22 July 1941, the Mariveles Naval Base was completed and the Asiatic Fleet began to use it as well.

Hart had permission to withdraw to the Indian Ocean, in the event of war with Japan, at his discretion.

Hart's submarines, commanded by Commander, Submarines, Asiatic Fleet (COMSUBAF) Captain John E. Wilkes were six elderly S-class submarines (plus submarine tender Canopus) and seven Porpoises ( Submarine Squadron 5). In October 1941, 12 Salmons or Sargos—in Captain Stuart "Sunshine" Murray's Submarine Division 15 and Captain Joseph A. Connolly's Submarine Division 16, accompanied by the tender Holland, were added. Walter E. "Red" Doyle was assigned as Wilkes' relief. Hart's defensive plan relied heavily on his submarines, which were believed to be "the most lethal arm of the insignificant Asiatic Fleet", to interdict the Japanese and whittle down their forces prior to a landing, and to disrupt attempts at reinforcing after the landings took place. When war began, Doyle's inexperience in Asian waters meant Wilkes remained de facto COMSUBAF.

Problems were encountered almost from the beginning. No defensive minefields were laid. Ineffective and unrealistic peacetime training, inadequate (or nonexistent) defensive plans, poor deployments, and defective torpedoes combined to make submarine operations in defense of the Philippines a foregone conclusion. No boats were placed in Lingayen Gulf, widely expected to be where the Japanese would land; in the event, several S boats, aggressively handled, scored successes there. Nor were any boats off ports of Japanese-held Taiwan, despite more than a week's warning of impending hostilities. Successes were few in the early days of the war.

=== Chinese detachment ===
From 1901 to 1937, the United States maintained a strong military presence in China, to protect trade interests in the Far East, and to pursue a permanent alliance with the Chinese Republic, after long diplomatic difficulties with the Chinese Empire. The relationship between the U.S. and China was mostly on-again off-again, with periods of both cordial diplomatic relations accompanied by times of severed relations and violent anti-United States protests. China's central government was relatively weak in comparison to the local influence of regional warlords. Armed renegade soldiers and boatmen prowled the Yangtze River ready to seize any vessel unable to defend itself.

The cooks, bakers, stewards, and mess attendants were exclusively Chinese aboard all gunboats and cruisers in Chinese waters. These men did not wear naval uniforms, but wore traditional Chinese civilian attire. They wore black satin slippers and a skullcap with a decorative button on top. The remainder of their clothing was made of white satin, consisting of long, rather loose pantaloons tied around the ankles and a short jacket fastened in front with frogs. Not considered part of the ships' crew were the Chinese girls who lived aboard sampans tied to the stern of each gunboat while moored at Shanghai. These sampans would shuttle members of the gunboat crew ashore upon request. The girls also painted the gunboat and polished brightwork in exchange for the ship's garbage.

In the 1920s and 1930s, the Asiatic Fleet was based from China, and the image of the "China Sailor" developed, as many U.S. Navy members remained at postings in China for 10–12 years, then retired and continued to live there. The classic film The Sand Pebbles is a dramatization on the life of the China Sailors.

The U.S. military also created several awards and decorations to recognize those personnel who had performed duty in China. The China Service Medal and Yangtze Service Medal were all military medals which could be presented to those who had performed duty in China.

With the approach of World War II, the U.S. military in China was slowly withdrawn to protect other U.S. interests in the Pacific. With the rise of Communist China, there was no further U.S. military presence in mainland China, a status which continues to this day.

Early in November 1941, the Navy Department ordered Hart to withdraw the fleet's Marines and gunboats stationed in China. Five of the gunboats were moved to Manila; Wake was left with a skeleton crew as a radio base and was seized by the Japanese on 8 December; and Tutuila was transferred to the Republic of China Navy under Lend-Lease.

The majority of the 4th Marine Regiment was stationed at Shanghai, and other detachments were at Beijing (Peking) and Tianjin (Tientsin). These troops were loaded onto two passenger liners, President Madison and President Harrison, on 27–28 November (at either Shanghai or Qinghuangdao) and arrived in the Philippines on 30 November-1 December.

President Harrison returned to Qinghuangdao for the remaining Marines, but was captured by the Japanese on 7 December. Those Marines who had reached the Philippines were tasked with defending the naval stations, particularly Mariveles Naval Base.

=== Minefields ===
Manila Bay and Subic Bay had Army-operated minefields as well as naval mines. The Army minefields were operated by the Coast Artillery's Harbor Defenses of Manila and Subic Bays. These minefields were designed to stop all vessels except submarines and shallow-draft surface craft. In Manila Bay, two controlled minefields were placed, one between Corregidor and La Monja Islands, and the other between Corregidor Island and the Bataan Peninsula east of Mariveles Bay, both operated from Corregidor. Also, in mid-1941 US Navy minefields of contact mines were laid between Mariveles Bay and La Monja Island, and between Corregidor and Carabao Islands. The Subic Bay minefield was laid in July 1941 and operated from Fort Wint, with the controlled Army mines in the ship channel, and naval mines to the sides of the channel.

=== Vessels of the Asiatic Fleet and the 16th Naval District: 8 December 1941 ===
The Asiatic Fleet and the 16th Naval District possessed:

(Losses noted below were during the Philippines campaign (1941-42) and the Dutch East Indies campaign)

- 1 heavy cruiser
  - Houston (lost 1 March 1942)
- 1 light cruiser
  - Marblehead (heavily damaged 2 February 1942)
- 13 Clemson-class destroyers:
  - Paul Jones
  - John D. Edwards
  - Alden
  - Whipple
  - Edsall (lost 1 March 1942)
  - Stewart (lost 2 March 1942)
  - Barker
  - Parrott
  - Bulmer
  - John D. Ford
  - Pope (lost 1 March 1942)
  - Peary (lost 19 February 1942)
  - Pillsbury (lost 2 March 1942)
- 1 destroyer tender
  - Black Hawk
- 2 coastal gunboats:
  - Asheville (lost 3 March 1942)
  - Tulsa
- 5 river gunboats:
  - Oahu (lost 5 May 1942)
  - Luzon (lost 6 May 1942)
  - Mindanao (lost 2 May 1942)
  - Tutuila
  - Wake (captured 8 December 1941)
- 4 patrol yachts
  - Isabel
  - Maryann (lost 5 May 1942)
  - Fisheries II (lost 5 May 1942)
  - Perry
- 29 submarines:
  - Porpoise
  - Pike
  - Shark (lost 11 February 1942)
  - Tarpon
  - Perch (lost 3 March 1942)
  - Pickerel
  - Permit
  - Salmon
  - Seal
  - Skipjack
  - Sargo
  - Saury
  - Spearfish
  - Snapper
  - Stingray
  - Sturgeon
  - Sculpin
  - Sailfish
  - Swordfish
  - S-36 (lost 21 January 1942)
  - S-37
  - S-38
  - S-39
  - S-40
  - S-41
  - Seadragon
  - Sealion (lost 25 December 1941)
  - Searaven
  - Seawolf
- 1 submarine rescue vessel
  - Pigeon (lost 4 May 1942)
- 3 submarine tenders:
  - Holland
  - Canopus (lost 10 April 1942)
  - Otus
- 6 minesweepers:
  - Finch (lost 10 April 1942)
  - Bittern (lost 10 December 1941)
  - Tanager (lost 4 May 1942)
  - Quail (lost 5 May 1942)
  - Lark
  - Whippoorwill
- 4 seaplane tenders:
  - Langley (lost 27 February 1942)
  - Childs
  - William B. Preston
  - Heron in support of Patrol Wing 10 (VP 101 and VP 102) with 28 Consolidated PBY-4 flying boats
- 1 Yard patrol craft
  - YP-97 (lost March 1942)
- 6 motor torpedo boats (Motor Torpedo Boat Squadron Three)
  - PT-31 (lost 20 January 1942)
  - PT-32 (lost 13 March 1942)
  - PT-33 (lost 15 December 1941)
  - PT-34 (lost 9 April 1942)
  - PT-35 (lost 12 April 1942)
  - PT-41 (lost 15 April 1942)
- 2 tankers:
  - Pecos (lost 1 March 1942)
  - Trinity
- 4 ocean-going tugboats
  - Napa (lost 9 April 1942)
  - Genesee (lost 5 May 1942)
  - Ranger, commandeered by US Navy (lost 28 February 1942)
  - Trabajador, commandeered by US Navy (lost 2 May 1942)
- 3 auxiliary yard ships
  - YAG-2 (lost 10 December 1941)
  - YAG-3 (lost May 1942)
  - YAG-4 (lost 12 April 1942)
- 1 two-masted schooner
  - Lanikai
- 1 floating dry dock
  - Dewey (lost 8 April 1942)
- 4 Harbor tugs
  - Banaag (lost 25 December 1941)
  - Iona (lost January 1942)
  - Mercedes (lost 2 January 1942)
  - Vaga
- 8 ferryboats and launches
  - Camia (YFB-683)
  - Dapdap (lost 2 January 1942)
  - Magdalena (YFB-687)
  - Rivera (YFB-685)
  - Rosal (YFB-682)
  - San Felipe (lost 6 May 1942)
  - Santa Rita (YFB-681)
  - Yacal (lost 2 January 1942)
- various other small ships

US government / Commonwealth of the Philippines ships

- 3 survey ships
  - USC&GS Fathomer (lost April 1942)
  - USC&GSS Pathfinder (lost 30 January 1942)
  - USC&GSS Research (damaged and beached on 30 December 1941)
- 2 customs inspection and enforcement cutters
  - Arayat (lost 27 December 1941)
  - Mindoro
- 2 lighthouse tenders
  - USLHT Canlaon (lost 27 December 1941)
  - USLHT Banahao (lost 28 December 1941)
- Presidential yacht
  - BRP Banahaw (lost 29 December 1941)

U.S. Army Mine Planter Service ships

- 2 mine planters
  - USAMP Col. George F. E. Harrison
  - USAJMP Neptune

United States Army Forces in the Far East ships

- 2 transports
  - General Miley
  - USAT General John McE. Hyde (lost 26 December 1941)
- 2 chartered transports
  - USHB Mambukal
  - USHB Neptune

The Offshore Patrol (technically part of the United States Army Forces in the Far East)

- 3 torpedo boats
  - Q-111 Luzon (lost 9 April 1942)
  - Q-112 Abra (lost 9 April 1942)
  - Q-113 Agusan
- 2 gunboats (converted motor launches)
  - Q-114 Danday
  - Q-115 Baler (lost 29 December 1941)

Civilian ships present

- MV Aloha
- Anakan
- SS Bicol (scuttled December 1941); later refloated by Japan
- Bisayas
- SS Capillo (lost 29 December 1941)
- SS Don Jose
- MV Ethel Edwards
- SS Corregidor (lost 17 December 1941)
- Henry Keswick (British tugboat later commandeered by the U.S. Army)
- Lanao
- LaTouche (refloat and renamed Ryochi Maru 良知丸)
- SS Magallanes
- Marinduque
- SS Mauban
- SS Manatawny
- SS Montanes
- SS Paz (sunk 26 December 1941)
- SS Marechal Joffre
- SS Palawan (scuttled December 1941); later refloated by Japan
- SS Samal (lost 29 December 1941)
- MV Si-Kiang
- Sagoland
- Tamaraw
- SS Taurus
- SS Vizcaya (scuttled December 1941)

=== Aircraft of the Asiatic Fleet: 8 December 1941 ===
The aviation elements of the Asiatic Fleet comprised Patrol Wing 10 (Capt. Frank D. Wagner), with two patrol squadrons (VPs or PatRons), a utility unit, and the aviation units aboard the Fleet's two cruisers and the large seaplane tender Langley.

Patrol Wing 10 had been commissioned in December 1940, and included Patrol Squadrons 101 (VP 101) and 102 (VP 102), each equipped with fourteen Consolidated PBY-4 Catalina flying boats. By Mid-1941, these 28 PBYs were numbered 1 through 14 for VP 101, 16 through 29 for VP 102. The Utility Unit included Grumman J2F Duck amphibians (1 J2F-2 and 4 J2F-4s), as well as five new Vought OS2U-2 Kingfisher floatplanes, delivered in the late summer. Also, a number of Curtiss SOC Seagull floatplanes were present. Houston carried four, Marblehead two, and Langley two or three, and two more were under repair or in storage at the Aircraft Overhaul Shop (Shop X 34) at Cavite Navy Yard.

As of 8 December, PBYs of Patrol Wing 10 patrolled the northwest and northeast of Luzon daily. These flights were based at either NAS Sangley Point, the Navy's auxiliary seaplane station at Olongapo on Subic Bay, or seaplane tender Childs in Manila Bay. Trios of PBYs rotated down to the southern islands to base on William B. Preston at Malalag Bay on Davao Gulf, Mindanao. These patrols over the Philippine Sea to the east bordered with similar patrols flown by Royal Netherlands Naval Air Service flying boats based in the Netherlands East Indies. Seaplane tender Heron, with a detachment of four OS2U-2s from the Utility Unit, ran morning and evening patrols from Port Ciego, Balabac Island, over the strategically important Balabac Straits from 4–13 December.

Early in the morning of 8 December, Preston dispatched one aircraft on patrol and a short time later was attacked by aircraft from the small Japanese carrier Ryūjō, and her other two PBYs were sunk on the water.

Patrol Wing 10 was ordered south into the Netherlands East Indies on 12 December, when the collapsing defenses of the islands made further operations untenable. Within the first 90 days of the war, Patrol Wing 10 had fallen back to Perth, Western Australia, being reinforced by VP 22 from Hawaii but losing 41 of 44 PBYs to enemy action together with Langley. Patrol Wing 10 also lost all but one utility aircraft.

- PBY-4 (28. Added: 12 PBY-5s from VP 22 and 5 ex-Dutch Catalinas in January)
- J2F-2 or -4 (4)
- OS2U-2 (5)
- SOC-1 or -2 / SON (10–12)

=== Asiatic Fleet components: 8 December 1941 ===
Asiatic Fleet Headquarters, ashore from mid-1941 at the Marsman Building on the Manila waterfront. The Fleet flagship, Houston, was assigned to lead Task Force 5 (TF 5).

TF 4, Asiatic Fleet: Patrol Wing 10, seaplane tenders, and aviation resources.

TF 5, Asiatic Fleet: surface strike forces, including cruisers and Destroyer Squadron 29 (DesRon 29).

TF 6, Asiatic Fleet: submarines force, including all submarines, tenders and rescue ships.

TF 7, Asiatic Fleet: patrol force, including gunboats Tulsa and Asheville.

4th Marine Regiment

Commandant 16th Naval District (COM16): The Cavite Navy Yard and all the shore establishment on Luzon, including the radio station, ammunition depot, hospital, Motor Torpedo Boat Squadron THREE, naval air station, mine depot, and similar facilities on Corregidor, at Mariveles, Bataan, and Olongpago, on Subic Bay.

The historic Yangtze Patrol was concluded in early December 1941. Of the five remaining gunboats, Tutuila remained at Chongqing, Wake was in reduced commission at Shanghai as a radio station for the U.S. State Department, and ComYangPat sailed in Luzon with Oahu for Manila, joined by Mindanao.

=== Battles fought by the Asiatic Fleet: early 1942 ===
As the Japanese sought sources of oil and minerals in the Netherlands East Indies and Borneo immediately following Pearl Harbor, the only fleet available to defend against them was the Asiatic Fleet. Outnumbered, outgunned, outmanned, the U.S. Navy, part of the ABDA (American, British, Dutch and Australian) force was unable to stop the Japanese, and could only attempt to slow them down.

==== Battle of Balikpapan: 24 January 1942 ====
Catching a Japanese invasion fleet of 16 transports, a cruiser and several destroyers anchored in Balikpapan Bay, four U.S. "four stacker" destroyers—John D. Ford, Pope, Paul Jones and Parrott—attacked at night using torpedoes and gunfire to sink four transports and one patrol craft. The Japanese believed that the attack came from submarines, and sent cruiser and destroyers out to sea in pursuit, leaving the transports unprotected. This was the first American surface action of the Pacific War and the first since the Spanish–American War. Although it significantly boosted morale, it had a negligible effect on Japanese operations.

==== Battle of Flores Sea: 4 February 1942 ====
Encouraged by the success of the Balikpapan raid, an attempt was made to break up another invasion when word was received that a Japanese force was planning a landing at Makassar on Celebes Island.

Planning a night attack, the ABDA force had to sail some distance in open water in daylight. It was attacked by Japanese bombers which severely damaged the light cruiser Marblehead and disabled turret No. 3 on the heavy cruiser Houston. The force retreated to Tjilatjap, Java, having failed to prevent the Japanese landing.

==== Battle of Badung Strait: 19/20 February 1942 ====
In an effort to break up another invasion, a small force of ABDA ships arrived on the island of Bali after the Japanese had made their landing and had retired, leaving only four Japanese destroyers on station. This attack failed. Three Japanese destroyers were damaged by gunfire, but the Dutch destroyer Piet Hein was sunk and a Dutch and American destroyer were damaged.

==== Battle of Java Sea: 27 February 1942 ====
This was the largest battle fought in the area. The ABDA force of five cruisers and 11 destroyers, led by Dutch Admiral Doorman sailed against a Japanese force of seven cruisers and 25 destroyers. The Japanese had air cover, while ABDA did not (nor in any of the other battles described here). It was a rout, fought during the afternoon and evening, a running gun battle with Japanese planes constantly dropping flares to illuminate the ABDA ships. The Dutch lost two cruisers and a destroyer, the British two destroyers. One Japanese destroyer was damaged.

==== Battle of Sunda Strait: 28 February 1942 ====
Retreating south to Batavia after the Battle of Java Sea the day before, the U.S. cruiser Houston and the Australian light cruiser HMAS Perth—while heading at high speed for Sunda Strait, between Sumatra and Java—came upon a Japanese invasion force making a landing in Bantam (now Banten) Bay. In a confused night battle, both ships were sunk inside the Bay and not in Sunda Strait as is usually written. The two Allied ships fought bravely, but were overwhelmed by superior numbers. Four of the Japanese transports were torpedoed, most likely by their own side. The Japanese fired 87 torpedoes in the first half-hour of the battle.

==== Battle of Java: 27 February 1942 to 3 March 1942 ====
Eight U.S. Navy Asiatic Fleet ships were sunk by enemy warships or airplanes during the Battle of Java when the Japanese invaded the island of Java. This was the final battle of the Dutch East Indies campaign. The seaplane tender (former aircraft carrier) Langley was transporting 32 brand new Curtiss P-40 Warhawk fighter planes from Australia to Java when she was sunk with 16 killed on 27 February. Hundreds more Langley survivors were killed when the other naval ships that rescued them were also sunk soon afterwards. The oil tanker Pecos was trapped and attacked by numerous Japanese ships and airplanes and was sunk on 1 March. 232 survivors were rescued and over 400 Pecos crew and survivors from Langley were left behind and drowned due to Japanese submarines threatening the U.S. ships that were rescuing the survivors. The destroyer Pope was attached to an Allied fleet as the only U.S. vessel and was sunk in the Second Battle of the Java Sea. The destroyer Stewart was badly damaged and scuttled at Surabaya on 2 March 1942. On 3 March the submarine Perch was sunk while attacking a Japanese convoy northwest of Surabaya. A major tragedy happened when three Asiatic Fleet warships, destroyers Edsall and Pillsbury and gunboat Asheville, were sunk on 1–3 March 1942 with no survivors while supporting the Allied forces during the Battle of Java. There were reports that there were prisoners-of-war from these 3 ships but none of them survived Japanese prisoner-of-war camps to tell their stories. No logs and no records of these three ships' final hours exist. The U.S. Navy did not know what happened to the ships and fallen sailors until after World War II. From these 3 ships approximately 450 crewmen and officers were killed or died while prisoners-of-war.

==== Half the U.S. Fleet lost ====
Of the 40 surface vessels in the Asiatic Fleet on Pearl Harbor Day, 19 were sunk by 5 May 1942, the day General Wainwright surrendered to the Japanese at Corregidor in the Philippines. Most of the surviving ships safely reached Australia.

=== Aftermath ===
After the defeats in the defense of the Philippine Commonwealth and the Dutch East Indies, the remaining vessels retreated to Australia. They would fall under the command of the South West Pacific Area which would establish the 7th Fleet in 1943.

== Commanders-in-Chief, Asiatic Fleet ==
The commanders-in-chief of the Asiatic Fleet were:

•	Rear Admiral Robley D. Evans	29 October 1902	–	21 March 1904
•	Rear Admiral Philip H. Cooper	21 March 1904	–	11 July 1904
•	Rear Admiral Yates Stirling	11 July 1904	–	23 March 1905
•	Rear Admiral William M. Folger	23 March 1905	–	30 March 1905
•	Rear Admiral Charles J. Train	30 March 1905	–	4 August 1906
•	Rear Admiral Willard H. Brownson	15 October 1906	–	31 March 1907
•	Rear Admiral William S. Cowles	1 April 1907	–	August 1908
	Asiatic Fleet abolished, became First Squadron, United States Pacific Fleet	1908
	Asiatic Fleet reestablished	28 January 1910
•	Rear Admiral John Hubbard	19 February 1910	–	16 May 1911
•	Rear Admiral Joseph B. Murdock	16 May 1911	–	24 July 1912
•	Rear Admiral Reginald F. Nicholson	24 July 1912	–	3 May 1914
•	Admiral Walter C. Cowles	3 May 1914	–	9 July 1915
•	Admiral Albert G. Winterhalter	9 July 1915	–	4 April 1917
•	Admiral Austin M. Knight	22 May 1917	–	7 December 1918
•	Vice Admiral William Ledyard Rodgers	7 December 1918	–	1 September 1919
•	Admiral Albert Gleaves	1 September 1919	–	4 February 1921
•	Admiral Joseph Strauss	4 February 1921	–	28 August 1922
•	Admiral Edwin A. Anderson Jr.	28 August 1922	–	11 October 1923
•	Admiral Thomas Washington	11 October 1923	–	14 October 1925
•	Admiral Clarence S. Williams	14 October 1925	–	9 September 1927
•	Admiral Mark L. Bristol	9 September 1927	–	9 September 1929
•	Admiral Charles B. McVay Jr.	9 September 1929	–	1 September 1931
•	Admiral Montgomery M. Taylor	1 September 1931	–	18 August 1933
•	Admiral Frank B. Upham	18 August 1933	–	4 October 1935
•	Admiral Orin G. Murfin	4 October 1935	–	30 October 1936
•	Admiral Harry E. Yarnell	30 October 1936	–	25 July 1939
•	Admiral Thomas C. Hart	25 July 1939	–	14 February 1942

== See also ==
- Philippine Department, USAFFE
- Military history of the Philippines
- Military history of the United States
- Far East Fleet (United Kingdom)
