= USS Tutuila (PR-4) =

Gunboat of the United States Navy

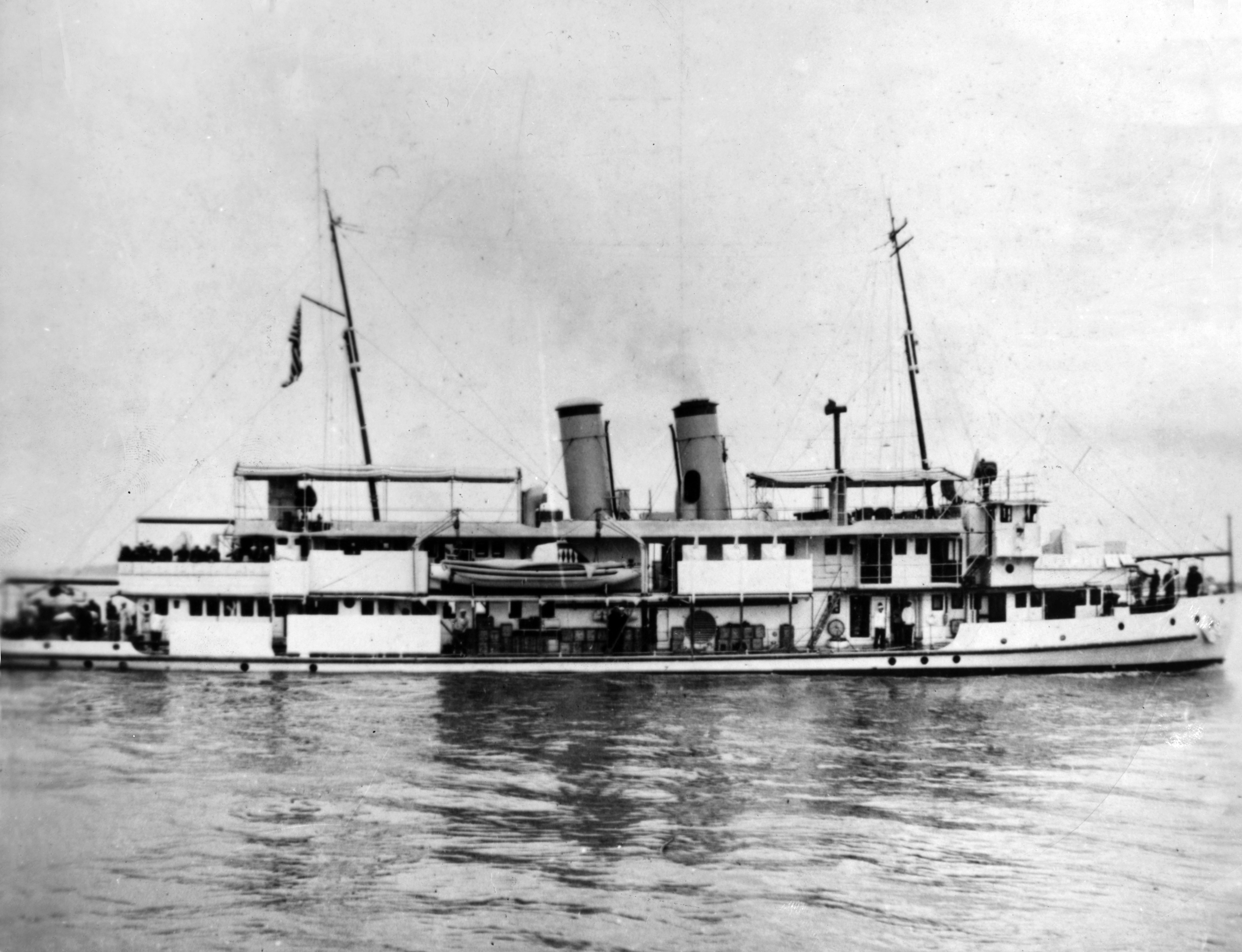

History

United States
- Name: Tutuila
- Namesake: The island of Tutuila
- Builder: Kiangnan Dockyard and Engineering Works, Shanghai
- Laid down: 17 October 1926
- Launched: 14 June 1927
- Commissioned: 2 March 1928
- Reclassified: PR-4, 16 June 1928
- Decommissioned: 18 January 1942
- Stricken: 26 March 1942
- Fate: Transferred to China under lend-lease, 16 February 1942; Permanent transfer, 17 February 1948

Republic of China
- Name: Mei Yuan
- Acquired: 16 February 1942
- Fate: Scuttled to prevent capture, May 1949

General characteristics
- Type: River gunboat
- Displacement: 395 long tons (401 t)
- Length: 159 ft 5 in (48.59 m)
- Beam: 27 ft 1 in (8.26 m)
- Draft: 5 ft 5 in (1.65 m)
- Speed: 14.37 kn (16.54 mph; 26.61 km/h)
- Complement: 61 officers and enlisted
- Armament: 2 × 3 in (76 mm) guns; 10 × .30 in (7.62 mm) machine guns

USS Tutuila (PR-4) was a gunboat in the service of the United States Navy from 1928, until her transfer to China, under lend-lease in 1942.

== Construction ==
Tutuila was laid down as gunboat PG-44 on 17 October 1926, at the Kiangnan Dockyard and Engineering Works in Shanghai, China; launched on 14 June 1927, sponsored by Miss Beverly Pollard; and commissioned on 2 March 1928.

== Service history ==
=== Yangtze Patrol, 1928-1937 ===
Assigned to the Yangtze Patrol (YangPat) and redesignated river gunboat PR-4 on 16 June 1928, Tutuila cruised on shakedown up the Yangtze River from Shanghai to Yichang, where she joined her sister ship Guam in mid-July. Convoying river steamers through the upper reaches of the Yangtze on her first passage through the scenic gorges, she flew the flag of Rear Admiral Yates Stirling Jr., Commander, Yangtze Patrol (ComYangPat). Tutuila's shallow draft enabled her to traverse the treacherous rapids of the gorges with ease, so that the fluctuating water levels did not hinder her year-round access to the upper stretch of the Yangtze. Her duty with YangPat offered excitement and variety: conducting roving armed patrols; convoying merchantmen; providing armed guards for American flag steamers; and "showing the flag" to protect American lives and property in a land where civil strife and warfare had been a way of life for centuries.

Dealing with sniping by bandits or warlord troops in the 1920s and 1930s required both tact and—on occasion—a few well-placed rounds of 3 in (76 mm) or .30 in (7.62 mm) gunfire. One incident which called for a mixture of diplomacy and force came in 1929, when Lt. Cdr. S. D. Truesdell was in command of the gunboat. He called on the Chinese warlord from whose territory some rifle shots had come. During a discussion of the incident, the general explained that his men were merely "country boys, who meant no harm". Truesdell replied that he, too, had some "country boys" among his own crew. He noted that he had found them tinkering with the after 3-inch gun, pointing it at the general's conspicuous white headquarters as they practiced their range-finding. Truesdell's rejoinder bore immediate fruit; the sniper fire ceased.

=== Sino-Japanese War, 1937-1941 ===
In 1937, the complexion of life for the Yangtze gunboats changed. The undeclared Second Sino-Japanese War began in July and spread to the Yangtze valley in August–September. Japanese river operations effectively bottled up the river for neutral gunboats, and their proximity to war zones produced incidents such as the sinking of Panay by Japanese aircraft on 12 December 1937. On 3 August 1938, Tutuila followed Luzon up the river to Chongqing, as the YangPat flagship carried the American Ambassador—Nelson T. Johnson—to that river port.

Tutuila remained at Chongqing as station ship with little hope of relief. Further Japanese operations resulted in the capture of Hankou in October 1938, making river travel below the former Chinese capital city subject to harassment and obstruction by the Japanese Navy. Such conditions resulted in the stranding of Tutuila at Chongqing, where she remained through 1941.

On 8 May 1940 Tutuila ran aground and was damaged. She remained stranded until refloated on 13 May then repaired and returned to service.

After the fall of Hankou, the Chinese moved their capital up river to Tutuila's station, Chongqing. Japanese forces thus stepped up the intensity of their attacks on that city, and air raids were common occurrences during the spring, summer, and fall. Only winter bad weather prevented the Japanese from year-round heavy raids. Moored at Lungmenhao Lagoon, Tutuila bore a charmed life until 31 July 1941, when Japanese bombs landed close aboard, holing the ship at her waterline and destroying the ship's motor skimmer with its outboard motor.

By late 1941, as the situation in the Far East worsened, four gunboats remained with YangPat and one in the South China Patrol. Admiral Hart's reduction of naval forces in Chinese waters cut this number to two. Luzon—with Rear Admiral William A. Glassford, ComYangPat, aboard—departed from Shanghai for Manila on 28 November 1941 in company with Oahu. Wake remained at Shanghai as station ship; Tutuila, beyond hope of escape, remained marooned at Chongqing. Mindanao departed Hong Kong at approximately the same time and arrived in the Philippines shortly after hostilities commenced.

=== World War II, 1941-1942 ===
Shortly after his arrival in Manila, RAdm. Glassford deactivated the Yangtze Patrol on 6 December 1941. Within a few days, Japanese air attacks had devastated Pearl Harbor; and hostilities were underway with a rapidity which caught Wake unawares at Shanghai, where she was captured. For Tutuila, however, this news only heightened the anxiety.

Her residual complement of two officers and 22 enlisted men was ordered to depart from Chongqing without their ship. She was then taken under the jurisdiction of the Naval Attaché attached to the American Embassy, Chongqing. She was decommissioned on 18 January 1942, the same day Tutuila's crew flew out of the city.

=== Republic of China Navy, 1942-1949 ===
The attaché delivered the ship to an authorized representative of the Republic of China on 16 February 1942. Then, under terms of lend-lease, the U.S. Navy leased the gunboat to China on 19 March, her name becoming Mei Yuan, which can be translated as "of American origin". The name Tutuila was struck from the U.S. Naval Vessel Register on 26 March.

The ship was permanently transferred to the Chinese government on 17 February 1948. She served the Nationalist Navy until near the end of the Civil War which ravaged China after World War II. As Communist forces advanced upon Shanghai, the Nationalists abandoned and scuttled Mei Yuan to prevent her capture. Her subsequent fate is unknown.

== Awards ==
- Yangtze Service Medal
- China Service Medal
- American Defense Service Medal
- Asiatic-Pacific Campaign Medal
- World War II Victory Medal
