= River gunboat =

Gunboat adapted for river operations

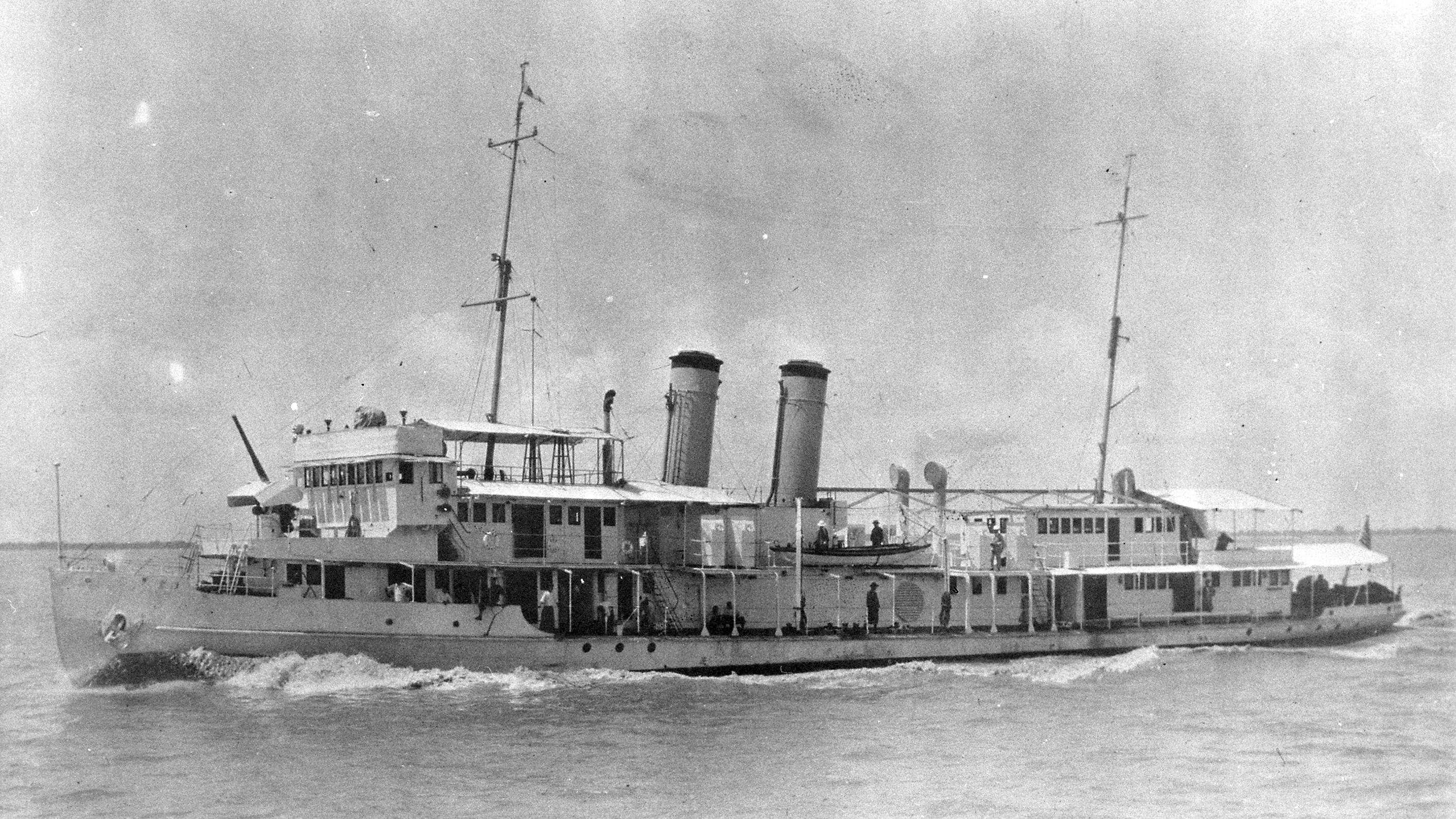
The USS Panay, a United States Navy river gunboat which served on the Yangtze Patrol.

A river gunboat is a type of gunboat adapted for river operations. River gunboats required shallow draft for river navigation. They would be armed with relatively small caliber cannons, or a mix of cannons and machine guns. If they carried more than one cannon, one might be a howitzer, for shore bombardment. They were usually not armoured. The fictional USS San Pablo described in Richard McKenna's The Sand Pebbles is an example of this class of vessel, serving on the US Navy's Yangtze Patrol. Stronger river warships with larger guns were river monitors.

== Chinese river gunboats ==
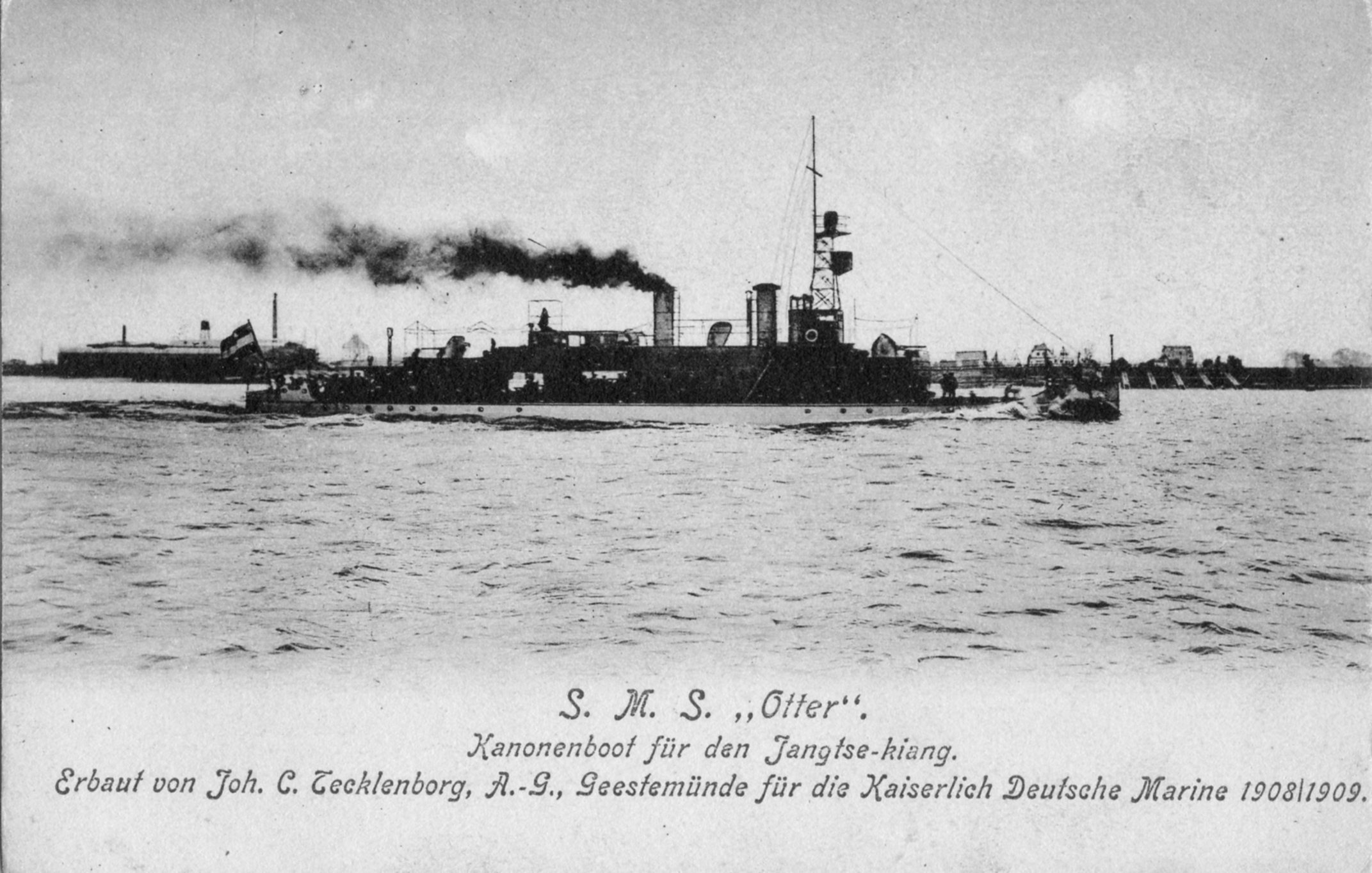
Imperial German Navy river gunboat SMS Otter c. 1909 during trials on the Weser

Various European powers, the US, and Japan, maintained flotillas of these shallow draft gunboats patrolling Chinese rivers. These gunboats were enforcing those nations' treaty rights under the treaties that China had started to sign following her defeat during the first Opium War with Britain. The advantages of steam power and shallow drafts meant that the new European vessels initially vastly outclassed anything available to the Chinese.

Foreign powers had received concessions from China, like extraterritoriality for their citizens in China, and the gunboats policed these rights.

=== British ===
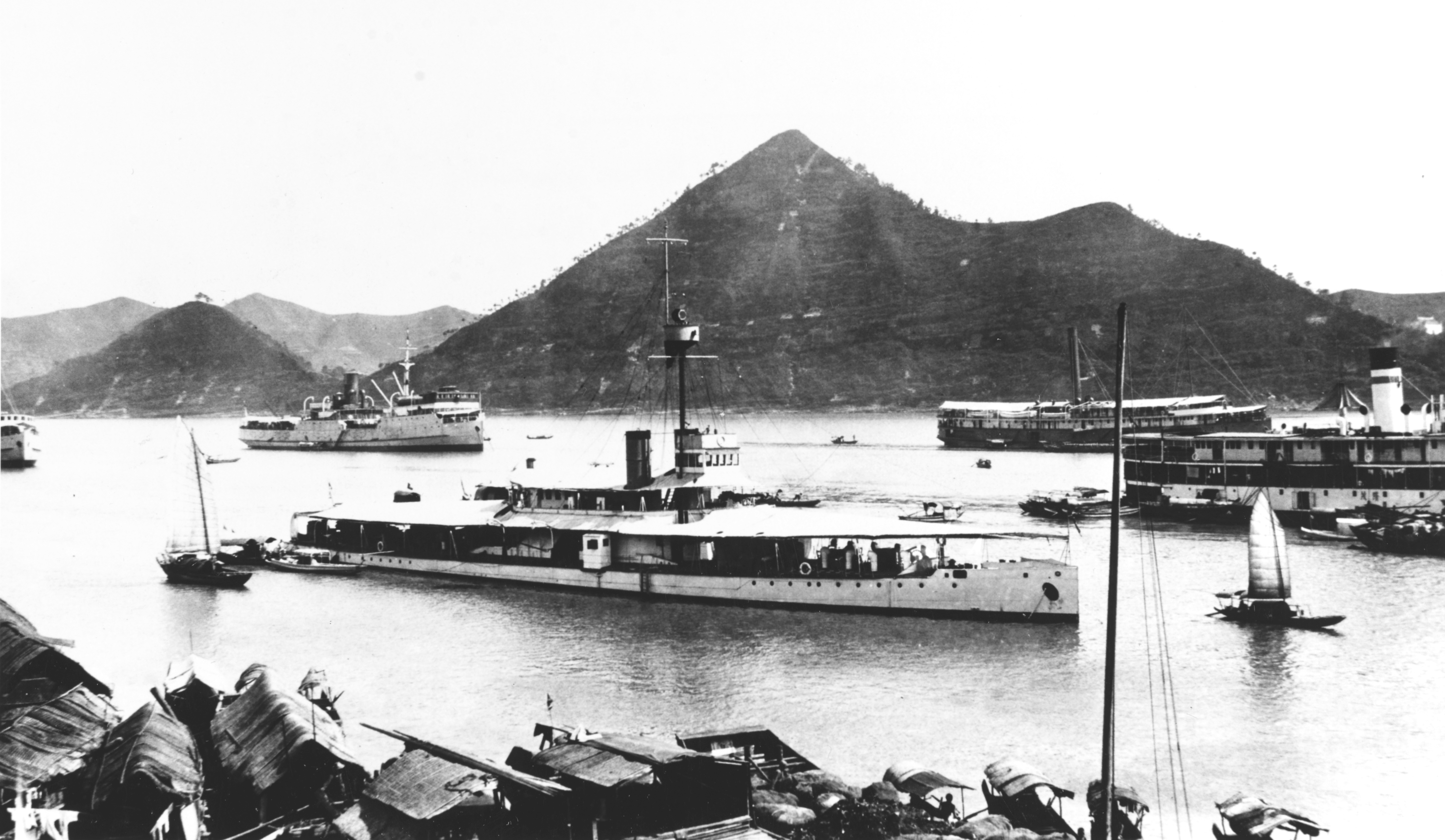
HMS Ladybird at Shanghai in the 1920s.

Royal Navy (RN) gunboats, numbering on average 15 a year in Chinese waters, served as "station ships", assigned to specific ports, and were designed for river functions. The RN maintained patrols and escorts up and down the Yangtze based in Shanghai until the end of the International Concessions in 1941. These boats were part of the Navy's China Station and vessels of various classes were deployed and often moved to and from other major world rivers. The Navy had built a large number of gunboats for the Crimean war in the 1850s and several of these found their way to the China Station afterwards. As these boats were scrapped, they were replaced by a new type of boat which was purpose-built for inshore and river service around the world, the Beacon- and later Frolic-class boats.

The purpose-built river vessels of the Insect and Fly classes which had seen service in the Mesopotamian Campaign in the Middle East and on the Danube during the First World War were deployed to China during the interbellum and took part in events of the period of the Japanese invasion of China and the beginning of the Pacific theatre of the Second World War. Ladybird and Bee were involved in the USS Panay incident. The Insects were supplemented in 1937 by the Dragonfly-class boats, three of which, Dragonfly, Grasshopper and Scorpion were involved in the fighting down the Malay Peninsula and Singapore.

=== United States ===
U.S. Navy craft were of varying age, design, size, and utility. The earliest craft made brief excursions upriver between 1861 and 1901 but were rarely assigned on permanent patrol. In 1901 two large gunboats, USS Helena (1290 tons and crew of 170) and Wilmington (1570 tons and 212), were assigned to the Asiatic Squadron's "Second Division" as permanent river patrol, although too large to patrol deep inland, until 1932 and 1923 respectively. In 1903 converted gunboats of the Spanish Navy captured in 1898, began patrols designed to take them further upriver toward Chongqing. USS Elcano, a 620-ton craft with a crew of 103, and USS Villalobos, a 350-ton ship with 50 men, served until 1928, when they were decommissioned and sunk. USS Callao (240 tons) and Quiros (sister ship to Villalobos) served until 1916 and 1923.

In 1914 two 204-ton, 50-man patrol craft of British design and built at Mare Island Naval Shipyard were disassembled, shipped to China, and reassembled in Shanghai. USS Palos patrolled until 1934, when she became the station boat at Chongqing, and Monocacy until 1939. The Yangtze Patrol was formally established in 1922 as a component of the Asiatic Fleet. Six new craft were designed and built in 1928 in Shanghai, of three differing sizes. USS Guam and Tutuilla, 380 tons and a crew of 60, were able to ply the entire river year-round. USS Panay and Oahu, 450 tons and a complement of 65; and Luzon, 560 tons and 82 men, were "May–September" gunboats, able to patrol completely upriver only during high water months. (Luzon's sister ship, USS Mindanao served on the China coast but not in the river patrol.) Except for Panay, sunk by Japanese aircraft in December 1937, the newer ships served in China until late 1941.

== See also ==
- USS Cairo
- The Sand Pebbles - A film based on the book of the same name
- Paraguayan War
- Steamboats on the Yangtze River
