= USS Luzon (PG-47) =

Gunboat of the United States Navy

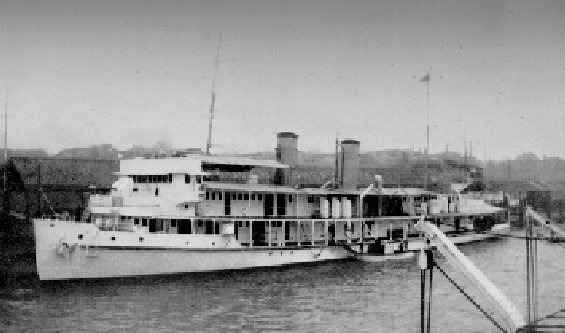
- USS Luzon PG-47/PR-7

History

United States
- Name: USS Luzon
- Namesake: Luzon
- Builder: Kiangnan Dock and Engineering Works, Shanghai
- Laid down: 20 November 1926
- Launched: 12 September 1927
- Commissioned: 1 June 1928
- Stricken: 8 May 1942
- Honors and awards: 1 battle star
- Fate: Scuttled 6 May 1942

Japan
- Name: Karatsu
- Fate: Torpedoed 3 March 1944; scuttled 5 February 1945

General characteristics
- Displacement: 500 long tons (508 t)
- Length: 210 ft 9 in (64.24 m)
- Beam: 31 ft (9.4 m)
- Draft: 6 ft (1.8 m)
- Speed: 16 kn (30 km/h)
- Complement: 80
- Armament: 2 × 3 in (76 mm) caliber guns; 10 × .30 cal (7.62 mm) machine guns

The first USS Luzon (PG-47) was laid down 20 November 1926 by the Kiangnan Dock and Engineering Works, Shanghai, China; launched 12 September 1927; sponsored by Miss Mary C. Carter, daughter of Commander Andrew F. Carter, USN; and commissioned 1 June 1928.

== Service history ==
One of eight gunboats built for service on the Yangtze River in China, Luzon was redesignated PR-7 on 15 June. From commissioning until December 1938, she served as the flagship of the Yangtze River Patrol, operating out of Hankou, between such ports as Nanjing, Chongqing, and Shanghai. In August 1937, after the Japanese had attacked Shanghai, Luzon evacuated the American Embassy staff to Chongqing.

In December 1938 the river gunboat arrived at Shanghai to relieve Augusta (CA-31) as station ship. Except for infrequent calls at Nanjing, Wuhu and other ports on the Yangtze, she remained off Shanghai until 29 November 1941 when she departed for the Philippines.

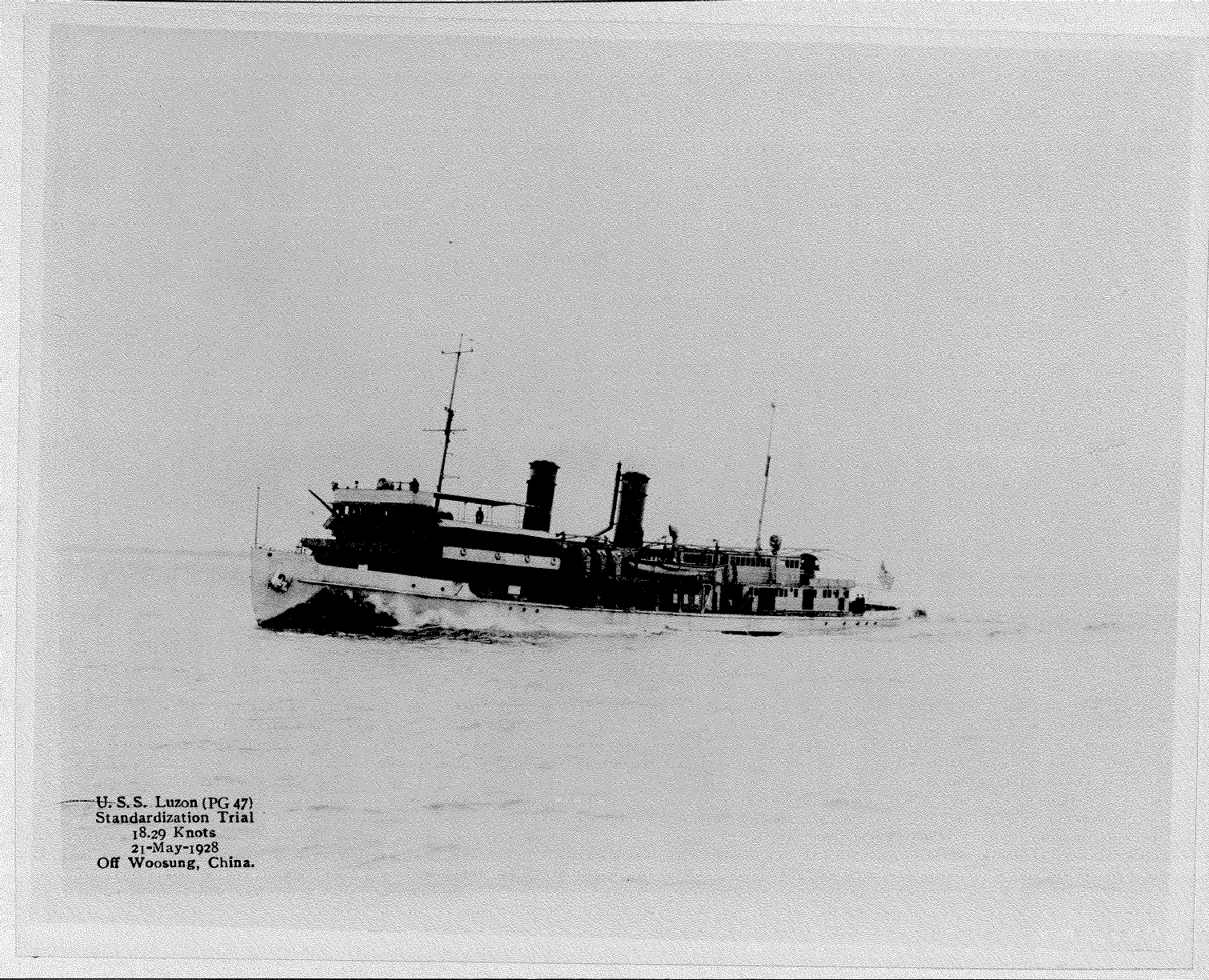
The Luzon in 1928 during standardization

Luzon arrived at Manila on 30 December, just 23 days after the Japanese attack on Pearl Harbor brought the United States into World War II. She then began patrol operations in the waters of the Philippines, assisting in the defense of both Bataan, from 1 February until the surrender of the peninsula to the Japanese 9 April, and Corregidor, from the beginning evacuations of that entrance island to Manila Bay until the enemy landings 5 May.

The next day, with the surrender of the Corregidor and Manila Bay forts to the Japanese, Luzon, along with Oahu (PR-6) and Quail (AM-15), were scuttled in Manila Bay to prevent capture, and subsequently struck from the Navy List on 8 May 1942.

== Service in Japan ==
In late May 1942, the Luzon was salvaged by the Imperial Japanese Navy (IJN), and repair begun at the 103rd Repair Facility at Cavite. Her forward 3-inch AA gun was replaced by a built-up superstructure and her bow was adorned with two Imperial crests, one on each side. On 1 August, Luzon was renamed Karatsu (唐津) by the Japanese, after the city of Karatsu and assigned to the Sasebo Naval District. There, she was assigned to the Southwest Area Fleet's Third Southern Expeditionary Fleet, then commanded by Vice Admiral Ibō Takahashi. Although classified by the Japanese as a river gunboat, repair work continued to convert her into a sea-going submarine chaser, including the installation of a sonar system. Refit work was completed on 14 October, and she was reassigned to the Cebu Guard Unit the following day.

For the next two years, she operated mostly in conjunction with Imperial Japanese Army to conduct counter-guerrilla operations, with secondary escort/patrol missions. It was during one of these missions the she helped sink the submarine Cisco (SS-290), assisted by two Nakajima B5Ns from the IJN 954th Air Group (海軍第954航空隊九七艦攻). On 3 March 1944, the Karatsu was torpedoed off the Philippine Islands by the Narwhal (SS-167), and had to be towed back to Cebu with her bow blown back to the bridge. The damage was too extensive for repairs at Cebu, and she was towed to Manila to No. 103 Repair Facility at Cavite. On 22 January 1945, before the repairs could be completed, she was ordered to depart Manila as soon as possible. Unable to complete the work in time, the IJN decided to scuttle her in order to block a channel in Manila Bay on 5 February. On 10 April, Karatsu was struck from the IJN naval list.

== Awards ==
- Yangtze Service Medal
- China Service Medal
- American Defense Service Medal with "FLEET" clasp
- Asiatic–Pacific Campaign Medal with one battle star
- World War II Victory Medal
- Philippine Defense Medal
