= USLHT Canlaon =

History

United States Lighthouse Service
- Name: USLHT Canlaon
- Namesake: Mount Kanlaon
- Owner: Commonwealth of the Philippines
- Ordered: 23 June 1930
- Builder: Schichau-Werke
- Yard number: 1236
- Launched: 29 November 1930
- Completed: February 1931
- Homeport: Manila
- Fate: Sunk by air attack, 27 December 1941

General characteristics
- Class & type: lighthouse tender
- Tonnage: 667 GT, 225 NT
- Length: 52.5 metres (172 ft 3 in)
- Beam: 9.1 metres (29 ft 10 in)
- Draught: 4.0 metres (13 ft 1 in)
- Installed power: 1,100 ihp

USLHT Canlaon was lighthouse tender that served in the Philippines.

== History ==
On 23 June 1930, she was ordered by the government of the Commonwealth of the Philippines from the German shipbuilder Schichau-Werke, the first of three cutters ordered from Schichau-Werke to serve with the Bureau of Customs as inspection and enforcement ships (the other two ships were her sister ship Banahao and the 903-GRT Arayat). She was laid down at Schichau's Danzig shipyard, launched on 29 November 1930, completed in February 1931, and delivered on 25 February 1931. Canlaon was later converted to a lighthouse tender. In 1936, she assisted in the salvage of the survey vessel USC&GS Fathomer.

During the Japanese invasion the Philippines, she returned to her home port of Manila where the Asiatic Fleet had retreated. On 27 December 1941, Japanese attack planes from the 1st Kōkūtai and the Takao Kōkūtai attacked Manila Bay. Canlaon, while moored in the Pasig River, received a direct hit and sunk. Customs cutters Arayat and Mindoro, and motor vessel Ethel Edwards were set ablaze while the steamship Taurus was so heavily damaged, she was scuttled.
