= Japanese patrol boat No. 105 =

Cutter (1931–1944)

History

Philippine Commonwealth
- Name: Arayat
- Namesake: Mount Arayat
- Owner: Philippine Commonwealth
- Ordered: 6 December 1930
- Builder: Schichau-Werke
- Yard number: 1253
- Launched: 9 May 1931
- Completed: 6 July 1931
- Home port: Manila
- Fate: Sunk by air attack, 27 December 1941

Japan
- Acquired: raised and repaired, 1 September 1943
- Renamed: Patrol Boat No. 105
- Stricken: 10 January 1945
- Fate: Sunk by PT boat attack, 28 November 1944

General characteristics
- Class & type: cutter
- Tonnage: 903 GRT; 271 NRT
- Length: 66.6 m (218 ft 6 in)
- Beam: 10.2 m (33 ft 6 in)
- Draught: 6.7 m (22 ft 0 in)
- Installed power: 2,200 ihp (1,600 kW)
- Complement: 53

Patrol Boat No. 105 (第百五號) (ex-Arayat) was a former Philippine Commonwealth customs inspection and enforcement cutter that was sunk by the Japanese during the invasion of the Philippines and later raised and designated as a patrol boat in the Imperial Japanese Navy.

== History ==
On 6 December 1930, she was ordered by the United States Bureau of Insular Affairs from the German shipbuilder Schichau-Werke, the third of three cutters ordered from Schichau-Werke to serve with the Bureau of Customs as inspection and enforcement ships (the other two were 667 GRT sister ships Canlaon and Banahao, both later converted to lighthouse tenders). She was laid down at Schichau's Danzig shipyard, launched on 9 May 1931, and delivered on 13 August 1931.

During the Japanese invasion the Philippines, she returned to her home port of Manila where the Asiatic Fleet had retreated. On 27 December 1941, Japanese attack planes from the 1st Kōkūtai and the Takao Kōkūtai attacked Manila Bay setting Arayat, her fellow customs cutter Mindoro, and the motor vessel Ethel Edwards ablaze while also sinking the lighthouse tender Canlaon outright, and so heavily damaging the steamship Taurus, her crew was forced to scuttle her.

She was raised by the Imperial Japanese Navy and rebuilt at the No. 103 Repair Facility at Cavite Naval Base. On 1 September 1943, she was renamed Patrol Boat No. 105, and registered in the Sasebo Naval District, and assigned to the Third Expeditionary Fleet, Southwest Area Fleet, based out of Manila.

=== Battle of Ormoc Bay ===
On 5 October 1944, she left Miri along with Type D escort ships CD-18 and CD-26 providing escort for Myogi Maru, Heian Maru, Mikasa Maru, and Teiyu Maru (ex-Carignano) headed for Manila. The convoy was carrying supplies for the besieged forces on Leyte Island. The convoy arrived safely at Manila on 2 November 1944. On 27 November 1944, she departed Manila as part of convoy TA-6 with No.28-class submarine chasers CH-45 and CH-53 and freighters Shinsho Maru and Shinetsu Maru. On 28 November 1944, the convoy arrived safely at Ormoc Bay, Leyte. The three escorts were assigned to guard the entrance to the harbor while the transports unloaded. They were soon confronted by American PT boats, PT-127 and PT-331 who each launched 4 torpedoes sinking CH-53 at (10°59′N 124°33′E) and heavily damaging PB-105 which was run aground and abandoned (the Americans capture her hulk on 8 December 1944). The transports were able to unload their much-needed supplies although after departing, Shinetsu Maru and CH-45 were sunk by American planes on 29 November 1944 and Shinsho Maru met the same fate on 30 November 1944.

On 10 January 1945, PB-105 was struck from the Naval List.
