= USS Mindanao (PR-8) =

Gunboat of the United States Navy

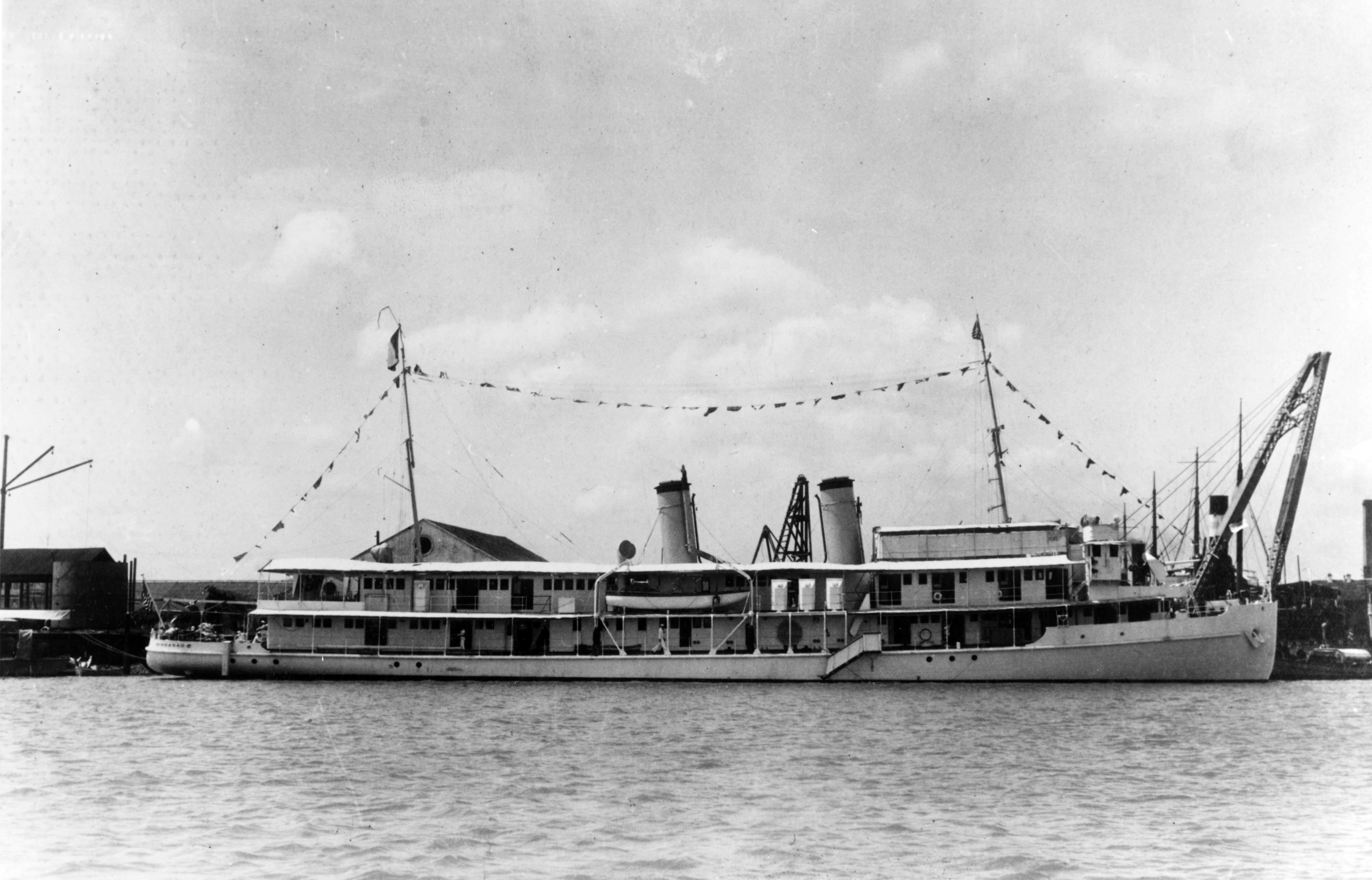
- USS Mindanao (PR-8)

History

United States
- Name: Mindanao
- Namesake: Island of Mindanao
- Builder: Kiangnan Dock & Engineering Works
- Laid down: 20 November 1926
- Launched: 28 September 1927
- Commissioned: 10 July 1928
- Stricken: 8 May 1942
- Honors and awards: 1 battle star (WWII)
- Fate: Sunk to avoid capture on 2 May 1942

General characteristics
- Displacement: 560 long tons (569 t)
- Length: 210 ft 9 in (64.24 m)
- Beam: 31 ft 1 in (9.47 m)
- Draft: 5 ft 7 in (1.70 m)
- Speed: 16 knots (18 mph; 30 km/h)
- Complement: 65
- Armament: 2 × 3 in (76 mm) guns; 10 × .30 caliber machine guns

The first USS Mindanao (PR‑8) was a river gunboat in the service of the United States Navy before and during World War II.

== Construction and commissioning ==
Mindanao was laid down as patrol gunboat PG-48 on 20 November 1926, by Kiangnan Dock and Engineering Works, Shanghai, China; launched on 28 September 1927; reclassified as river gunboat PR-8; sponsored by Mrs. E. A. McIntyre, wife of Lieutenant Commander McIntyre; and commissioned at Shanghai on 10 July 1928.

== River patrol in China ==
Departing Shanghai on 28 July 1928, Mindanao conducted shakedown up the Yangtze River, steaming to Chongqing and Wanxian and returning downstream to Shanghai on 31 August. The gunboat stood out again on 10 September to return to Wanxian and take up station. Arriving on 22 September, the ship remained there on Yangtze Patrol convoy duty until sailing back to Shanghai for fuel and repairs on 28 December. She underwent overhaul until 21 March 1929, and then cruised upriver on patrol, returning intermittently to Shanghai to investigate political conditions. On 2 May, the warship called for Hong Kong and thence to Canton, arriving 14 June where she became flagship of the South China Patrol Force, U.S. Asiatic Fleet. For the next 12½ years, Mindanao cruised the southern coast of China, based alternately at Hong Kong and Canton, protecting American and Allied interests in China and suppressing piracy. In October 1938, following the Japanese invasion of southern China and seizure of Canton, she commenced operations to guard American neutrality.

== World War II service ==
On 2 December 1941 — as Japanese aggression was expected shortly and the small, lightly armed ship could not hope to combat the overwhelming odds facing her in China — the gunboat received orders to sail to the Philippines with Luzon Stevedoring tugboat Ranger to catch up with her later. Though designed only for river travel, the valiant craft put to sea from Hong Kong on 4 December. Bucking heavy winds and high seas, she stubbornly remained on course for Luzon. At 03:40 on the night of 8 December, she received word of the Japanese attack on Pearl Harbor. Immediately going to general quarters, the crew remained near their guns throughout the passage, and on 9 December intercepted and sank a small Japanese trawler (South Advance Maru No. 3), 50 miles northwest of Bolinao, Pangasinan at 16°42′N 118°53′E, taking 10 prisoners-of-war, among the first taken by Americans in World War II (the first POW was Kazuo Sakamaki, sole survivor of the midget submarine attack on Pearl Harbor). Mindanao concluded this dangerous and eventful voyage upon arrival at Manila Bay the next day.

Assigned to inshore patrol and guard duty in Manila Bay, the gunboat acted as station ship in connection with the minefield channels near Corregidor until the end of December 1941, and then took nightly turns with China river gunboats USS Luzon (PR-7) and USS Oahu (PR-6) patrolling east of Bataan. The shortage of fuel in the Philippines ended these patrols in early March, and the ships instead took turns watching for Japanese small craft at a position 3 miles east of Corregidor. On the afternoon of 25 March, they engaged nine enemy boats.

On the night of 5 April, during the Battle of Bataan, the Mindanao and Oahu engaged the Japanese 21st Independent Engineer Regiment sailing south off Bataan's east coast, sinking several enemy craft.

Mindanao harassed enemy artillery east of Bataan on 6 April. The same day, the gunboat helped rescue some 60 American soldiers from both shore artillery and enemy aircraft. The ship repeatedly closed the beach to support small boats embarking the soldiers.

When the naval situation in Manila Bay appeared hopeless, Mindanao’s crew was ordered ashore on 10 April to help defend Fort Hughes. Hit by shell fire the same day, the gunboat was stripped of all useful gear. On 2 May 1942, after suffering an aerial bomb hit in the engine room, she was sunk to prevent capture.

Mindanao received one battle star for World War II service.
