= USLHT Banahao =

History

United States Lighthouse Service
- Name: USLHT Banahao
- Namesake: Mount Banahao
- Owner: Commonwealth of the Philippines
- Ordered: 23 June 1930
- Builder: Schichau-Werke
- Yard number: 1237
- Launched: 13 December 1930
- Completed: March 1931
- Home port: Manila
- Fate: Sunk by air attack, 28 December 1941

General characteristics
- Class & type: lighthouse tender
- Tonnage: 667 GT, 225 NT
- Length: 52.5 metres (172 ft 3 in)
- Beam: 9.1 metres (29 ft 10 in)
- Draught: 4.0 metres (13 ft 1 in)
- Installed power: 1,100 ihp

USLHT Banahao was lighthouse tender that served in the Philippines.

== History ==
On 23 June 1930, she was ordered by the government of the Commonwealth of the Philippines from the German shipbuilder Schichau-Werke, the second of three cutters ordered to serve with the Bureau of Customs as inspection and enforcement ships (the other two ships were her sister ship Canlaon and the 903 GT Arayat). She was laid down at Schichau's Danzig shipyard, launched on 13 December 1930, completed in March 1931, and delivered on 4 March 1931. Banahao was later converted to a lighthouse tender.

During the Japanese invasion the Philippines, she returned to her home port of Manila where the Asiatic Fleet had retreated. On 28 December 1941, she was attacked by Japanese planes and sunk. Philippine freighter Mauban was also sunk. She was later raised by the Imperial Japanese Army. Her ultimate fate is unknown.
