= USS Wake =

Gunboat of the United States Navy

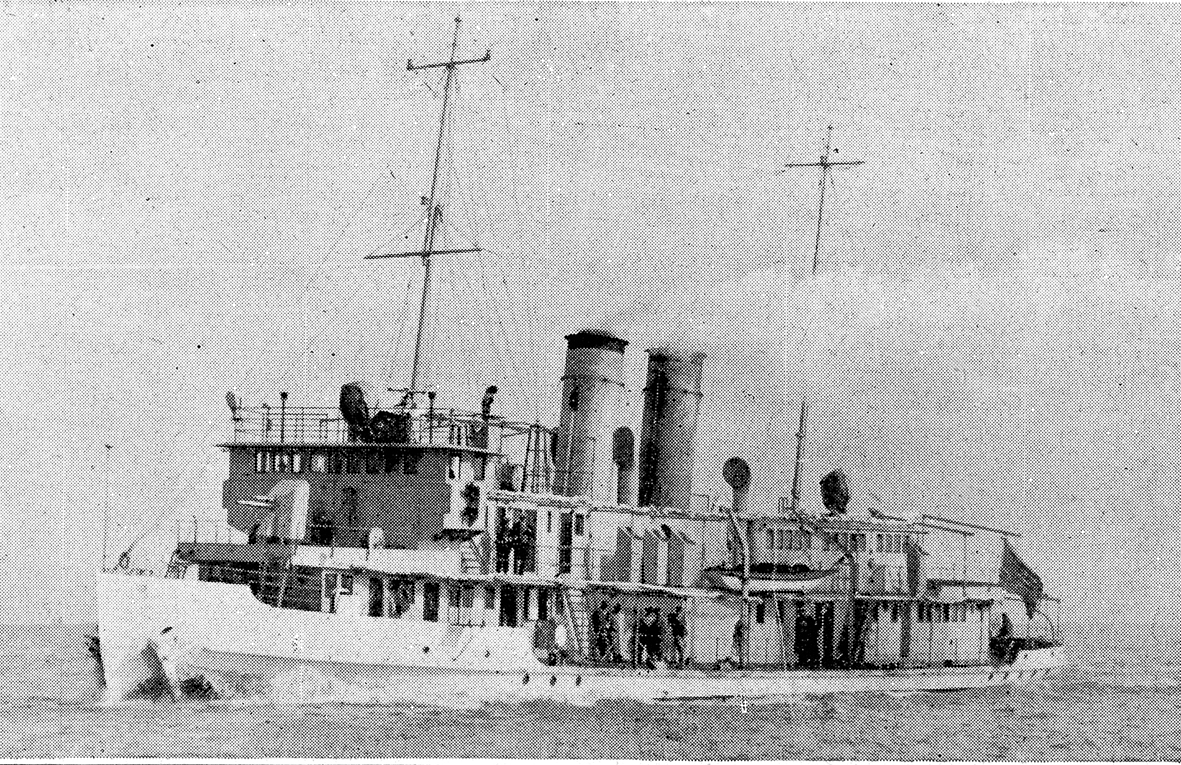

History

United States
- Name: Wake
- Namesake: Wake Island
- Builder: Kiangnan Dock and Engineering Works, Shanghai
- Launched: 28 May 1927
- Commissioned: 28 December 1927, as Guam (PG-43)
- Renamed: Wake, 23 January 1941
- Reclassified: PR-3 (River Gunboat), 15 June 1928
- Stricken: 25 March 1942
- Fate: Captured by the Imperial Japanese Navy, 8 December 1941

Japan
- Name: Tatara (多多良)
- Acquired: by capture, 8 December 1941
- Stricken: 30 September 1945
- Fate: Recaptured by U.S. Navy, August 1945; Transferred to China, 1946

Republic of China
- Name: RCS Tai Yuan (太原)
- Acquired: 1946
- Fate: Captured by Communist Chinese forces, 1949

People's Republic of China
- Acquired: 1949
- Fate: Active until the 1960s

General characteristics
- Type: Gunboat
- Displacement: 350 long tons (356 t)
- Length: 159 ft 5 in (48.59 m)
- Beam: 27 ft 1 in (8.26 m)
- Draft: 5 ft 3 in (1.60 m)
- Installed power: 1,900 ihp (1,400 kW)
- Propulsion: 2 × triple expansion steam engines; 2 × screws
- Speed: 14.5 kn (16.7 mph; 26.9 km/h)
- Complement: 59
- Armament: Original: 2 × 3"/23 guns (2x1) 8 × .30-06 Lewis machine guns (8x1); 1942: US 3"/23 guns replaced with 3"/25 Type 41 AA guns.; Jan 1945: Several Type 93 13.2 mm (0.52 in) M.G.s installed

USS Wake (PR-3) was a United States Navy river gunboat operating on the Yangtze River. Originally commissioned as the gunboat Guam (PG-43), she was redesignated river patrol vessel PR-3 in 1928, and renamed Wake 23 January 1941. She was captured by Japan on 8 December 1941 and renamed Tatara. After her recapture in 1945, she was transferred to Chinese nationalists, who renamed her Tai Yuan. Communist forces captured her in 1949. On 1 May 1949 Tai Yuan was sunk by Nationalist aircraft in the Caishiji River.

== Service history ==
=== U.S. Navy ===
She was launched on 28 May 1927 as Guam by the Kiangnan Dock and Engineering Works in Shanghai, China, and commissioned on 28 December 1927. Her primary mission was to ensure the safety of American missionaries and other foreigners. Later, the ship also functioned as a "radio spy ship," keeping track of Japanese movements. However, by 1939, she was "escorted" by a Japanese warship wherever she went, as China fell more and more under Imperial Japanese control.

In 1930 when it was nearing Yochow it was shot at by rebels, which killed one crew.

On 23 January 1941, she was renamed Wake, as Guam was to be the new name of a large cruiser being built in the U.S. On 25 November 1941, LCDR Andrew Earl Harris, the brother of Field Harris, was ordered to close the Navy installation at Hankou, and sail to Shanghai. On 28 November 1941, LCDR Harris and most of the crew were transferred to gunboats and ordered to sail to the Philippines. Columbus Darwin Smith—an old Chinese hand who had been piloting river boats on the Yangtze River—was asked to accept a commission in the U.S. Navy and was appointed captain of Wake with the rank of Lt. Commander.

When Pearl Harbor was attacked on December 7th, 1941. Shanghai had been under Japanese occupation since the 1937 Battle of Shanghai. Smith was in command on 8 December 1941 (7 December in Hawaii), with a crew of 14, when the Japanese captured the ship, which was tied up at a pier in Shanghai. Smith had received a telephone call the night before from a Japanese officer he knew. The officer asked where Smith would be the next morning as he wanted to deliver some turkeys for Smith and his crew. The Japanese did the same to other American officers and officials to determine where they would be on 8 December. However, Commander Smith received word from his quartermaster about the Pearl Harbor attack and rushed to the ship only to find it under guard by the Japanese. Surrounded by an overwhelming Japanese force, the crew attempted unsuccessfully to scuttle the craft. Wake was the only U.S. Navy vessel to have been captured by the enemy intact in World War II.

Commander Smith and his crew were confined to a prison camp near Shanghai, where the U.S. Marines and sailors captured on Wake Island were also later imprisoned.

=== Japanese service ===
The Japanese gave Wake to their puppet Wang Jingwei regime in Nanjing, where she was renamed Tatara (多多良). The following activities are known to have occurred during the war.

Date	Activity
15 December 1941	Refit began at Kiangnan Engineering and Dock Works.
26 January 1942	Refit finished.
11 October 1942	Runs aground off Nanjing.
12 October 1942	Returns to Kiangnan E. & D. W. for repairs.
5 November 1942	Repairs finished.
3 June 1944	Attacked by B-24s without damage.
18 June 1944	Attacked by three B-25s without damage.
2 December 1944	Attacked by six P-51 Mustangs.
7 December 1944	Attacked by two P-51s.
18 Dec 1944	Attacked by three P-51s.
24 Dec 1944	Sails for Kiangnan.
1 Jan 1945	Enters Kiangnan E. & D.W. for repairs and an AA upgrade.
3 Feb 1945	Repairs finished.

The ship was part of Sasebo Naval District for China Area Fleet.

=== Post-war ===
In 1945, at the end of the war, she was returned to the U.S. when the Japanese troops surrendered (VJ Day). The U.S. gave the ship to the Chinese nationalists, who renamed her Tai Yuan (太原). Finally, the ship was captured by Communist Chinese forces in 1949. On 1 May 1949 Tai Yuan was sunk by Nationalist aircraft in the Yangtze River near Caishi Rock.

As of 2019, no other ship of the U.S. Navy has been named Wake, though a Casablanca-class escort carrier launched in 1943 was named Wake Island. Wake Island is a remote Pacific island used as a US military base, and the site of a WW2 Battle in December 1941 (Battle of Wake Island).

== Awards ==
- Yangtze Service Medal
- China Service Medal
- American Defense Service Medal with "FLEET" clasp
- Asiatic–Pacific Campaign Medal with one battle star
- World War II Victory Medal
- ROCS Tai Yuan (Chinese: 太原; DE-27)
