= USS Oahu (PR-6) =

Gunboat of the United States Navy

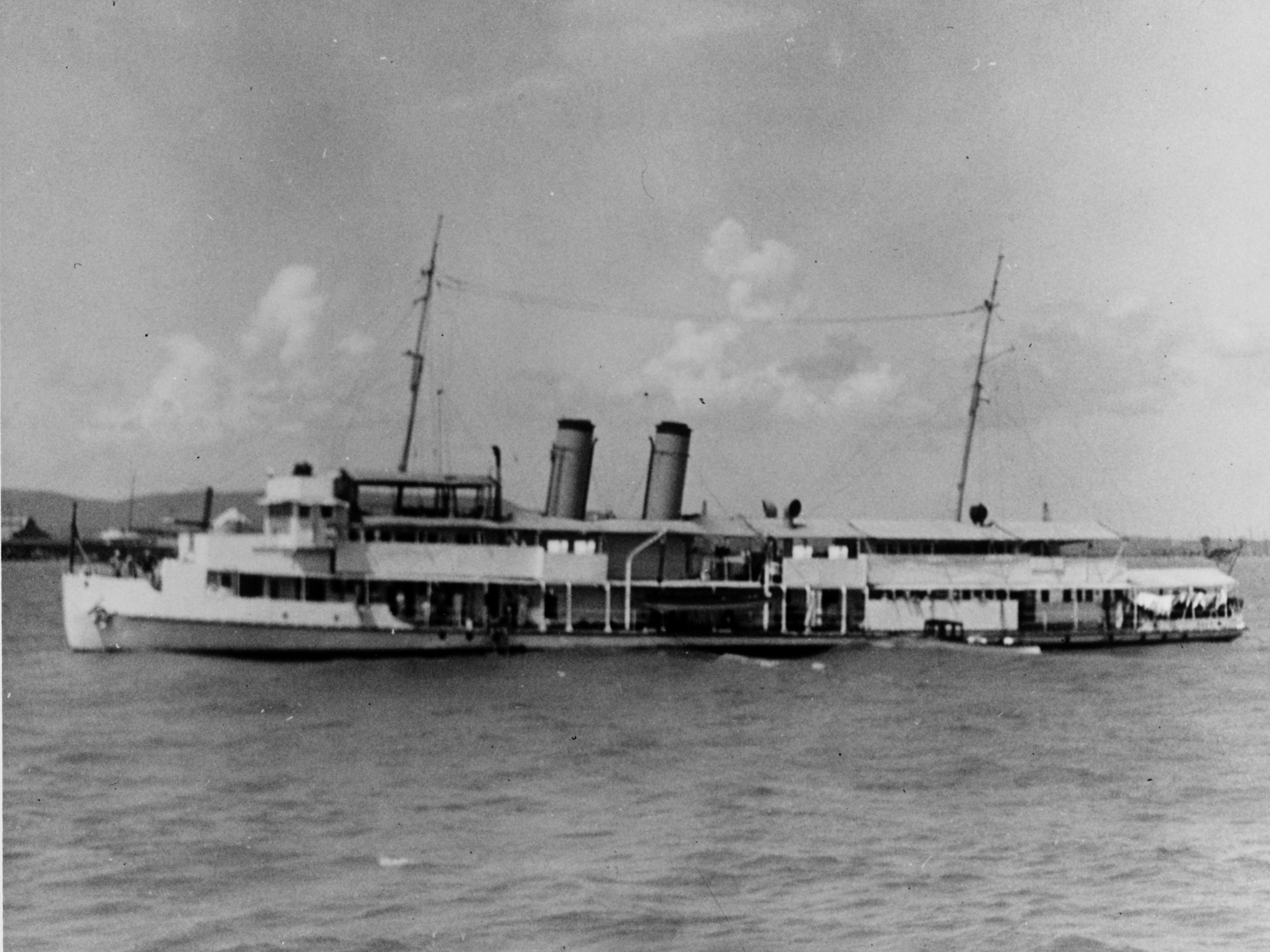

History

United States
- Name: USS Oahu
- Namesake: The island of Oahu in Hawaii
- Builder: Kiangnan Dock and Engineering Works
- Launched: 26 November 1927, as PG-46
- Commissioned: 22 October 1928, as PY-6
- Stricken: 8 May 1942
- Honours and awards: 1 battle star
- Fate: Sunk by enemy action, 5 May 1942

General characteristics
- Displacement: 450 long tons (460 t)
- Length: 191 ft (58 m)
- Beam: 28 ft 1 in (8.56 m)
- Draft: 5 ft 3 in (1.60 m)
- Propulsion: 1,900 hp triple expansion engines
- Speed: 15 knots (17 mph; 28 km/h)
- Complement: 55
- Armament: 2 × 3"/50 caliber gun; 8 × .30 cal (7.62 mm) machine guns

The first USS Oahu (PR-6), a Yangtze River gunboat, was laid down by Kiangnan Dock and Engineering Works, Shanghai, China, 18 December 1926; launched as PG–46 on 26 November 1927; sponsored by Mrs. Bryson Bruce, wife of Comdr. Bruce; and commissioned 22 October 1928.

== Service history ==
One of six river gunboats built for use on the Yangtze Kiang in south central China, Oahu departed Shanghai on her shakedown cruise 3 November 1928, proceeding upriver to Chongqing, 1,300 miles (2,100 km) inland, stopping at the open treaty ports en route and returning to Shanghai 2 June 1929. She then operated all along the Yangtze from the river's mouth to Chongqing and in the tributaries in protection of American lives and property into the 1930s. In the course of her service with the Yangtze Patrol Force, the gunboat convoyed American and foreign merchantmen up and down the river, supplied armed guards to U.S. and British river craft, landed bluejackets at treaty ports threatened by unrest and evacuated foreign nationals in times of danger.

Beginning in 1934, Oahu took up duty as station ship at various Yangtze ports supplying the increasing river traffic with naval armed guard detachments on a regular basis. Serving station ship duty at Yichang, Chongqing, Hankou, Wuhu, and Nanjing into 1937, the gunboat made intermittent patrols down the length of the river on convoy duty and then following the Japanese invasion of China in July, served as escort for merchantmen and protected American neutrality in the conflict. Following the sinking of sister gunboat Panay off Nanjing by Japanese planes 12 December 1937, Oahu picked up the survivors and carried them to Shanghai, returning to the scene of the incident to conduct salvage operations.

As the Japanese campaign in China grew, the gunboat operated only on the lower river as far as Wuhu and Hankou, in addition serving as station ship and radio relay vessel for American officials at the temporary U.S. embassy at Nanjing. Whenever the warship attempted to cruise the river on regular patrol, she was convoyed by Japanese minesweepers that kept watch on her movements while protecting her from attacks by their planes. Oahu remained as station ship at ports below Hankou, returning to the latter city to refit and give liberty to her crew until late in November 1941 and then, under orders of Commander, Asiatic Fleet departed Shanghai for the Philippines as signs of approaching war with Japan became clearer.

Following a long and difficult voyage across the South China Sea, the gunboat, never designed for open sea operations, arrived at Manila Bay in the week before the attack on Pearl Harbor. When war began, the warship operated in and around Manila Bay and Cavite Navy Yard on inshore patrol and in support of U.S.-Filipino forces on Bataan until after the fall of that peninsula 8 April 1942, and then continued to operate about the island fortress of Corregidor until sunk by enemy gunfire on 5 May. She was struck from the Navy List three days later.

On the night of 5 April, during the Battle of Bataan, the Mindanao and Oahu engaged the Japanese 21st Independent Engineer Regiment sailing south off Bataan's east coast, sinking several enemy craft.

Oahu, one of the last "old China hands", never actually voyaged to the U.S. She received one battle star for World War II service. She is sunk at the "tadpole's tail end" at Corregidor (in 20 feet of water). The only thing showing is the ship's railing. Everything else is buried in the very small coral gravel. She may have sunk and washed up in the bay at the end of the island, and slowly settled down into the sand and gravel and still lies there.

== Awards ==
- Yangtze Service Medal
- China Service Medal
- American Defense Service Medal with "FLEET" clasp
- Asiatic-Pacific Campaign Medal with one battle star
- World War II Victory Medal
- Philippine Presidential Unit Citation
- Philippine Defense Medal with star
