= Jiangnan Shipyard =

State-owned shipyard in Shanghai, China

Coordinates: 31.354114°N 121.737414°E

Jiangnan Shipyard (Group) Co., Ltd.
- Native name: 江南造船（集团）有限责任公司
- Company type: Subsidiary
- Industry: Shipbuilding
- Founded: 1865; 161 years ago
- Headquarters: Shanghai, China
- Area served: Worldwide
- Parent: China State Shipbuilding Corporation
- Website: jnshipyard.cssc.net.cn

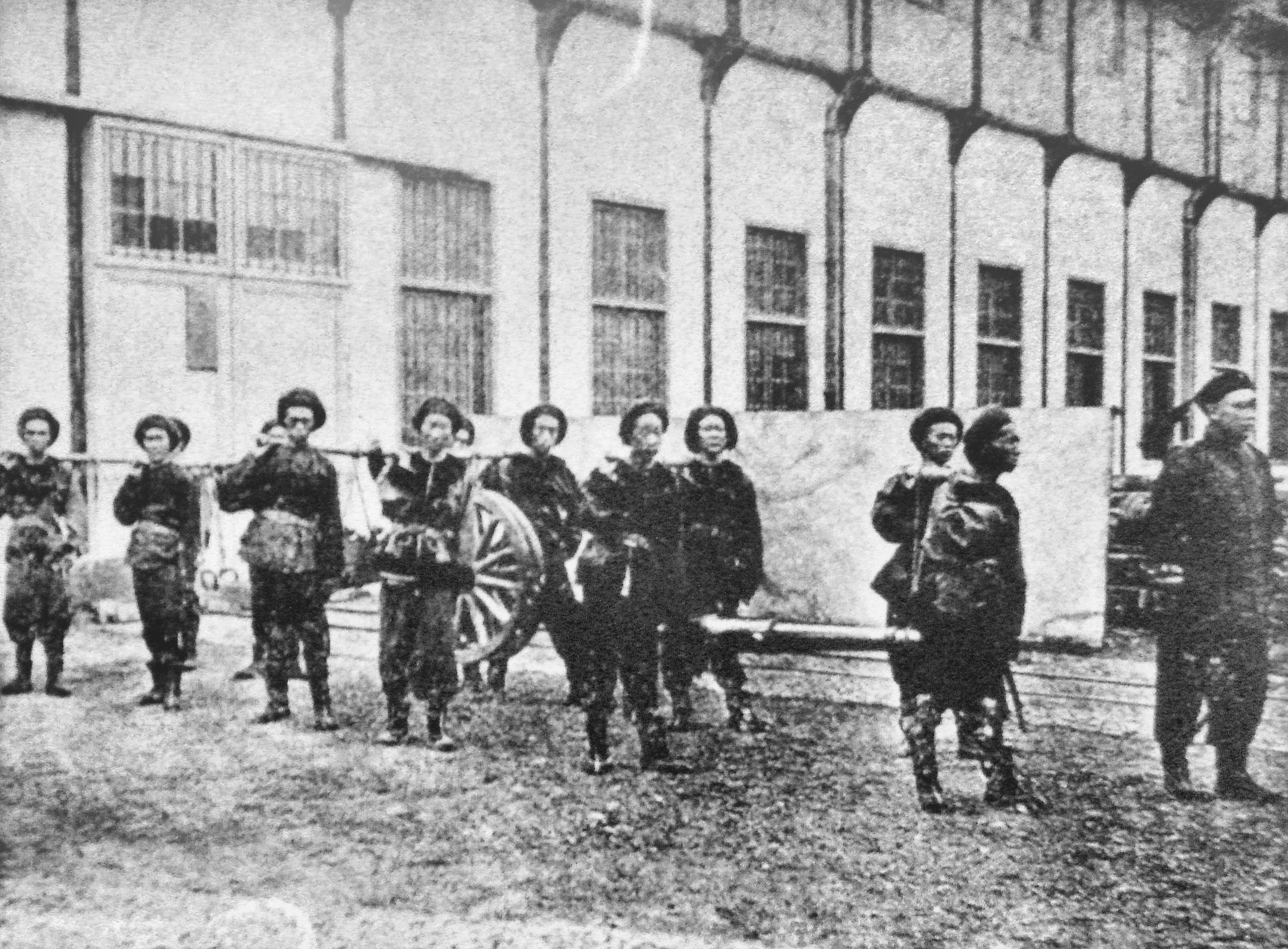
Gun transportation at Kiangnan Arsenal in Shanghai, during the Self-Strengthening Movement.

Jiangnan Shipyard (Chinese: 江南造船厂; pinyin: Jiāngnán Zàochuán Chǎng) is a historic shipyard in Shanghai, China. The shipyard has been state-owned since its founding in 1865 and is now operated as Jiangnan Shipyard (Group) Co. Ltd. One of the largest and most significant shipyards in China, Jiangan is also under the umbrella of the China State Shipbuilding Corporation (CSSC), the country's largest shipbuilder.

Established during the later Qing Dynasty, the shipyard has played a role in China's modernisation through successive periods of development. Previously based along the riverbank near Central Shanghai, in 2009 it relocated to Changxing Island in the mouth of the Yangtze River.

The shipyard is among the world's largest, specialising in LNG carriers, automated production, and advanced commercial vessels. It is also a major centre of naval production for China's PLA Navy, building a range of classes including the aircraft carrier Fujian.

== History ==
=== Kiangnan Arsenal ===
The origins of the Jiangnan Shipyard lie in the Self-Strengthening Movement of the late 19th century in China, during the Qing Dynasty. The Self-Strengthening Movement (Chinese: 洋務運動/自強運動/同治維新), c. 1861 – 1895, was a period of institutional reforms initiated in China during the late Qing dynasty following a series of military defeats and concessions to foreign powers. One of the projects in this campaign of modernisation was the establishment of defence industries, including the Kiangnan Arsenal in Shanghai in 1865 (the fourth year of the Tongzhi era). Plans for the arsenal were established under Zeng Guofan, who served as Viceroy of Liangjiang, although its actual establishment became the responsibilities of Li Hongzhang.

The Mandarin Chinese name of the Kiangnan Arsenal was the General Bureau of Machine Manufacture of Jiangnan (Chinese: 江南機器製造總局; pinyin: Jiāngnán Jīqì Zhìzào Zǒngjú), or the Jiangnan (or Kiangnan) Machine Works for short. It was established to both manufacture firearms and also build naval vessels. The shipyard, plant and machinery were initially leased from Thomas Hunt and Company, an American firm within the concessions of Shanghai. Due to the influx of workers and the reluctance of the concession authorities to allow arms to be manufactured within their territory, the Chinese authorities purchased the plant and equipment and combined these with the existing assets of the old Suzhou and Anqing arsenals as well as new equipment purchased by Yung Wing in the United States to form the new Kiangnan Arsenal in 1865.

The Kiangnan Arsenal was the largest of the arsenals established during the Self-Strengthening Movement, and also the one with the largest budget—from 1869, its annual budget was more than 400,000 silver taels. A series of high officials, including Zeng Guofan, Zuo Zongtang, and Zhang Zhidong, served as its head, although Li Hongzhang served the longest term during the Qing Dynasty. Most of the senior technical staff were Westerners, such as the first chief engineer, American T. F. Falls, and prolific translator John Fryer.

During the Tongzhi era, the Arsenal was the largest weapons factory in East Asia. Among its other achievements were the first domestically produced steam boat (the Huiji) in 1868 and the first domestically produced steel in 1891.

As well as its manufacturing works, the Arsenal also comprised a language school, a translation house and a technical school. It became forerunner of school training for foreign service civil servants.

=== Kiangnan Shipyard ===
In 1905, the shipbuilding operations of the Kiangnan Arsenal were de-merged into the separate Kiangnan Shipyard. In the 1920s Kiangnan built six new river gunboats for the US Navy South China Patrol on the Yangtze River.

The remaining arms manufacturing arm of the Kiangnan Arsenal operated until its dissolution in 1937, at the outbreak of the Second Sino-Japanese War. The shipyard was evacuated to Chongqing and re-established as the Chongqing Shipyard.

Large parts of the assets of both the Arsenal and the Shipyard were left behind in Shanghai to be occupied by Japanese forces during the war. During this period, the Japanese occupying forces absorbed the plant and equipment of the Arsenal into the Shipyard. This combination was not reversed after the surrender of Japan.

=== Jiangnan Shipyard after 1949 ===
New location of Jiangnan Shipyard - Changxingdao island

After the establishment of the People's Republic of China under the Chinese Communist Party in 1949, the shipyard changed its Chinese name to the Jiangnan Shipbuilding Factory (Chinese: 江南造船廠; pinyin: Jiāngnán Zàochuán Chǎng) in 1953. The shipyard was corporatised in 1996 and organised as a subsidiary of the state-owned China State Shipbuilding Corporation.

Beginning in 1964, the Communist government moved a number of industrial and technological institutions of strategic importance inland, in preparation for a potential war with either the United States or the Soviet Union. The Jiangnan Shipyard was again moved to Chongqing during this period. Although the shipyard subsequently moved back to Shanghai, it retains two subsidiary shipyards in Chongqing.

The Jiangnan Shipyard remained a focus of investment by the Chinese government during this period. Amongst other "firsts" in the People's Republic were the first ten-thousand-tonne hydraulic forging press, the first domestically designed ocean-going freight ship, the first ocean exploration and communication ship, the first liquid petroleum tanker, and the first sea-crossing train ferry.

The shipyard delivered China's first independently designed 10,000-tonne class ocean-going cargo ship Dongfeng in 1968.

In August 2000, the Qiuxin Shipyard became a wholly owned subsidiary, although its name and identity remain.

In 2010, the shipyard was requisitioned for Expo 2010. The shipyard's operations moved to Changxing Island, an island within Shanghai Municipality at the mouth of the Yangtze River.

== Ship building ==
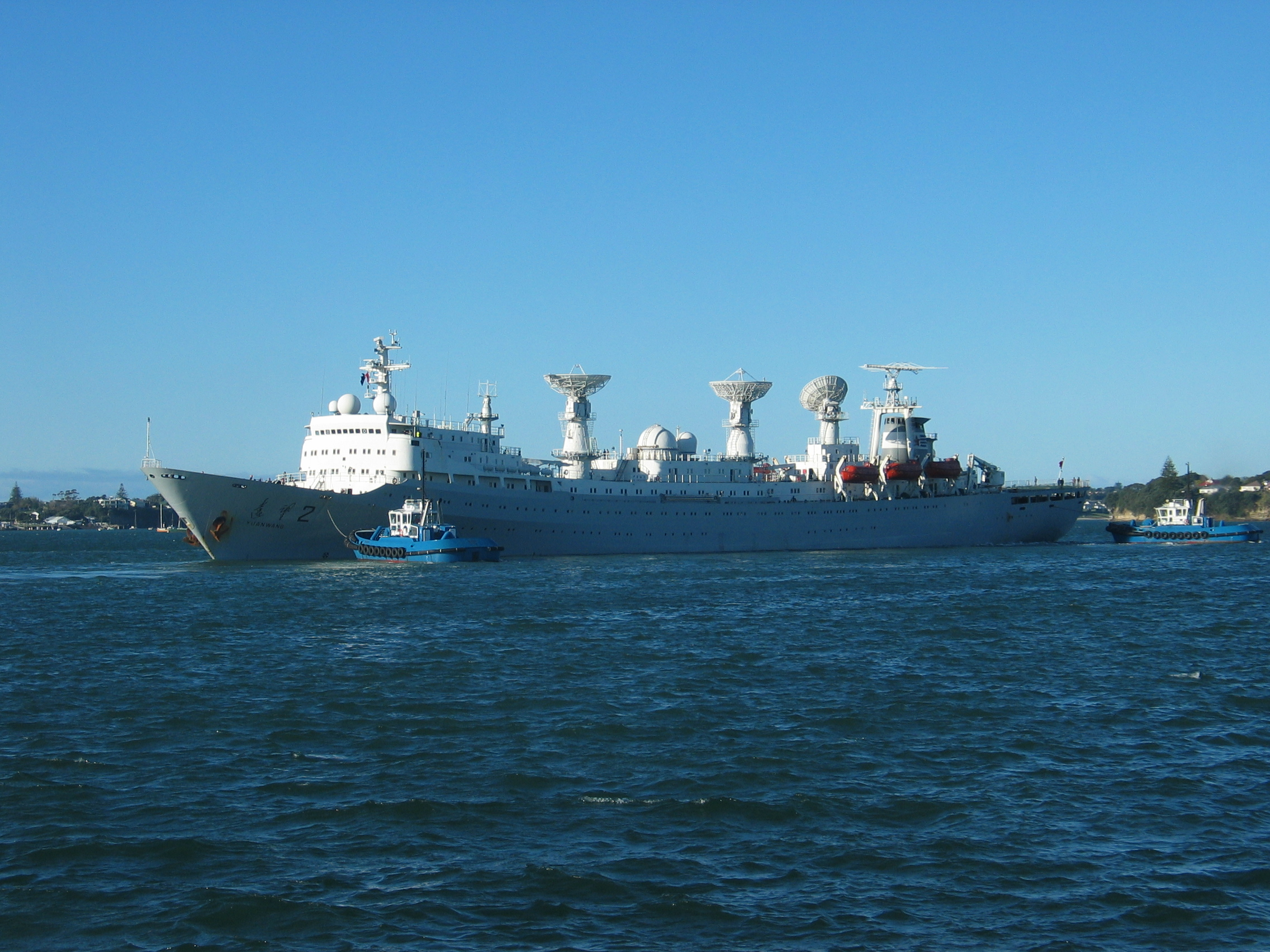
Yuan Wang 2 in Waitemata Harbour, Auckland, New Zealand

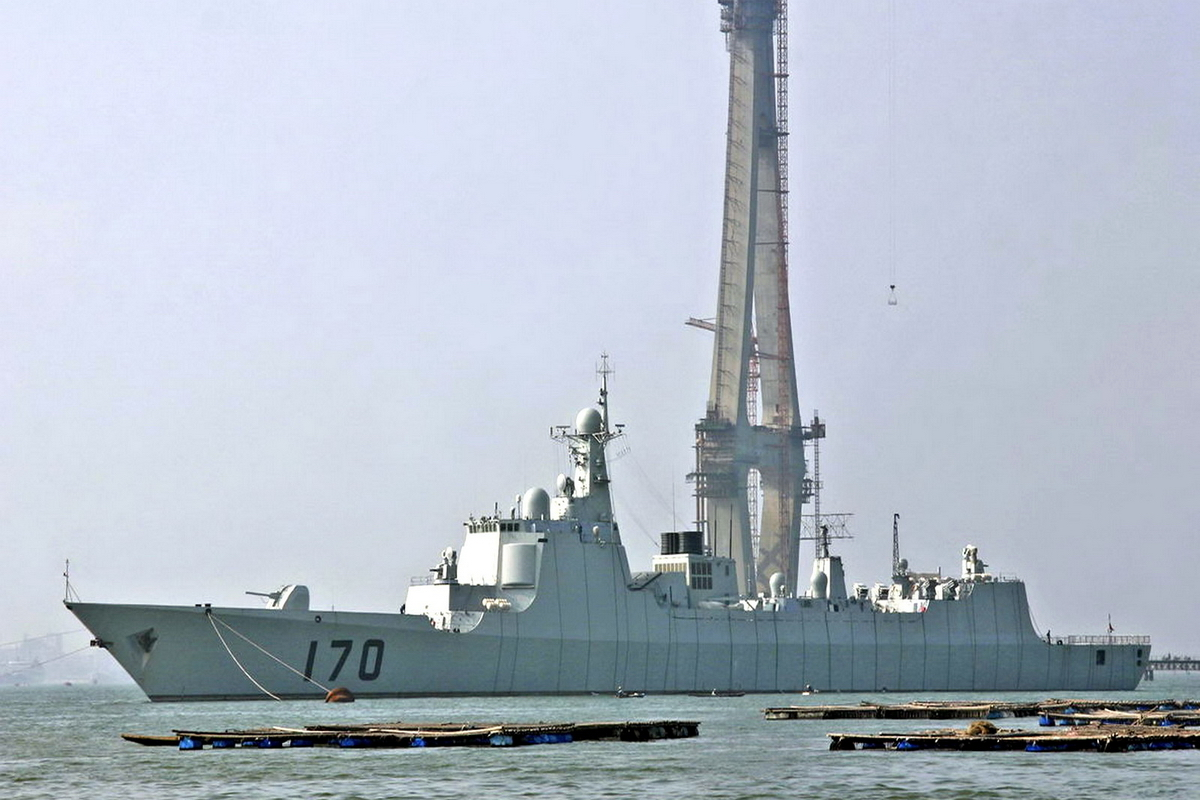
Lanzhou (170) of the Type 052C destroyer class

The shipyard main production is: liquefied gas carriers, car carriers, crude oil tankers, Panamax bulk carriers, Handymax bulk carriers, Lake suitable bulk carriers, multi-purpose cargo ships, and fast feeder container ships. The shipyard recently delivered 23,000 TEU LNG-fueled containership the CMA CGM Champs Elysées, but there was a delay of at least 10 months.

List of ships built in Jiangnan and Kiangnan Dockyard and Engineering Works:

- USS Tutuila (PR-4) 1926
- USS Oahu (PR-6) 1926
- USS Panay (PR-5) 1927
- Yuan Wang-class tracking ship
  - Yuan Wang 1 1977
  - Yuan Wang 2 1978
  - Yuan Wang 3 1995
  - Yuan Wang 7 2016
  - Yuan Wang 22 2013

== See also ==
- Chinese aircraft carrier programme
- Foochow Arsenal
- Great Hsi-Ku Arsenal
- Hanyang Arsenal
- Naval history of China
- Self-Strengthening Movement
- Taiyuan Arsenal
