= Yangtze Service Medal =

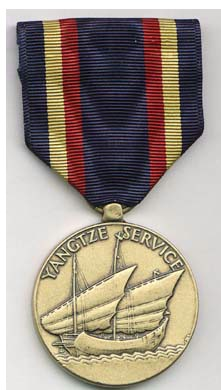
- Obverse
- Type: Medal
- Awarded for: Service on shore at Shanghai or in the valley of the Yangtze River between 3 September 1926 to 21 October 1927 and 1 March 1930 to 31 December 1932.
- Presented by: Department of the Navy
- Eligibility: Members of the US Navy and Marine Corps
- Status: Obsolete

The Yangtze Service Medal is a decoration of the United States military which was created in 1930 for presentation to members of the United States Navy and United States Marine Corps and was also issued to some US Army service personnel. The medal was awarded for service associated with operations in the Yangtze River Valley in China in 1926-1927 and 1930-1932.

== Eligibility ==
The Yangtze Service Medal is awarded for service by US Navy and Marine Corps personnel in the Yangtze River Valley between 3 September 1926 and 21 October 1927 and between 1 March 1930 and 31 December 1932; a period of significant unrest in the region during the Warlord Era. The decoration may also be awarded for those military service members who served on permanent duty in Shanghai, China, provided such service was in direct support of landing operations in the Yangtze River Valley (e.g. Nanking incident of 1927). Even if they qualified during both periods, personnel were only issued one medal. The US Army did not award separate campaign medals for soldiers serving in similar circumstances on these deployments but some US soldiers received the Department of the Navy's medal.

Later service in the area, from 1937 to 1939 was recognized by award of the China Service Medal.

The Yangtze Medal ranks in precedence after the Second Nicaraguan Campaign Medal and before the China Service Medal. It was authorized for issue by the Secretary of the Navy Charles Francis Adams III on 28 April 1930.

== Medal ==
The designer of the Yangtze Service Medal is John R. Sinnock of the Philadelphia Mint. The medal shows a Chinese junk under full sail below the words "Yangtze Service", the junk is similar but different to that used on the China Service Medal. The medal ribbon is blue with red, yellow and blue strips on the outer edges.

== See also ==
- Awards and decorations of the United States military
- Yangtze Patrol
