= USS Skipjack (SS-184) =

Submarine of the United States

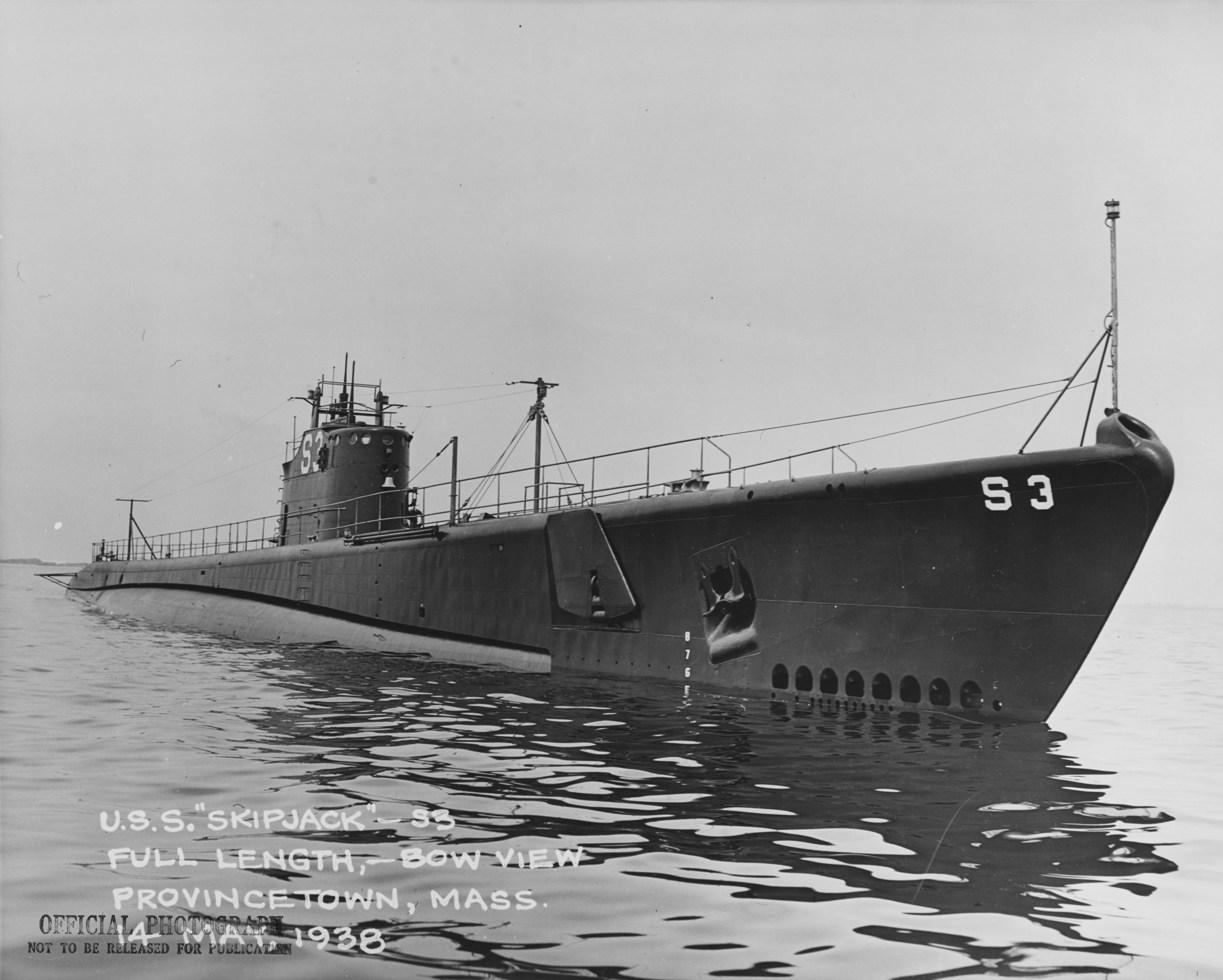
- USS Skipjack (SS-184) off Provincetown, Massachusetts, during sea trials, 14 May 1938

History

United States
- Name: Skipjack
- Builder: Electric Boat Company, Groton, Connecticut
- Laid down: 22 July 1936
- Launched: 23 October 1937
- Commissioned: 30 June 1938
- Decommissioned: 28 August 1946
- Stricken: 13 September 1948
- Fate: Sunk in Operation Crossroads atomic bomb test, 25 July 1946; raised 2 September 1946; sunk as a target off southern California, 11 August 1948

General characteristics
- Class & type: Salmon-class composite diesel-hydraulic and diesel-electric submarine
- Displacement: 1,435 long tons (1,458 t) standard, surfaced; 2,198 long tons (2,233 t) submerged
- Length: 308 ft 0 in (93.88 m)
- Beam: 26 ft 1 1/4 in (7.957 m)
- Draft: 15 ft 8 in (4.78 m)
- Propulsion: 4 × Hooven-Owens-Rentschler (H.O.R.) 9-cylinder diesel engines (two hydraulic-drive, two driving electrical generators); 2 × 120-cell batteries; 4 × high-speed Elliott electric motors with reduction gears; two shafts; 5,500 shp (4.1 MW) surfaced; 2,660 shp (2.0 MW) submerged
- Speed: 21 knots (39 km/h) surfaced; 9 knots (17 km/h) submerged
- Range: 11,000 nautical miles (20,000 km) at 10 knots (19 km/h)
- Endurance: 48 hours at 2 knots (3.7 km/h) submerged
- Test depth: 250 ft (76 m)
- Complement: 5 officers, 54 enlisted
- Armament: 8 × 21 inch (533 mm) torpedo tubes; (four forward, four aft); 24 torpedoes; 1 × 3 in (76 mm) / 50 caliber deck gun; four machine guns

USS Skipjack (SS-184), was a Salmon-class submarine, the second ship of the United States Navy to be named after the skipjack tuna. She earned multiple battle stars during World War II and then was sunk, remarkably, by an atomic bomb during post-World War II testing in Operation Crossroads. Among the most "thoroughly sunk" ships, she was refloated and then sunk a second time as a target ship two years later.

== Construction and commissioning ==
Skipjack′s keel was laid down by the Electric Boat Company in Groton, Connecticut, on 22 July 1936. She was launched on 23 October 1937, sponsored by Miss Frances Cuthbert Van Keuren, daughter of Captain Alexander H. Van Keuren, Superintending Constructor, New York Navy Yard. Skipjack was commissioned on 30 June 1938.

== Pre-World War II service ==
Following shakedown in the Atlantic Ocean and Caribbean Sea and post-shakedown repairs at New London, Connecticut, Skipjack was assigned to Submarine Squadron 6 (SubRon 6) and departed for fleet maneuvers in the Caribbean and South Atlantic. Following her return to New London on 10 April 1939, she sailed with sister ships Snapper and Salmon for the Pacific, transited the Panama Canal on 25 May, and arrived at San Diego, California, on 2 June. During July, she cruised to Pearl Harbor as part of SubRon 2; returned to San Diego on 16 August; and remained on the West Coast engaged in fleet tactics and training operations until 1 April 1940, when she again got underway for the Hawaiian area for training exercises there. Following her return to San Diego, Skipjack underwent overhaul at the Mare Island Navy Yard in Vallejo, California, and then proceeded back to Pearl Harbor, where she was attached to Rear Admiral Wilhelm L. Friedell's COMSUBPAC, Pacific Fleet, as a member of SubDiv 15 (commanded by Captain Ralph Christie). She operated out of Pearl Harbor until again undergoing overhaul at Mare Island in July and August 1941. Skipjack returned on 16 August and commenced patrols off Midway Island, Wake Island, and the Gilbert Islands and Marshall Islands. In October 1941, SubDiv 15 (then commanded by "Sunshine" Murray) was transferred to ComSubAsiatic Fleet, along with the tender Holland, and Joe Connolly's SubDiv 16, as SubRon 2. When the Japanese attacked Pearl Harbor on 7 December, Skipjack was in the Philippines undergoing repairs at the Cavite Navy Yard.

== First, Second and Third War Patrols ==
On 9 December, Skipjack (under the command of Charles L. Freeman) departed Manila on her first war patrol, with all unfinished repair work completed by her crew en route to the patrol area off the east coast of Samar. The submarine conducted two torpedo attacks during this patrol. On 25 December, in the first attack of its kind by a U.S. submarine, Skipjack attacked an enemy aircraft carrier and a destroyer. She followed prewar doctrine and fired three torpedoes on sonar bearings from a depth of 100 feet (30 m), without success. On 3 January 1942, three torpedoes were fired at an enemy submarine, resulting in two explosions, but a sinking could not be confirmed. She refueled at Balikpapan, Borneo, on 4 January and arrived at Port Darwin, Australia, for refit on 14 January.

Skipjack's second war patrol, conducted in the Celebes Sea, was uneventful with the exception of an unsuccessful attack on a Japanese aircraft carrier. She returned to Fremantle, Western Australia, on 10 March 1942. On 14 April, Skipjack got underway under the command of James W. Coe for her third war patrol, conducted in the Celebes Sea, Sulu Sea, and South China Sea. On 6 May, contact was made with a Japanese cargo ship, and the submarine moved in for the kill. Finding herself almost dead ahead, Skipjack fired a "down the throat" spread of three torpedoes that sank Kanan Maru (Japanese: 河南丸). Two days later, the submarine intercepted a three-ship convoy escorted by a destroyer and she fired two torpedoes that severely damaged the merchant ship, Taiyu Maru (Japanese: 大有丸). Then she let go with four more that quickly sank the cargo ship, Bujun Maru (Japanese: 撫順丸). On 17 May, Skipjack sank the passenger-cargo ship Tazan Maru (Japanese: 太山丸) off Indochina before heading back to Fremantle.

== Fourth through Ninth War Patrols ==
Following participation in performance tests for the Mark 14 torpedo, Skipjack sailed for her fourth war patrol on 18 July 1942, conducted along the northwest coast of Timor which she reconnoitered and photographed. She also severely damaged an enemy oiler. The submarine returned to Fremantle for refit on 4 September.

Skipjack's fifth war patrol was conducted off Timor Island, Amboina, and Halmahera. On 14 October, while patrolling south of the Palau Islands, the submarine torpedoed and sank the 6,781-ton cargo ship, Shunko Maru (Japanese: 春光丸). Following a depth charge attack by a Japanese destroyer, the submarine returned to Pearl Harbor on 26 November. At this point, Commander Coe was reassigned to take command of the soon to be commissioned USS Cisco (SS-290).

Skipjack's sixth, seventh, and eighth war patrols were unproductive. But, during her ninth, conducted in the Caroline Islands and Mariana Islands areas, she sank two enemy vessels. On 26 January 1944, she commenced a night attack on a merchant ship, but, prior to firing, she shifted targets when an enemy destroyer began a run on the submarine. She quickly fired her forward torpedoes and was rewarded with solid hits that quickly sank Suzukaze (Japanese: 涼風). The submarine then fired her stern tubes at the merchant ship. One of the submarine's torpedo tube valves stuck open and her after torpedo room began to flood. The torpedomen were unable to close the emergency valves until she had taken on approximately 14 tons of water. A large upward angle developed almost immediately, forcing the submarine to surface. By the time control of the boat had been regained, the water in the torpedo room was only a few inches from the top of the water tight door, but fortunately there were no casualties, and Skipjack resumed the attack. The submarine then torpedoed and sank the converted seaplane tender Okitsu Maru (Japanese: 興津丸). She returned to Pearl Harbor on 7 March.

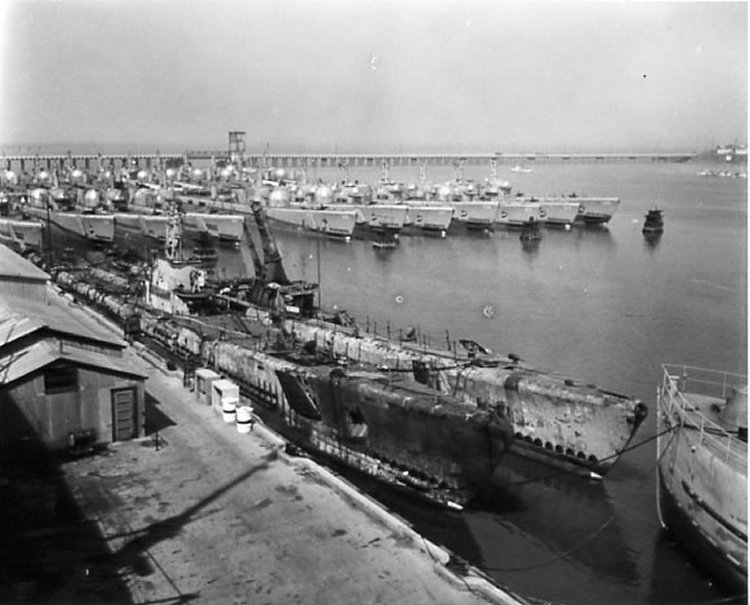
Skipjack (inboard) and Skate at the Pacific Reserve Fleet Mare Island in October 1947

== Tenth War Patrol ==
Following repairs, Skipjack participated in performance tests on new torpedoes in cold water off the Pribilof Islands until 17 April and then headed for the Mare Island Navy Yard and overhaul. After returning to Pearl Harbor, Skipjack got underway for her tenth and final war patrol, conducted in the Kuril Islands area. During this patrol, she damaged an enemy auxiliary and attacked a Japanese destroyer without success.

== Late war ==
On 11 December 1944, she returned to Midway Island and then continued on to Ulithi. She then sailed to Pearl Harbor for refit, and got underway on 1 June 1945 for New London, Connecticut, and duty training submarine school students.

== Fate ==
Skipjack was later sunk as a target vessel in the second atomic bomb test at Bikini Atoll in July 1946 and was later raised and towed to Mare Island. On 11 August 1948, she was again sunk as a target by aircraft rockets off the coast of California. Her name was stricken from the Naval Vessel Register on 13 September 1948.

== Awards ==
- Asiatic-Pacific Campaign Medal with seven battle stars for World War II servic
