= USS Salmon (SS-182) =

Submarine of the United States

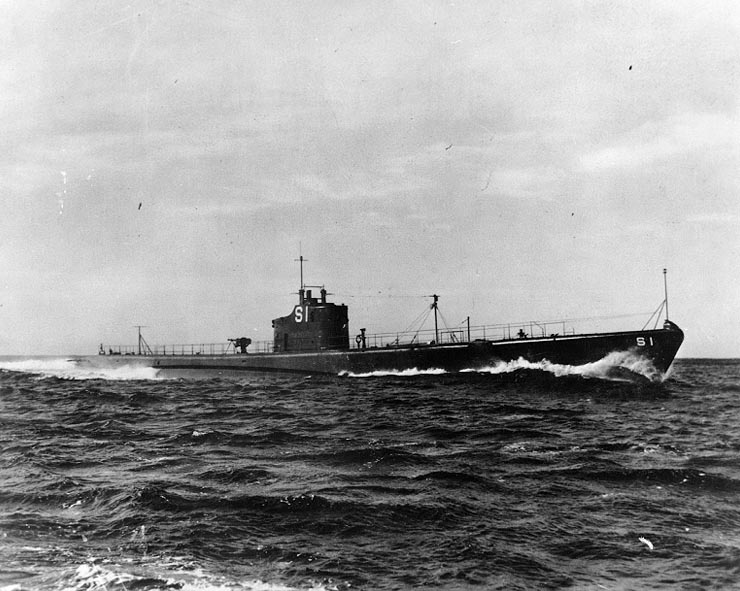
- USS Salmon (SS-182)

History

United States
- Builder: Electric Boat Company, Groton, Connecticut
- Laid down: 15 April 1936
- Launched: 12 June 1937
- Commissioned: 15 March 1938
- Decommissioned: 24 September 1945
- Stricken: 11 October 1945
- Fate: Constructive loss due to battle damage; broken up for scrap, 1946

General characteristics
- Class & type: Salmon-class composite diesel-hydraulic and diesel-electric submarine
- Displacement: 1,435 long tons (1,458 t) standard, surfaced; 2,198 long tons (2,233 t) submerged
- Length: 308 ft 0 in (93.88 m)
- Beam: 26 ft 1 1/4 in (7.957 m)
- Draft: 15 ft 8 in (4.78 m)
- Propulsion: 4 × Hooven-Owens-Rentschler (H.O.R.) 9-cylinder diesel engines (two hydraulic-drive, two driving electrical generators); 2 × 120-cell batteries; 4 × high-speed Elliott electric motors with reduction gears; two shafts; 5,500 shp (4.1 MW) surfaced; 2,660 shp (2.0 MW) submerged
- Speed: 21 knots (39 km/h) surfaced; 9 knots (17 km/h) submerged
- Range: 11,000 nautical miles (20,000 km) at 10 knots (19 km/h)
- Endurance: 48 hours at 2 knots (3.7 km/h) submerged
- Test depth: 250 ft (76 m)
- Complement: 5 officers, 54 enlisted
- Armament: 8 × 21-inch (533 mm) torpedo tubes; (four forward, four aft); 24 torpedoes; 1 × 3 in (76 mm) / 50 caliber deck gun; four machine guns

USS Salmon (SS-182) was the lead ship of her class of submarine. She was the second ship of the United States Navy to be named for the salmon.

== Construction and commissioning ==
Salmon′s keel was laid down on 15 April 1936 by the Electric Boat Company in Groton, Connecticut. She was launched on 12 June 1937, sponsored by Miss Hester Laning, daughter of Rear Admiral Harris Laning, Commandant of the 3rd Naval District and New York Navy Yard. Salmon was commissioned on 15 March 1938.

== 1939–1941 ==
After shakedown training and trials along the Atlantic coast from the West Indies to Nova Scotia, Salmon joined Submarine Division 15, Squadron 6 of the Submarine Force, U.S. Fleet, at Portsmouth, New Hampshire. As flagship of her division, she operated along the Atlantic coast until she relinquished the flag to sister ship Snapper late in 1939 as the division was shifted to the West Coast at San Diego.

Salmon operated along the West Coast through 1940 and the greater portion of 1941. Late that year, she was transferred with her division and the submarine tender Holland, to the Asiatic station. On 18 November, Holland with Salmon, Swordfish, Sturgeon, and Skipjack arrived at Manila and formed SubDiv 21 of the Asiatic fleet to bolster defenses in the Philippines as marked tension was growing due to Japanese militarism.

== World War II ==
Salmon was conducting a patrol from Manila, Philippines, along the west coast of Luzon at the time of the surprise air raid by the Japanese against the Philippine bases and Pearl Harbor. Having been on defensive deployment since 27 November, in a wait-and-watch posture, she commenced war patrolling immediately upon receiving word of the attacks. On 22 December, while on the surface in Lingayen Gulf, she encountered two Japanese destroyers and pressed home an attack which seemed to bewilder the reluctant enemy. She succeeded in damaging both targets by delivering a "down the throat" spread of torpedoes which caught them as they veered course in opposite directions. She then was able to avoid further contact by ducking into a rain squall.

=== 1942 ===
In January 1942, she moved south to operate in the Gulf of Davao and off the southern tip of Mindanao and thence proceeded to Manipa Strait between Bura and Ceram in the Molucca Islands. In February, she patrolled the Flores Sea from north of Timor to Lombok Strait in the Sunda Islands, then put into Tjilatjap on the south coast of Java on 13 February.

The capture of the airfield on Bali on 18 February 1942 and the losses suffered by American-British-Dutch-Australian Command (ABDA) forces in the battle of Badung Strait on 20 February forced the abandonment of the ABDA base at Surabaya and exposed Tjilatjap to a possible trap. The tender Holland moved her base of operations to Exmouth Gulf, Australia, on 20 February, as Salmon set out on her second war patrol.

Salmon spent the next month in the Java Sea on patrol between Sepandjang and the area just west of Bawean. She arrived at Fremantle, Australia, on 23 March to end her second patrol.

Beginning her third war patrol, Salmon departed from Fremantle on 3 May and established a barrier patrol along the south coast of Java to intercept Japanese shipping. On 3 May, she torpedoed and sank the 11,441-ton repair ship Asahi. On 28 May, the 4,382-ton passenger-cargo vessel Ganges Maru was torpedoed by her as well. On 24 June, Salmon returned to Fremantle and commenced preparations for her next patrol.

Salmon departed Fremantle on 21 July for her fourth war patrol in the South China Sea–Sulu Sea area. Sailing via Lombok and Makassar Straits, the Sibutu Passage, and the Balabac Strait, she stationed herself between North Borneo and Palawan, Philippine Islands. During this patrol, Salmon was unable to gain a favorable position for successful attack, but made numerous sightings and reports of shipping movements to sister subs in the vicinity. She returned to Fremantle on 8 September.

Salmon's fifth war patrol began on 10 October, and her area of operations was off Corregidor and Subic Bay. On the night of 10 November, she challenged a large sampan moving in the vicinity of Subic Bay during the hours of darkness. After ignoring the challenge, the vessel was ordered to stop and shots were fired across its bow. Salmon then maneuvered for a closer inspection and saw that the sampan was displaying rising-sun emblems on her deckhouse and her crew was attempting to jettison objects over the side. Salmon's crew fired at her with .50-caliber (12.7 mm) machine guns. The vessel stopped and was boarded by Salmon crewmen who found that most of the Japanese sailors had gone over the side. They removed papers, radio equipment, and other articles, then set the sampan afire. As Salmon pulled away, the enemy vessel was seen to explode and sink.

On 17 November, off the approach to Manila Bay, Salmon sighted three vessels and maneuvered for attack. She fired torpedoes at each of the ships and succeeded in damaging two and sinking the 5,873-ton, converted salvage vessel, Oregon Maru. Salmon ended her fifth patrol on 7 December at Pearl Harbor. She then proceeded to Mare Island Naval Shipyard, California, the following day, and arrived on 13 December. Salmon remained at Mare Island until on 30 March 1943, undergoing alterations including the installation of new radar equipment and two 20 mm mounts to augment her firepower. She returned to Pearl Harbor on 8 April.

=== 1943 ===
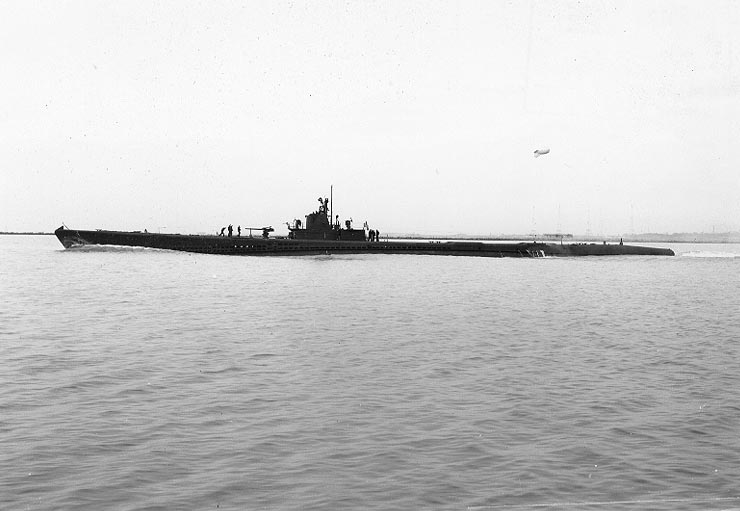
Salmon, 22 March 1943

Salmon departed from Pearl Harbor on 29 April 1943 for her sixth war patrol via Midway Island. She was assigned a special mission which took her to the coast of Honshū, Japan, at Hachijo-jima, Kajitorizaki (Kii Peninsula), and Izu Ōshima. During this mission, she damaged two freighters on 3 June and returned to Midway Island on 19 June.

Salmon's seventh patrol was conducted in the Kuril Islands to cut the Paramushiro-Aleutian supply route. She departed from Midway Island on 17 July; sank a small coastal patrol vessel on 9 August, and, on 10 August sank the 2,411-ton passenger-cargo vessel, Wakanoura Maru off the northern coast of Hokkaidō. She returned to Pearl Harbor on 25 August.

Salmon's eighth war patrol saw her return to the Kuril Islands where she was credited with damaging two freighters. This patrol lasted from 27 September to 17 November when she returned to Pearl Harbor.

=== 1944 ===
The ninth war patrol for Salmon was conducted between 15 December and on 25 February 1944. She succeeded in damaging one freighter on 22 January.

On 1 April, Salmon departed from Pearl Harbor en route to Johnston Island in company with the submarine Seadragon. She was assigned a special photo reconnaissance mission for her tenth patrol which would assist in preparing plans for gaining control of the Caroline Islands. She conducted a reconnaissance of Ulithi from 15 to 20 April; Yap from 22 to 26 April; and Woleai between 28 April and 9 May. She returned to Pearl Harbor on 21 May with much valuable information that was utilized in last-minute changes to the assault plans.

Salmon's eleventh and last war patrol was conducted in company with submarines Trigger and Sterlet as a coordinated attack group in the Ryukyu Islands. This patrol began on 24 September. On 30 October, Salmon attacked a large tanker that had been previously damaged by Trigger. This tanker was protected by four antisubmarine patrol vessels which were cruising back and forth around the stricken ship. Salmon fired four torpedoes and made two good hits, but was forced to dive deep under a severe depth charge attack by escort CD-29. She leveled off at 300 feet (91 m) but was soon forced to nearly 500 feet (150 m) due to damage and additional pounding of the depth charges. Unable to control leaking and maintain depth level, she battle-surfaced to fight for survival on the surface.

Escorts CD-22 (who sunk USS Harder) and CD-33 (which would later help sink Trigger on 28 March 1945) saw her surface and began to close. Salmon turned away to give her crew a few precious minutes to correct a bad list and to repair some of the damage. The vessels began to close, but Salmon showed an aggressive stance, turned on the attackers and passing within 50 yards (46 m) down the side of CD-22, raked her with 20 mm gunfire and her deck gun. CD-22 suffered 4 killed and 24 wounded and was unable to reply because of the closeness of Salmon and her higher freeboard. Salmon began sending out plain language directions for all other subs in the vicinity to attack, giving the position of the action. This probably further discouraged the enemy who, fearing other submarines in the area, began milling around pinging on sound gear. Salmon took advantage of a rain squall and slipped away.

Other than the damage caused by depth charges, Salmon suffered only a few small-caliber hits from the enemy vessels. Escorted by Sterlet, Trigger, and Silversides, she made it to Saipan. She was given one-third credit for the 10,500-ton tanker, Jinei Maru which was eventually sunk by a torpedo from Sterlet. On 3 November, she moored alongside submarine tender Fulton, in Tanapag Harbor, Saipan.

=== 1945 ===
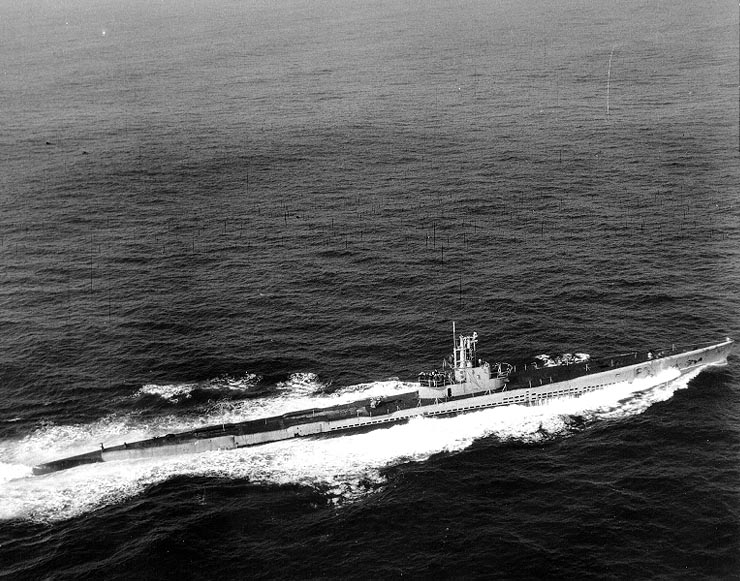
Salmon, February 1945

On 10 November, Salmon stood out from Saipan, in company with Holland, and sailed via Eniwetok and Pearl Harbor to San Francisco. On 26 January 1945, she departed from San Francisco with the submarine Redfish and proceeded via the Panama Canal to Portsmouth, New Hampshire, where she arrived on 17 February.

After repairs and overhaul at the Portsmouth Navy Yard, Salmon was assigned as a training vessel for the Atlantic Fleet. After the war's end, Salmon was slated for disposal and was decommissioned on 24 September. Struck from the Naval Vessel Register on 11 October, she was scrapped on 4 April 1946. Her conning tower was used as the caisson for the Baker test during Operation Crossroads.

== Awards ==
- Presidential Unit Citation
- American Defense Service Medal
- Asiatic-Pacific Campaign Medal with nine battle stars for World War II service
- World War II Victory Medal
- Philippine Defense Medal with star

Salmon was awarded the Presidential Unit Citation for extraordinary heroism against enemy surface vessels during her eleventh war patrol in restricted, enemy-held waters of the Pacific.
