= Salmon-class submarine =

US Navy submarine class of World War II

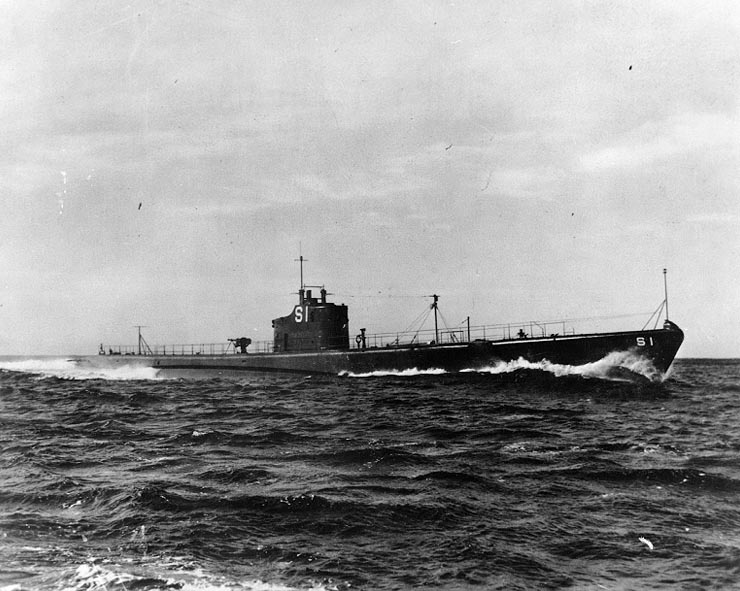
- USS Salmon on trials in 1938

Class overview
- Builders: Electric Boat Company, Portsmouth Naval Shipyard, Mare Island Naval Shipyard
- Operators: United States Navy
- Preceded by: Porpoise class
- Succeeded by: Sargo class
- Built: 1936–1938
- In commission: 1937–1946
- Completed: 6
- Retired: 6

General characteristics
- Type: Composite (direct and diesel-electric) drive fleet submarine
- Displacement: 1,435 long tons (1,458 t) standard, surfaced; 2,198 long tons (2,233 t) submerged
- Length: 308 ft (94 m)
- Beam: 26 ft 1.25 in (7.96 m)
- Draft: 15 ft 8 in (4.78 m)
- Propulsion: 4 × General Motors-Winton or Hooven-Owens-Rentschler (H.O.R.) diesel engines (two direct drive, two driving electrical generators), 1,535 hp (1,145 kW) each; 2 × 120-cell batteries; 4 × high-speed Elliott geared electric motors, 665 hp (496 kW) each; 2 × auxiliary diesel generators, 330 kW (440 hp) each; 2 shafts; Net 5,500 hp (4,100 kW) surfaced; 2,660 hp (1,980 kW) submerged
- Speed: 21 knots (39 km/h) surfaced; 9 knots (17 km/h) submerged
- Range: 11,000 nautical miles (20,000 km) at 10 knots (19 km/h)
- Endurance: 48 hours at 2 knots (3.7 km/h) submerged
- Test depth: 250 ft (76 m)
- Complement: 5 officers, 54 enlisted
- Armament: 8 × 21 inch (533 mm) torpedo tubes; (four forward, four aft); 24 torpedoes; 1 × 3 inch (76 mm)/50 caliber deck gun; four machine guns

The United States Navy Salmon-class submarines were an important developmental step in the design of the "fleet submarine" concept during the 1930s. An incremental improvement over the previous Porpoise class, they were the first US submarine class to achieve 21 knots with a reliable propulsion plant, allowing them to operate with the Standard-type battleships of the surface fleet. Also, their 11,000 nautical miles (20,000 km) unrefueled range would allow them to operate in Japanese home waters. These rugged and dependable boats provided yeoman service during World War II, along with their immediate successors, the similar Sargo class. In some references, the Salmons and Sargos are called the "New S Class", 1st and 2nd Groups.

== Design ==
Authorized under the Fiscal Year 1936 provision of the Vinson-Trammell Act, two distinct, but very similar, designs were developed, to be built by three different constructors. The Electric Boat Company of Groton, Connecticut designed and built Salmon, Seal, and Skipjack (SS-182 to 184). The Navy's lead submarine design entity, the Portsmouth Naval Shipyard of Kittery, Maine submitted a design for the Government group, which became Snapper and Stingray (SS-185 & 186). Using the Portsmouth plans and acting as a follow yard, the Mare Island Naval Shipyard of Vallejo, California built Sturgeon (SS-187). The two designs differed in minor details such as the locations of the access hatches for the forward engine room and crew's quarters, the shape of the horizontal conning tower cylinder, and, most significantly, the closure of the main induction valve. This difference led to casualties in Snapper and Sturgeon, and to the loss of Squalus. Larger than the design of the Porpoise-class, the conning tower installed by Electric Boat had two concave spherical ends, The Portsmouth design had a concave end aft and a convex one forward. Portsmouth and Mare Island ran into production difficulties with their conning towers, discovering cracks that caused the cylinder to fail the required pressure test. The problem was successfully fixed, but the experience caused the government yards to adopt the double concave design for the next several years.

Externally, there were minor differences in the shape of the upper edge of the aft end of the conning tower fairwater. The Electric Boat design had a gradual downward taper to this bulwark, the Government design was slightly higher and straighter. Also, as built the Electric Boat trio had two 34 foot periscopes. This resulted in a fairly small periscope shear support structure above the fairwater. The three Government boats had one 34 foot and one 40 foot periscope and this necessitated a taller shear and support stanchions.

The Electric Boat-built Porpoises had been built to an all-welded design. Conservative engineers and shipfitters at the Government yards stuck with tried and true riveting. Electric Boat's method proved superior, providing a stronger and tighter boat, as well as preventing leakage of fuel oil tanks after depth charge attacks. Finally convinced of the efficacy of Electric Boat's innovation, Government yards finally converted wholesale to welding for their three Salmons and the Navy was entirely happy with the results.

The six boats of this class were straight forward derivations of the later boats of the preceding Porpoise class. Although considered to be successful in most respects, valuable lessons had been learned from the Porpoises and operating experience showed the need to expand the operating envelope. The Salmons were longer, heavier, and faster versions with a better internal arrangement and a heavier armament. Two additional torpedo tubes were added to the aft torpedo room, for a total of four forward and four aft. The development of the Torpedo Data Computer, making broadside attacks practical, had made stern tubes more desirable. Some submariners wanted six tubes forward, but design philosophy and tactics of the day did not yet support this; additionally, for years the tonnage required to provide the extra tubes was over-estimated. However, in an effort to increase the number of torpedoes carried, four non-firing torpedo stowage tubes were installed in the superstructure below the main deck, stacked vertically, two each on either side of the conning tower. In order to access the weapons in these tubes, the boat had to surface and remove a portion of the decking on either side of the deck gun. Small boats stowed there for running sailors ashore for liberty were removed and set in the water. The weapons were extracted from the tubes one by one and winched up to the main deck. They were then placed on a raised loading skid and carefully lowered on an angle through a hatch into the forward torpedo room. This whole process took several hours to complete. The impracticality of spending several hours on the surface in enemy waters moving torpedoes below was lost on the designers. War experience led to the removal of these tubes during the boats' first wartime overhauls.

Two different main (diesel) engine types were installed in these boats during construction. The Government boats received a new model GM-Winton 16-248 V16. Steady development work by GM-Winton had largely corrected earlier problems and this engine proved to be fairly reliable and rugged. The three Electric Boat units received a nine-cylinder version of the Hooven-Owens-Rentschler (HOR) double-acting engine. This was based on a successful steam engine design. Having a power stroke in both directions of the piston, this engine promised nearly twice the horsepower in a size similar to a conventional in-line or V-type engine. Unfortunately, HOR encountered severe design and manufacturing difficulties converting the concept to internal combustion. They vibrated excessively due to imbalances in the combustion chambers. This broke engine mounts and caused difficulties in the drive train. Improper manufacture of the gearing resulted in broken gear teeth. Reluctant to give up on the promise of the engine, the Navy coddled the HORs along until after the United States entered the Pacific War following the attack on Pearl Harbor, when increased funding and operational needs caused these engines to be replaced with GM-Winton 16-278As during the boat's first wartime overhauls.

Serious problems were encountered with the Porpoise-class' diesel-electric drive. This drove the decision to radically alter the propulsion plant. The Salmons were fitted with a so-called "composite drive". In this arrangement, two main engines in the forward engine room drove generators in the fashion set by the Porpoises. In the after engine room, two side-by-side engines were clutched to reduction gears which sat forward of the engines, with vibration-isolating hydraulic clutches. The propeller shafts led aft from each of the reduction gears, and were sited outboard of the engines. Two high-speed electric motors were mounted outboard of each shaft, connected directly to the reduction gears. For surfaced operation the engines were clutched in to the reduction gears and drove the propellers directly, with the generator engines providing additional voltage to the motors. For submerged operation, the direct drive engines were declutched from the reduction gears and the motors drove the shafts with electricity supplied by the batteries. Since World War I the US Navy had sought a 21-knot fleet submarine to maneuver with the Standard-type battleships. The first attempts, with the AA-1 class and the Barracuda-class "V-boats" in the 1920s, were failures due to unreliable engines. The Salmons were the first US submarine class to achieve the desired speed of 21 knots with a reliable propulsion plant. However, this unusual arrangement was quite cramped, making maintenance and repairs in the aft engine room somewhat difficult.

All six of these submarines (and all subsequent U.S. Navy submarines up to the late 1940s) were built to a "partial-double hull" design. In this hull type, the inner pressure resisting hull is wrapped by an outer hydrodynamically smooth hull. The space between these two hulls is used for ballast and fuel tanks. The outer hull smoothly tapers into the pressure hull in the area of the forward and after torpedo room bulkheads, leaving the pressure hull exposed at the extreme ends of the boat. This is actually an advantage as it allows access to the pressure hull in these areas for maintenance. In a full double hull boat, the outer hull completely encompasses the pressure hull and the very narrow ends make it very hard to reach the pressure hull for repairs and maintenance.

== Boats in class ==
Construction data
Name	Hull no.	Builder	Laid down	Launched	Commissioned	Decommissioned	Fate
Salmon	SS-182	Electric Boat	15 April 1936	12 June 1937	15 March 1938	24 September 1945	Scrapped 1946
Seal	SS-183	Electric Boat	25 May 1936	25 April 1937	30 April 1938	15 November 1945	Reserve training ship; scrapped 1956
Skipjack	SS-184	Electric Boat	22 July 1936	23 October 1937	30 June 1938	28 August 1946	Sunk as nuclear testing target July 1946, raised and expended as target August 1948
Snapper	SS-185	Portsmouth Navy Yard	23 July 1936	24 August 1937	15 December 1937	17 November 1945	Scrapped 1948
Stingray	SS-186	Portsmouth Navy Yard	1 October 1936	6 October 1937	15 March 1938	17 October 1945	Scrapped 1946
Sturgeon	SS-187	Mare Island Navy Yard	27 October 1936	15 March 1938	25 June 1938	15 November 1945	Scrapped 1948

== Service history ==
=== Commissioning and pre-war service ===
Portsmouth proved to be quite efficient in their production methods and they managed to complete and commission both Snapper and Stingray before Electric Boat delivered the lead boat Salmon for commissioning. In fact, all three of the Government built boats of this class beat their commercially built counterparts into service.

After commissioning, these boats were very active in the fleet, operating initially with the Atlantic Fleet, conducting exercises in the Caribbean and around both sides of the Panama Canal. They transferred to the Pacific Fleet in late 1939, homeported out of San Diego, commanded by COMSUBPAC Admiral Wilhelm L. Friedell. In October 1941, as war clouds loomed on the horizon, all the Salmons and most other newer available submarines were transferred to the Asiatic Fleet as part of a belated effort to reinforce U.S. and Allied forces in the Philippines. The Japanese occupation of southern Indo-China and the August 1941 American-British-Dutch retaliatory oil embargo had raised international tensions. They operated out of Cavite in Manila Bay until the war commenced.

=== World War II ===
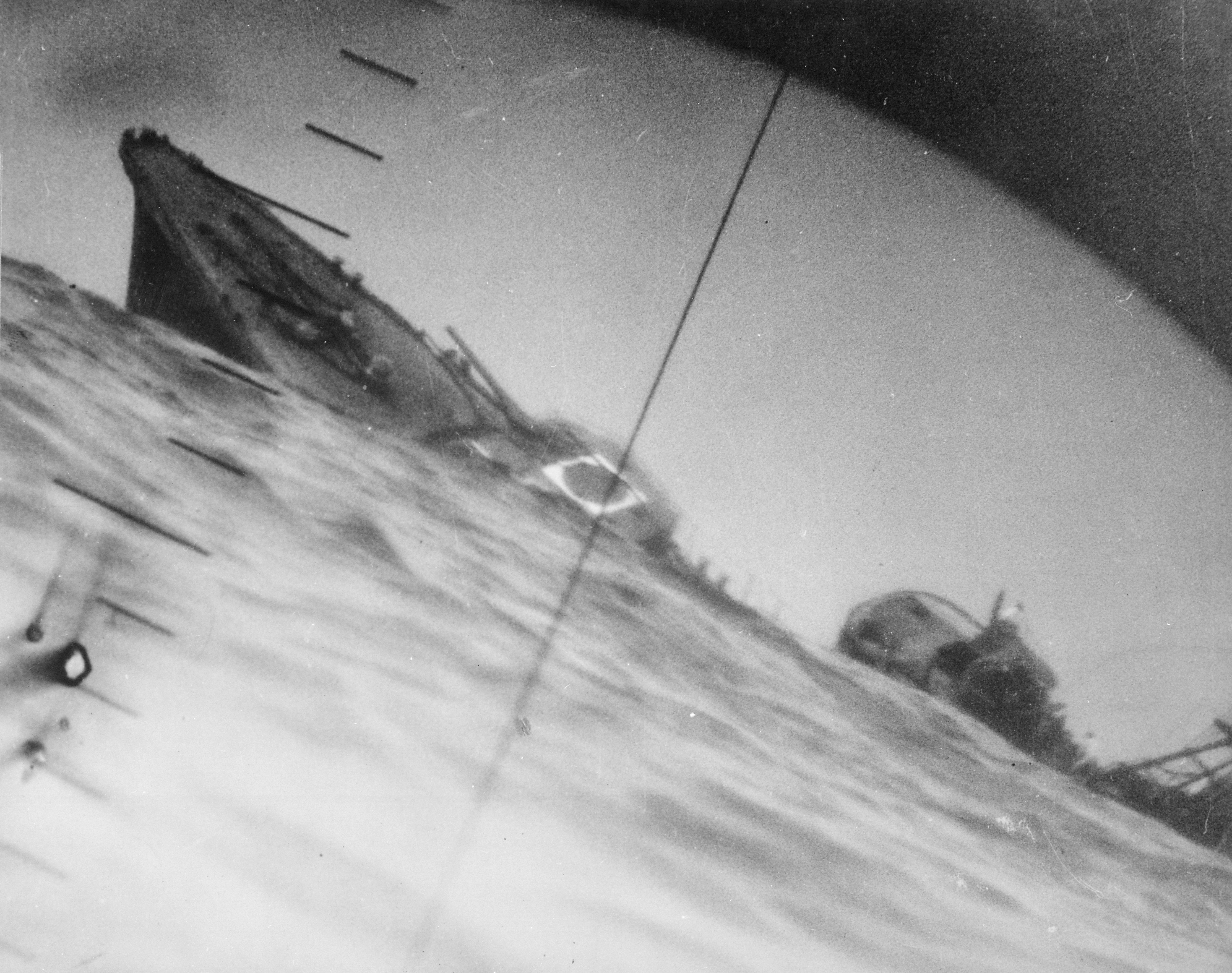
Periscope photo of Yamakaze sinking.

From the very start, the Salmons were in the thick of the fight in the defense of the Philippines. The submarines of the Asiatic Fleet were the primary striking force available to Admiral Thomas C. Hart, the fleet's commander. He was assigned sixteen Salmons or Sargos, the entirety of both classes. The Japanese did not bomb Cavite Navy Yard until 10 December 1941, so almost all of the submarines were able to get underway before an attack.

The qualities designed into the Salmons for their role as fleet submarines made them well suited for the war they found themselves fighting, but some shortcomings came up that were not apparent prior to the war. It came to be realized that the boats were going to spend a lot more time on the surface than what had been previously acknowledged. Thus the large bulk of the conning tower fairwater became a liability. It was too easily spotted by keen-eyed Japanese lookouts using their excellent binoculars. It was found that portions of the fairwater plating could be cut away both fore and aft of the bridge, greatly reducing the silhouette. This also had the desirable effect of creating mounting locations for 20mm Oerlikon autocannons, which were useful against aircraft and small surface targets.

The timely development of radar in the USN proved to be a key factor in the eventual victory over the Imperial Japanese Navy, and its incorporation into the Salmons and other USN submarines gave them a critical advantage in detection and defense. The first sets became available within days of the war beginning, and they were introduced to the boats as they went into overhaul in 1942.

The original Mark 21 3-inch (76 mm)/50 caliber deck gun proved to be too light in service. It lacked sufficient punch to finish off crippled or small targets quickly enough to suit the crews. It was replaced by the Mark 9 4-inch (102 mm)/50 caliber gun in 1943–44, in most cases removed from an S-boat being transferred to training duty.

The Submarine Force relied heavily on the well-liked Salmons during the first two and a half years of the war, with some of them completing 15 war patrols before being assigned to training duties by 1945.

Salmon barely survived a severe depth charging by Japanese escort ships on 30 October 1944. She was retired from combat duty and spent the rest of the war as a training boat.

Skipjack was expended as a target twice postwar: once in the Operation Crossroads nuclear weapons tests at Bikini Atoll 25 July 1946, and again as a target for aircraft rockets off California 11 August 1948.

== See also ==
- Allied submarines in the Pacific War
- List of lost United States submarines
- Unrestricted submarine warfare
- Torpedo
- List of submarine classes of the United States Navy
- List of submarines of the Second World War
