= USS Sturgeon (SS-187) =

Salmon-class submarine of the US Navy

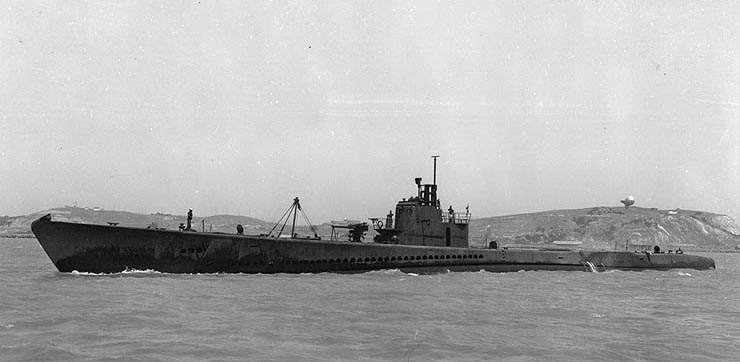
- USS Sturgeon (SS-187) off Mare Island, 1943.

History

United States
- Name: Sturgeon
- Namesake: Sturgeon
- Builder: Mare Island Naval Shipyard
- Laid down: 27 October 1936
- Launched: 15 March 1938
- Commissioned: 25 June 1938
- Decommissioned: 15 November 1945
- Stricken: 30 April 1948
- Fate: Sold for scrap, 12 June 1948

General characteristics
- Class & type: Salmon-class composite diesel-hydraulic and diesel-electric submarine
- Displacement: 1,435 long tons (1,458 t) standard, surfaced; 2,198 long tons (2,233 t) submerged
- Length: 308 ft 0 in (93.88 m)
- Beam: 26 ft 1 1/4 in (7.957 m)
- Draft: 15 ft 8 in (4.78 m)
- Propulsion: 4 × General Motors Model 16-248 V16 diesel engines (two hydraulic-drive, two driving electrical generators); 2 × 120-cell batteries; 4 × high-speed Elliott electric motors with reduction gears; two shafts; 5,500 shp (4.1 MW) surfaced; 2,660 shp (2.0 MW) submerged
- Speed: 21 knots (39 km/h) surfaced; 9 knots (17 km/h) submerged
- Range: 11,000 nautical miles (20,000 km) at 10 knots (19 km/h)
- Endurance: 48 hours at 2 knots (3.7 km/h) submerged
- Test depth: 250 ft (76 m)
- Complement: 5 officers, 54 enlisted
- Armament: 8 × 21 inch (533 mm) torpedo tubes; (four forward, four aft); 24 torpedoes; 1 × 3 in (76 mm) / 50-caliber deck gun; four machine guns

USS Sturgeon (SS-187), a Salmon-class submarine, was the second ship of the United States Navy to be named for the sturgeon. Her 1944 sinking of the Japanese troopship Toyama Maru, killing more than 5,000 Japanese, was one of the highest death tolls from the sinking of a single ship in history. Her 1942 sinking of the Montevideo Maru which, unknown to crew on the Sturgeon, was carrying over 1,000 POWs, was the worst maritime disaster in Australian history.

== Construction ==
Her keel was laid down on 27 October 1936, by the Mare Island Naval Shipyard. She was launched on 15 March 1938, sponsored by Mrs. Alice N. Freeman, wife of Charles S. Freeman, Commander, Submarine Force, United States Fleet. The boat was commissioned on 25 June 1938.

== 1938–1941 ==
Sturgeon completed builder's trials in Monterey Bay and began her shakedown cruise on 15 October 1938, visiting ports in Mexico, Honduras, Panama, Peru, Ecuador, and Costa Rica before returning to San Diego, on 12 December 1938. She was assigned to Submarine Squadron (SubRon) 6 and operated along the West Coast as far north as Washington. She made two squadron cruises to Hawaii with the Pacific Fleet: from 1 July to 16 August 1939 and from 1 April to 12 July 1940. The submarine departed San Diego on 5 November 1940 for Pearl Harbor and operated from there until November 1941.

Sturgeon stood out of Pearl Harbor on 10 November, headed for the Philippine Islands and arrived at Manila Bay on 22 November. She was then attached to SubRon 2, Submarine Division (SubDiv) 22, United States Asiatic Fleet.

== First patrol: December 1941 ==
Sturgeon was moored in Mariveles Naval Section Base on 7 December 1941 during the Japanese attack on Pearl Harbor. She put to sea the next afternoon to patrol an area between the Pescadores Islands and Formosa. A small tanker was sighted the afternoon of 9 December, but it remained out of torpedo range.

The submarine found a convoy of five merchant ships accompanied by a cruiser and several destroyers on 18 December. As she came to periscope depth within attack range of the cruiser, she was sighted by one of the escorts approximately 250 yards (230 m) away. She started going deep but had only reached a depth of 65 feet (20 m) when the first depth charge exploded, breaking numerous light bulbs but causing no serious damage. Sturgeon began silent running and evaded the escorts.

On the evening of 21 December, the submarine sighted a darkened ship believed to be a large cargo carrier. A torpedo spread was fired from the stern tubes, but they all passed ahead of the ship because of an error in her estimated speed. The ship ended her first war patrol when she returned to Mariveles Bay on 25 December.

== Second patrol: December 1941 – March 1942 ==
Sturgeon was at sea again on 28 December 1941 en route to the Tarakan area, off the coast of Borneo. A tanker was sighted southwest of Sibutu Island on 17 January 1942, but all three torpedoes missed and the ship escaped. On the night of 22 January, Sturgeon was alerted by Pickerel that a large convoy was headed her way in Makassar Strait. A few minutes later, her sonar picked up the pings of ships dead astern. She submerged and fired four torpedoes at a large ship, with two explosions following. The submarine was then subjected to a two and one-half-hour depth charge attack by two destroyers which caused no damage.

On 26 January she sighted an enemy transport and four destroyers off Balikpapan. Sturgeon fired a spread from her forward tubes which resulted in a large explosion on the transport, and her screws stopped turning. No post-war record of a sinking could be found, but the transport was believed damaged. Three days later, she made two hits on a tanker.

On the morning of 8 February, Sturgeon found herself on the track of an enemy invasion fleet headed toward Makassar. She submerged to avoid detection by several destroyers and a cruiser as they passed overhead but was able to report the movement of the convoy to command. The submarine retired from her patrol area two days later when she was ordered to Java. She arrived at Soerabaja on 13 February, but since the Japanese were advancing upon that base, the ship proceeded to Tjilatjap. After embarking part of the Asiatic Fleet Submarine Force Staff, Sturgeon and Stingray sailed for Fremantle, Western Australia, on 20 February as escorts for Holland and Black Hawk.

== Third patrol: March – May 1942 ==
Sturgeon remained in Fremantle from 3 to 15 March, when she departed to again patrol off Makassar. On 30 March she sank the cargo ship Choko Maru. On 3 April one of her torpedoes struck a 750-ton frigate directly under the bridge, and she was officially listed as probably sunk. She then fired three torpedoes at a merchantman but missed. With one torpedo remaining in the bow tubes, she fired and hit the target abreast the foremast. When last seen, it was listing heavily to port and making for the Celebes shore.

On 6 April she fired a spread at a tanker, but the range was so close that they failed to arm. The submarine was then depth charged by escorts but eluded them and patrolled off Cape Mandar (in West Sulawesi) in the Makassar Strait. On 22 April a destroyer's searchlight blinked to Sturgeon, and she went deep to avoid the subsequent two-hour depth charge attack. On 28 April the submarine sailed for Australia. However, she interrupted her voyage on the night of 30 April in an attempt to rescue some Royal Australian and Royal Air Force personnel reported on an island at the entrance of Cilacap Harbor. A landing party under Lieutenant Chester W. Nimitz, Jr. entered the cove and examined it by searchlight but found only a deserted lean-to. She continued to Fremantle and arrived there on 7 May.

== Fourth patrol: June – July 1942 ==
Sturgeon refitted and returned to sea on 5 June to patrol an area west of Manila. On 25 June she caught up with a nine-ship convoy before daylight and fired three torpedoes at the largest ship and heard explosions. After some 21 depth charges were dropped by the escorts, she managed to escape with only a few gauges broken. On 1 July Sturgeon she sank the 7,267-ton prisoner transport Montevideo Maru off the coast of Luzon. On 5 July she scored hits on a tanker in a convoy northbound from Manila. Her patrol ended on 22 July when she arrived at Fremantle for refit.

It was later discovered that Montevideo Maru had been carrying over 1,000 Australian prisoners of war and civilian internees from Rabaul. 1,140 (including 88 Japanese crew) were killed while 18 survived. Some of the Japanese including the ship's captain made it to the Philippines, but most, including the captain, were killed by local guerrillas. This loss of Australian lives is the worst maritime disaster in Australian history. Only one eyewitness account has emerged. After 60 years the sole surviving Japanese sailor described the "death cries" of trapped Australians going down with the ship while others sung Auld Lang Syne.

== Fifth patrol: September – October 1942 ==
Sturgeon stood out of port on 4 September to begin her fifth war patrol in an area between Mono Island and the Shortland Islands in the Solomon Islands group. On 11 September she began patrolling west of Bougainville to intercept enemy shipping between Rabaul, Buka, and Faisi. The submarine fired four torpedoes at a large cargo ship, on 14 September but missed with all.

Three days later she fired a spread at a tanker with two apparent hits. At 05:36 on 1 October Sturgeon sighted the 8,033-ton aircraft ferry Katsuragi Maru. A spread of four torpedoes was fired and resulted in three hits which sent the ship to the bottom. An escort depth charged the submarine for a while and then broke off to rescue survivors. Sturgeon moved south of Tetepare Island and patrolled there until she returned to Brisbane on 25 October for repairs and refit.

== Sixth patrol: November 1942 – January 1943 ==
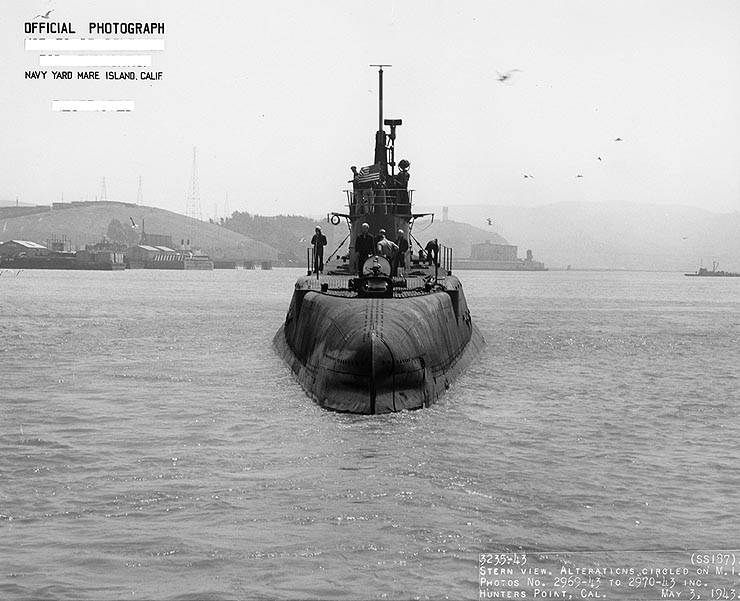
USS Sturgeon, 3 May 1943

Sturgeon returned to sea and began patrolling in the Truk area on 30 November. She fired four torpedoes at a Japanese ship on 6 December and observed one hit. She missed hitting targets on 9 and 18 December. The ship withdrew from the area on 25 December and arrived at Pearl Harbor on 4 January 1943. She was in the yard from 14 January to 11 May for an overhaul.

== Seventh and eighth patrols: June – October 1943 ==
Sturgeon's seventh war patrol began on 12 June and ended at Midway Island on 2 August. She sighted seven worthwhile targets but was able to attack only one. That occurred on 1 July when she fired a spread at a freighter and heard two hits, causing possible damage. The next patrol, from 29 August to 23 October, was equally unrewarding, and she returned to Pearl Harbor.

== Ninth patrol: December 1943 – January 1944 ==
On 13 December 1943, Sturgeon sailed for Japanese home waters. She sighted a seven-ship convoy with four escorts on 11 January 1944. Finding an overlapping target, she fired four torpedoes, and the cargo ship Erie Maru went to the bottom. The submarine was forced to go deep to avoid a depth charge attack and was unable to regain contact with the convoy. Five days later, she attacked a freighter Akagi Maru and the destroyer Suzutsuki in Bungo Channel. Suzutsuki was hit by two torpedoes which blew off the bow and stern. Sturgeon was pinned down all afternoon by the destroyer Hatsuzuki's counterattacks and cleared the area at 18:55. Two attacks were made on a four-ship convoy on 24 January. One hit was registered on a Japanese merchant ship from the first attack while the spread fired at the other merchant ship sank Chosen Maru. Two days later, she made a fruitless attack on two freighters, and the submarine returned to Pearl Harbor, via Midway, for refit.

== Tenth patrol: April – May 1944 ==
Sturgeon's next assignment was in the Bonin Islands area from 8 April until 26 May and included plane guard duty near Marcus Island during aircraft carrier strikes there. On 10 May, she attacked a convoy of five merchant ships and two escorts. She made two hits on a small freighter before the escorts and an enemy plane forced the submarine to go deep. Sturgeon finally came to periscope depth and trailed the convoy until the next morning when she made an end-around run and fired four torpedoes at a freighter. Three hits put Seiru Maru under in two minutes. The submarine swung around and fired her bow tubes at another ship. Two hits were recorded; when last seen the target was dead in the water, smoking heavily. The submarine began plane guard duty on 20 May and rescued three airmen before heading for Midway two days later.

== Eleventh patrol: June – August 1944 ==
Sturgeon sailed for the Nansei Shoto on 10 June to begin her last war patrol. Only two worthy contacts were made, and they were heavily escorted. The first was an eight-ship convoy which she attacked on 29 June. Four torpedoes were fired at a large ship. Four hits on the 7,089-ton passenger-cargo troopship Toyama Maru sent her up in flames and to the bottom. This sinking had a sizeable influence on the battle of Okinawa, as the ship was carrying 5,600 troops of the 44th Independent Mixed Brigade that were on their way to the island. On 3 July Sturgeon sighted a nine-ship convoy accompanied by air cover and numerous small escorts. She registered three hits on the cargo ship Tairin Maru that blew her bow off and holed her side. She rolled to starboard and sank. The submarine went deep and avoided the 196 depth charges and aerial bombs that were rained down upon her. She evaded the escorts and returned to Pearl Harbor on 5 August.

== 1944–1948 ==
Sturgeon was routed to California for an overhaul and arrived at San Francisco on 15 August. On 31 December 1944 the ship shifted to San Diego and sailed on 5 January 1945 for the East Coast. She arrived at New London on 26 January and was assigned to SubRon 1. Sturgeon operated in Block Island Sound as a training ship until 25 October. She entered the Boston Navy Yard on 30 October and was decommissioned on 15 November 1945. Sturgeon was struck from the Naval Vessel Register on 30 April 1948 and sold to Interstate Metals Corporation of New York City on 12 June 1948 for scrap.

== Awards ==
- Asiatic-Pacific Campaign Medal with 10 battle stars for World War II service
