= James Wiggin Coe =

American submarine commander

James Coe
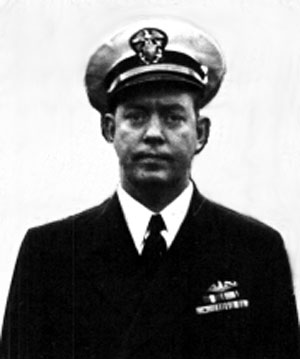
- Commander James Wiggins Coe
- Born: James Wiggins Coe; June 13, 1909; Richmond, Indiana, U.S.
- Died: September 28, 1943 (aged 34); Presumed South China Sea
- Military career
- Allegiance: United States of America
- Branch: United States Navy
- Service years: 1926–1943
- Rank: Commander (United States)
- Nickname: Red
- Service number: 0-063137
- Commands: USS S-39; USS Skipjack (SS-184); USS Cisco (SS-290)
- Conflicts: World War II
- Awards: Navy Cross; Purple Heart

Commander James Wiggins "Red" Coe (June 13, 1909 – September 28, 1943) (missing), January 8, 1946 (presumed dead) was an American submariner. A submarine ace, Coe commanded USS Skipjack and Cisco during operations in the Pacific theatre of World War II. After a number of successful patrols, Coe and the Cisco failed to return from patrol in November 1943, and her captain and crew were presumed dead in 1946.

== Early life and career ==
Born in Richmond, Indiana, Coe attended Morton High School and then the US Naval Academy and Annapolis, Maryland. Commissioned in June 1930, he served aboard USS Nevada and then USS Chicago. From 1931 he commenced training in submarines, and served on USS S-27 in 1933, followed by USS S-29 in 1935 and USS S-33 in 1937.

After two years back in the United States as an instructor, he took command of USS S-39 in January 1940 and, after the Japanese attacked Pearl Harbor, he commanded her during three war patrols in the Southeast Asia. On March 4, 1942, Coe commanded S-39 when she attacked and sank a Japanese tanker in Sunda Strait.

Coe transferred to the USS Skipjack in March 1942.

== Skipjack ==
Coe commanded Skipjack for three war patrols (Skipjack's third, fourth and fifth) during which he sank four Japanese merchant ships and damaged another.

While in command of the Skipjack, he wrote a letter to his superiors in the supply division complaining about a lack of toilet paper aboard his vessel. Included in the memorandum was "a sample of the desired material" to help supply identify the item being requested, while commenting that in the meantime, "personnel during this period has become accustomed to the use of “Ersatz” the vast amount of incoming non-essential paper work" and closing with the remark that "in order to cooperate in war effort at small local sacrifice, the SKIPJACK desires no further action to be taken until the end of current war which has created a situation aptly described as “War is Hell”." The letter later served as inspiration for a scene in the 1959 comedy film Operation Petticoat. Coe's letter and the roll of toilet paper are preserved at the Submarine Force Library and Museum in Groton, Connecticut.

Coe also fired the first Mark 14 torpedo to be shot with its magnetic influence disabled as part of a new test run ordered by Rear-Admiral Charles A. Lockwood, which took place off of King George Sound in June 1942.

== USS Cisco and death ==
Coe was appointed prospective commanding officer of the USS Cisco in January 1943. He became the submarine's first commanding officer when it was commissioned on May 10. He was awarded the Navy Cross "for extraordinary heroism" while serving in the Pacific sinking Japanese merchant shipping.

In September 1943, Cisco sailed on its first war patrol to the South China Sea, where his submarine was presumed lost in action. (Postwar analysis concluded that Cisco was sunk by Japanese forces on September 28.) Coe was posthumously awarded the Purple Heart.

== Japanese ships sunk by submarines under Coe's command ==
- March 4, 1942 - USS S-39 sank fleet tanker Erimo (6500 GRT).
- May 6, 1942 - USS Skipjack sank transport ship Kanan Maru (2567 GRT).
- May 8, 1942 - USS Skipjack sank transport ship Bujun Maru (4804 GRT).
- May 17, 1942 - USS Skipjack sank troop transport Tazan Maru (5477 GRT).
- October 14, 1942 - USS Skipjack sank transport ship Shunko Maru (6780 GRT).

Source - U-Boat.net

== Legacy ==
Coe's successful patrols with the Skipjack and his command of the Cisco gave him some notoriety, leading to his name appearing in a contemporary list of the Top Skippers of World War II By Number of Confirmed Kills.

A military rest camp in Subic Bay in the Philippines – part of the U.S. Naval Base Subic Bay – is named in his honour, as is a street in Naval Station Pearl Harbor.

== Awards ==
- Navy Cross
- Purple Heart (posthumous)
- Combat Action Ribbon (posthumous)
- American Defense Service Medal with "FLEET" clasp
- Asiatic-Pacific Campaign Medal with five battle stars
- World War II Victory Medal (posthumous)
- Philippine Presidential Unit Citation
- Philippine Defense Medal (posthumous)

=== Navy Cross citation ===
The President of the United States of America takes pleasure in presenting the Navy Cross to Lieutenant Commander James Wiggins Coe (NSN: 0-63137), United States Navy, for extraordinary heroism in the line of his profession as Commanding Officer of the U.S.S. S-39 (SS-144) during the FIRST through the FOURTH War Patrols in the Southwest Pacific from 8 December 1941 through March 1942, and as Commanding Officer of the U.S.S. SKIPJACK (SS-184), on the THIRD War Patrol of that submarine during the period 14 April 1942 to 17 May 1942, in enemy controlled waters at Cam Ranh Bay. While conducting war patrols as Commanding Officer of the U.S.S. S-39, Lieutenant Commander Coe boldly and successfully delivered an attack under hazardous and difficult conditions which resulted in the sinking of an armed enemy auxiliary vessel in Philippine waters, and later, a large enemy naval tanker in the Java Sea. Furthermore, while Commanding Officer of the U.S.S. SKIPJACK, he skillfully evaded enemy naval and air patrols to deliver a vigorous and effectively executed attack against enemy vessels, armed or escorted by anti-submarine craft. In these engagements, the SKIPJACK succeeded in destroying two large enemy auxiliaries and an enemy Japanese transport in the South China Sea and seriously damaging and presumably sinking another enemy armed auxiliary. Lieutenant Commander Coe displayed the outstanding characteristics of a leader, and the aggressive and intrepid spirit of a fine seaman which were in keeping with the traditions of the United States Naval Service.
