= Toyama Maru =

Japanese ship

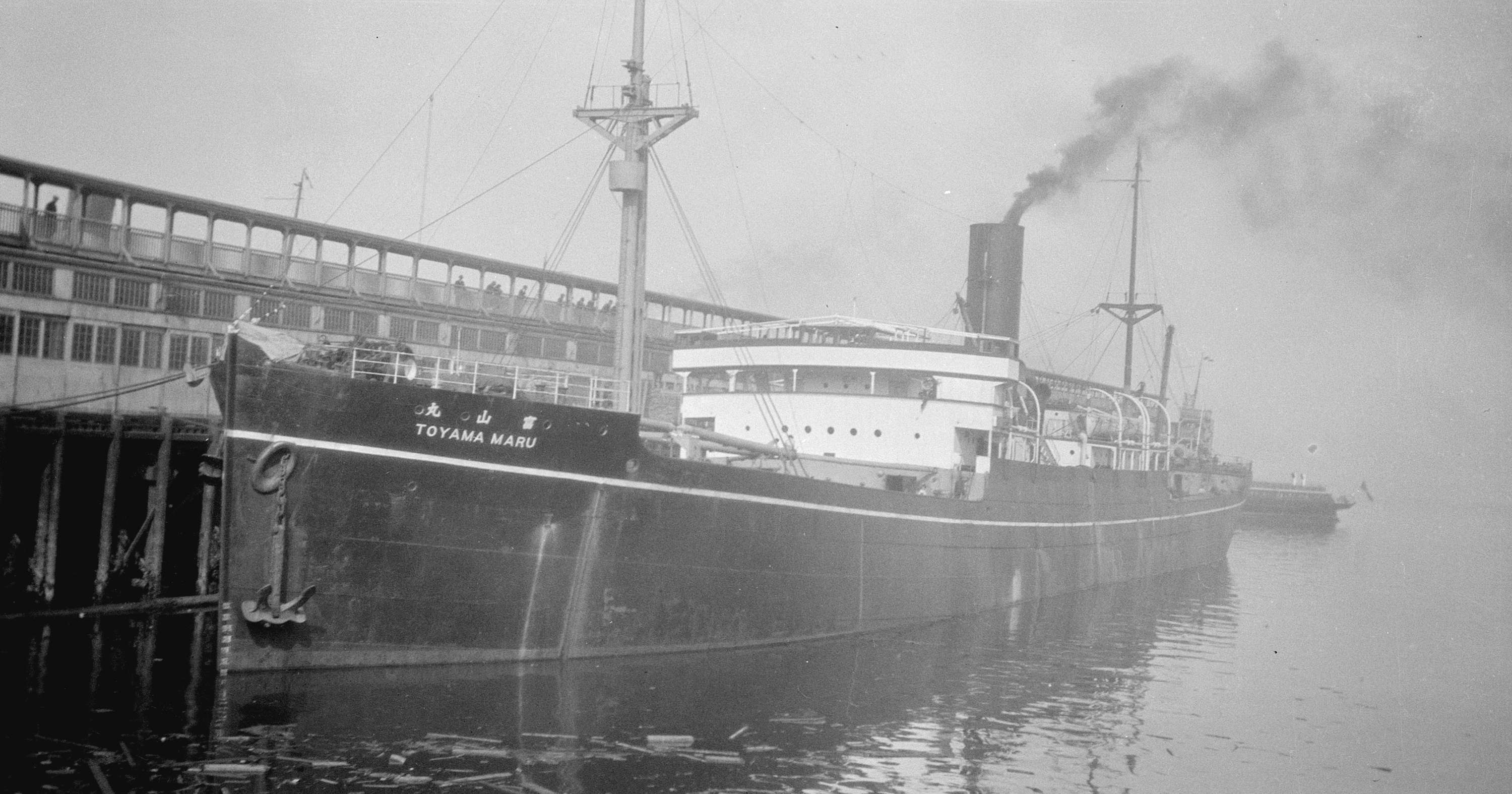
- Toyama Maru in 1941

History

Empire of Japan
- Name: Toyama Maru
- Namesake: Toyama
- Owner: NYK Line (1915–1937); Nanyo Kaiun K.K. (1937–1938); Ono Shoji Gomei K.K. (1938–1943); Taiyo Kogyo, K. K (1943–1944)
- Ordered: 1913
- Builder: Mitsubishi Dockyard & Engineering Works
- Laid down: 4 August 1913
- Launched: 20 March 1915
- Completed: 3 June 1915
- In service: June 1915
- Out of service: 29 June 1944
- Fate: Sunk near Tairajima, 29 June 1944

General characteristics
- Type: Troop transport
- Tonnage: 7,085 GRT
- Length: 135.6 m (444 ft 11 in)
- Beam: 17.7 m (58 ft 1 in)
- Draught: 10.4 m (34 ft 1 in)
- Installed power: 5,700 shp (4,300 kW)
- Propulsion: 4 x steam turbine engines DR geared to dual shaft, 2 screws, 4 single boilers, 12 corrugated furnaces
- Speed: 14.5 knots (26.9 km/h; 16.7 mph)
- Capacity: 4,330 troops
- Crew: 76

Toyama Maru (富山丸) was a 7,089-ton Japanese troop transport during World War II. On 29 June 1944, Toyama Maru was transporting over 6,000 men of the Japanese 44th Independent Mixed Brigade when she was torpedoed and sunk.

== Building and registration ==
Toyama Maru was laid down on 4 August 1913, at Mitsubishi Dockyard & Engineering Works as Yard No. 243 in Nagasaki and was launched on 20 March 1915. The ship was completed three months later. Toyama Maru had a length of 445 feet (136 m) a beam of 58 feet (18 m) and was assessed at 7,085 gross register tons (GRT). She had a speed of 14 knots (26 km/h; 16 mph).

== Career ==
After Toyama Maru was completed, she began her maiden voyage under the NYK Line. During the First World War, she served European routes, transporting food and ammunition. She survived the war, and for the next 14 years, had an uneventful career. In 1933 she was switched to the Kobe to Surabaya route. In 1937, she was sold to Nanyo Kaiun K.K. She served with the company until 1938, when she was sold to the Ono Shoji Gomei K.K.

In September 1941, she was requisitioned by the Imperial Japanese Army to serve in the Second World War to be converted to a troop transport. In 1943, as the result of a merger, Toyama Maru was transferred to Taiyo Kogyo, K. K. She continued to serve as a troop transport until her sinking in June 1944.

== Sinking ==
On 27 June 1944, Toyama Maru departed Kagoshima Bay bound for Naha City on what would become her final voyage, with over 6,000 men aboard. She departed with 11 other ships, forming the Kata 412 convoy. At 07:30, the American submarine USS Sturgeon, stalking the convoy, spotted and fired four torpedoes at Toyama Maru. Two of the torpedoes hit the bow, igniting hundreds of gasoline drums, engulfing the ship in flames. A third torpedo hit midship, breaking the ship in half, and she promptly sank in the Nansei Shoto, off Taira Jima, Japan, at approximate position 27°47′N 129°05′E. 5,400 soldiers and crewmen were killed during the sinking, with 600 surviving.

== See also ==
- List by death toll of ships sunk by submarines
