= USS S-39 =

Submarine of the United States

Coordinates: 11°28.522′S 154°21.336′E

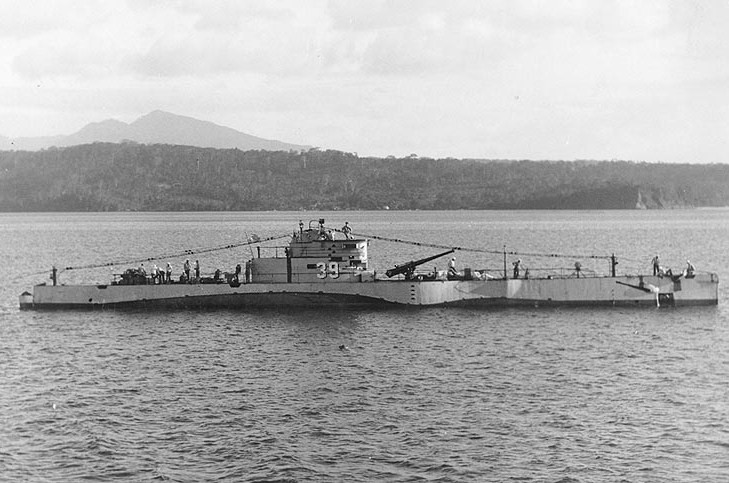
- USS S-39 off Olongapo, Philippine Islands, 1935

History

United States
- Name: USS S-39
- Builder: Bethlehem Shipbuilding Corporation, San Francisco, California
- Laid down: 14 January 1919
- Launched: 2 July 1919
- Sponsored by: Miss Clara M. Huber
- Commissioned: 14 September 1923
- Fate: Wrecked 13 August 1942

General characteristics
- Class & type: S-class submarine
- Displacement: 854 long tons (868 t) surfaced; 1,062 long tons (1,079 t) submerged
- Length: 211 ft (64 m) w/l; 219 ft 3 in (66.83 m) o/a
- Beam: 20 ft 9 in (6.32 m)
- Draft: 16 in (0.41 m)
- Installed power: 2,400 hp (1,800 kW) (diesel engines); 3,000 hp (2,200 kW) (electric motors)
- Propulsion: 2 × New London Ship & Engine (NELSECO) diesel engines; 2 × General Electric electric motors; 120-cell Exide battery; 2 × shafts
- Speed: 14.5 knots (16.7 mph; 26.9 km/h) surfaced; 11 kn (13 mph; 20 km/h) submerged
- Capacity: 168 long tons (171 t) diesel fuel
- Complement: 42 officers and men
- Armament: 1 × 4 in (102 mm)/50 cal deck gun; 4 × 21 inch (533 mm) torpedo tubes (12 torpedoes

Service record
- Operations: World War II
- Awards: 2 battle stars

USS S-39 (SS-144) was a United States Navy S-class submarine that saw combat in the Pacific Theater during World War II. She was accidentally run aground on her fifth war patrol and was subsequently abandoned.

== Construction and commissioning ==
S-39′s keel was laid down on 14 January 1919 by the Bethlehem Shipbuilding Corporation at San Francisco, California. She was launched on 2 July 1919 sponsored by Miss Clara M. Huber, and commissioned on 14 September 1923.

== Service history ==
After commissioning and fitting out, S-39 joined Submarine Force, Battle Fleet; and from October–December 1923, conducted maneuvers off southern California. With the next year, 1924, she moved south to the Panama Canal, thence proceeded into the Caribbean Sea for final trials, further exercises, and training dives. By April, she was back at Mare Island for her first overhaul.

=== Asiatic fleet ===
On 17 September, S-39 departed San Francisco for the Philippines. Steaming via Pearl Harbor and Guam, she reached Manila on 5 November; joined the Asiatic Fleet as a member of Submarine Division 17 (SubDiv 17); and commenced local operations and drills in the Luzon area. In mid-May 1925, she sailed for the Asiatic mainland with her division; and, after brief stops at Amoy and Hong Kong, arrived at Tsingtao, whence she operated until early September. She then returned to Manila and for the next 16 years maintained, with few interruptions, a similar schedule: summers at Tsingtao, with patrols along the China coast; winters in the Philippines, for overhauls, engineering trials, joint Army-Navy maneuvers, type training exercises, and short patrols.

=== World War II ===
==== 1st war patrol ====
Just prior to the entry of the United States into World War II, S-39 (under the command of James W. Coe, Class of 1930) patrolled off southern Luzon. After 8 December, she moved into San Bernardino Strait to impede Japanese mining activities. The escorts screening the minelayers, however, kept the submarine at bay with persistent depth charging. On 11 December, S-39 endured a day-long pounding. She then turned to cutting into the Japanese supply line. On 13 December, she sighted and attacked an enemy freighter, but escorts interfered and her crew was prevented from verifying a sinking. She continued her patrol, unsuccessfully chasing other targets, until 21 December, when she returned to Manila.

==== 2nd war patrol ====
Increased enemy air activity rendered naval installations in the area untenable, and S-39 was ordered to Java to join what in mid-January 1942 would become the ABDA command. Conducting her second war patrol en route, she arrived at Soerabaja on 24 January. She soon departed on her third patrol. Coe was transferred to command USS Skipjack in March 1942.

==== 3rd and 4th war patrol ====
As Japanese landings at Timor were expected, S-39 was ordered to the Karimata Strait. The main Japanese force transited the strait and landed at Java without S-39 sighting it. Operating in the South China Sea and Java Sea, she reconnoitered Chebia Island in search of a British admiral and an air marshal who had supposedly escaped Singapore. S-39 landed a search party, but failed to locate any refugees. She then sailed for Australia via the Sunda Strait, where on 4 March she found the 6,500 long tons (6,604 t) tanker (credited as 5,000 long tons (5,080 t) during the war) Erimo. S-39 fired four Mark 10 torpedoes, scoring three contact hits. This made S-39, like her "Sugar" boat sisters, S-37 and S-38, well known in the news. Two weeks later, she arrived at Fremantle, Australia. By the end of April, she had moved to Brisbane, which she departed on her fourth patrol on 10 May. For the next four weeks, she reconnoitered designated areas of the Louisiade Archipelago, and then operated in the Solomon Islands.

==== 5th war patrol and loss ====
S-39's fifth patrol (now under Francis E. Brown), delayed twice by mechanical failures and once by the necessity of hospitalizing her executive officer, began on 10 August. Assigned station off New Ireland, she made her way across the Coral Sea to the Louisiades. On the night of 13/14 August, she grounded on submerged rocks off Rossel Island and took on a 35° port list. S-39 immediately blew ballast tanks dry and jettisoned fuel to lighten ship, then backed emergency, to no avail. Heavy seas pounded her and pushed her farther up on the rocks.

Throughout 14 August, 15–20 ft (4.6–6.1 m) breakers crashed over the submarine, but the crew maintained their fight to refloat the ship, including jettisoning more fuel and firing four deactivated torpedoes. By 15 August, the list had increased to 60°. The heavy seas had not abated; S-39 continued to be pounded against the rocks, and a call for help brought word that the Australian minesweeper HMAS Katoomba was coming. Efforts were begun to rescue the crew. Lieutenant C.N.G. Hendrix and Chief Petty Officer W. L. Schoenrock swam ashore, secured mooring lines to a torpedo which had lodged in the reef for use as riding lines, and assisted other crew members to safety. By noon, 32 men had reached shore. Shortly thereafter, Katoomba arrived and by the same time the next day had taken all of the crew of S-39 on board. S-39 was left on the rocks, rather than destroyed by gunfire, as her commander was satisfied she would continue breaking up. Her crew were taken to Townsville and reassigned to other submarines. The commanding officer almost faced court martial (grounding in peacetime is considered negligence), but was saved by Admiral Ralph W. Christie.

== Awards ==
- Yangtze Service Medal
- China Service Medal
- American Defense Service Medal with "FLEET" Clasp
- Asiatic-Pacific Campaign Medal with two battle stars
- World War II Victory Medal
- Philippine Presidential Unit Citation
- Philippine Defense Medal with star

== Legacy ==
The book Pigboat 39 was written about S-39's experiences before and during World War II.
