= USS Cisco =

Submarine of the United States

Coordinates: 9°47′N 121°44′E

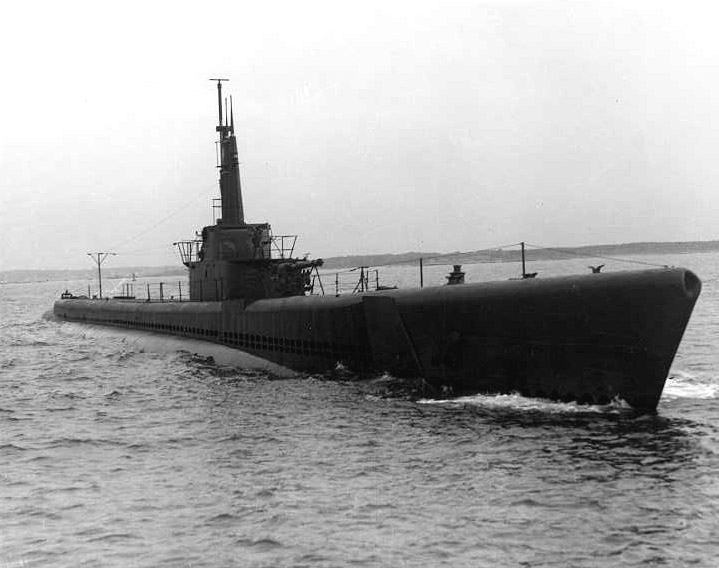
- Cisco (SS-290), underway during her sea trials off the New England coast, 19 June 1943.

History

United States
- Name: Cisco
- Builder: Portsmouth Naval Shipyard, Kittery, Maine
- Laid down: 29 October 1942
- Launched: 24 December 1942
- Commissioned: 10 May 1943
- Fate: Sunk by Japanese aircraft west of Mindanao, 28 September 1943

General characteristics
- Class & type: Balao-class diesel-electric submarine
- Displacement: 1,526 long tons (1,550 t) surfaced; 2,414 long tons (2,453 t) submerged
- Length: 311 ft 9 in (95.02 m)
- Beam: 27 ft 3 in (8.31 m)
- Draft: 16 ft 10 in (5.13 m) maximum
- Propulsion: 4 × General Motors Model 16-248 V16 Diesel engines driving electric generators; 2 × 126-cell Sargo batteries; 4 × high-speed General Electric electric motors with reduction gears; two propellers; 5,400 shp (4.0 MW) surfaced; 2,740 shp (2.0 MW) submerged
- Speed: 20.25 knots (37.50 km/h; 23.30 mph) surfaced; 8.75 knots (16.21 km/h; 10.07 mph) submerged
- Range: 11,000 nmi (20,000 km; 13,000 mi) surfaced at 10 knots (19 km/h; 12 mph)
- Endurance: 48 hours at 2 knots (3.7 km/h; 2.3 mph) submerged; 75 days on patrol
- Test depth: 400 feet (120 m)
- Complement: 10 officers, 70–71 enlisted
- Armament: 10 × 21-inch (533 mm) torpedo tubes; 6 forward, 4 aft; 24 torpedoes; 1 × 4-inch (102 mm) / 50 caliber deck gun; Bofors 40 mm and Oerlikon 20 mm cannon

USS Cisco (SS-290), a Balao-class submarine, was the only ship of the United States Navy to be named for the cisco, a whitefish of the Great Lakes.

== Construction and commissioning ==
Cisco's keel was laid down by the Portsmouth Navy Yard in Kittery, Maine. She was launched on 24 December 1942, sponsored by Mrs. A. C. Bennett, through her proxy, Mrs. N. Robertson, and commissioned on 10 May 1943 with Commander James W. Coe in command.

== Service history ==
Cisco reported to the United States Pacific Fleet. She sailed from Panama on 7 August 1943 for Brisbane, Australia, arriving 1 September to assume local patrol duties, until 18 September, when she docked at Darwin, Australia. She put out on her first war patrol 20 September 1943, but never returned. Japanese records tell of sighting a submarine leaking oil on 28 September in an area where Cisco is known to have been the only submarine then operating. Japanese records state this submarine was sunk by bombs and depth charges. Japanese records state that the submarine was attacked by Nakajima B5N (Allied reporting name "Kate") attack bombers of the 954 Naval Air Squadron and the gunboat Karatsu (originally the U.S. Navy gunboat USS Luzon, captured by Japanese forces and put to work against her former owners). Cisco is thus presumed to have been lost in action 28 September 1943. The only survivor from the crew fell ill in Darwin and was sent ashore to the Navy hospital prior to Cisco's final voyage.
