= USS Stingray (SS-186) =

Submarine of the United States

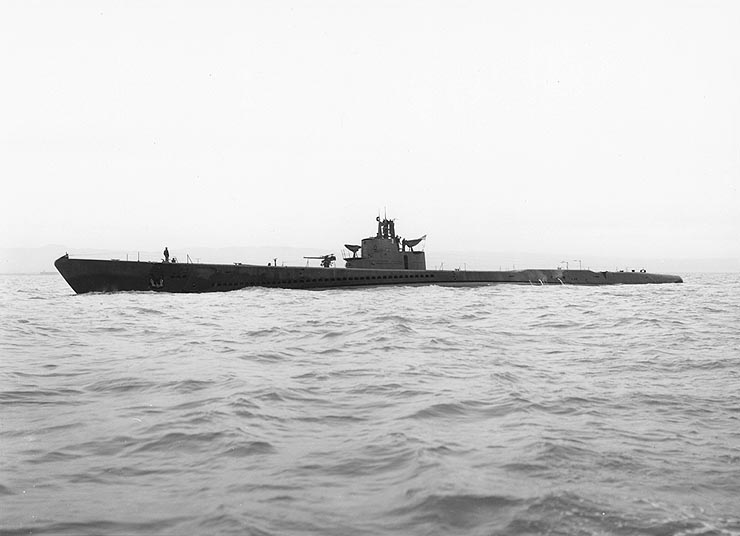
- USS Stingray off San Francisco, California, on 26 January 1944.

History

United States
- Name: Stingray
- Builder: Portsmouth Naval Shipyard, Kittery, Maine
- Laid down: 1 October 1936
- Launched: 6 October 1937
- Commissioned: 15 March 1938
- Decommissioned: 17 October 1945
- Stricken: 1 November 1945, then reinstated 28 November 1945, then struck again 3 July 1946
- Fate: Sold for scrap, 6 January 1947

General characteristics
- Class & type: Salmon-class composite diesel-hydraulic and diesel-electric submarine
- Displacement: 1,435 long tons (1,458 t) standard, surfaced; 2,198 long tons (2,233 t) submerged
- Length: 308 ft 0 in (93.88 m)
- Beam: 26 ft 1 1/4 in (7.957 m)
- Draft: 15 ft 8 in (4.78 m)
- Propulsion: 4 × General Motors Model 16-248 V16 diesel engines (two hydraulic-drive, two driving electrical generators); 2 × 120-cell batteries; 4 × high-speed Elliott electric motors with reduction gears; two shafts; 5,500 shp (4.1 MW) surfaced; 2,660 shp (2.0 MW) submerged
- Speed: 21 knots (39 km/h) surfaced; 9 knots (17 km/h) submerged
- Range: 11,000 nautical miles (20,000 km) at 10 knots (19 km/h)
- Endurance: 48 hours at 2 knots (3.7 km/h) submerged
- Test depth: 250 ft (76 m)
- Complement: 5 officers, 54 enlisted
- Armament: 8 × 21-inch (533 mm) torpedo tubes; (four forward, four aft); 24 torpedoes; 1 × 3 in (76 mm) / 50-caliber deck gun; four machine guns

USS Stingray (SS-186), a Salmon-class submarine, was the second ship of the United States Navy to be named the stingray.

== Construction and commissioning ==
Stingray′s keel was laid down at the Portsmouth Navy Yard in Kittery, Maine, on 1 October 1936. She was launched on 6 October 1937, sponsored by Mrs. Olive G. McLean, widow of Rear Admiral Ridley McLean, who had had a distinguished career in the submarine service, and was commissioned on 15 March 1938.

== Pre-World War II service ==
Following shakedown cruise off New England and in the Caribbean Sea, Stingray entered Portsmouth Navy Yard for alterations and upon completion on 14 January 1939, departed for a cruise in Caribbean waters. After briefly stopping at New London, Connecticut, on 20 April the submarine transited the Panama Canal and arrived at San Diego, California, on 11 May for a rigorous schedule of training and maneuvers as a unit of Submarine Squadron 6. She put to sea on 1 April 1940 for fleet exercises in the Hawaiian area, followed by overhaul at Mare Island Navy Yard at Vallejo, California. Upon completion, Stingray returned to the Hawaiian area, where she remained until joining the Asiatic Fleet at Cavite, Philippine Islands, on 23 October 1941.

== First and second war patrols ==
Stingray was at Manila on 7 December during the Japanese attack on Pearl Harbor, and immediately put to sea on her first war patrol. Patrolling in Lingayen Gulf, the submarine witnessed the Japanese invasion of Lingayen, but due to material deficiencies in the submarine, she was unable to attack. She terminated her first war patrol at Manila on 24 December.

Following repairs, Stingray got underway on her second war patrol on 30 December. While in Sama Bay on 10 January 1942, she torpedoed and sank her initial victim of the war, the transport Harbin Maru. The submarine then patrolled in Davao Gulf through 8 February without any contacts and put into Surabaja, Java, on 12 February. As the Japanese closed upon that Dutch base, she quickly got underway for Fremantle, Western Australia, arriving on 3 March.

== Third and fourth war patrols ==
Stingray departed Fremantle on 16 March for her third war patrol, conducted in the Celebes Sea and Java Sea. The only worthwhile target encountered during this patrol was a Japanese destroyer cruising just off Makassar City Celebes. Although the submarine fired three torpedoes at the enemy, all were misses. Stingray returned to Fremantle on 2 May.

For her fourth war patrol, Stingray got underway on 27 May and headed for Davao Gulf, and then on to Guam. On the afternoon of 28 June, the submarine sighted two ships with escort, and quickly began to close the range. She fired four torpedoes at the first ship, and the resultant explosion quickly sank the converted gunboat Saikyo Maru. The submarine continued patrol in the vicinity of Guam until 15 July, when she returned to Pearl Harbor for overhaul. During that overhaul, she was fitted with two external torpedo tubes, just below deck level forward.

== Fifth through seventh war patrols ==
Although Stingray's fifth war patrol, in the vicinity of the Solomon Islands, and sixth war patrol, conducted in the Marshall Islands, were unproductive, during the seventh, the submarine torpedoed and sank the cargo ship Tamon Maru.

== Eighth and ninth war patrols ==
For her eighth war patrol, Stingray got underway from Pearl Harbor on 12 June 1943, and set course for the Caroline Islands. Her only contact during this patrol was a high-speed northbound convoy that she was unable to close on. The submarine returned to Brisbane, Australia, from a disappointing patrol on 31 July.

On 23 August 1943, Stingray departed Brisbane for her ninth war patrol, conducted en route to Pearl Harbor. On 31 August, a United States Army Air Forces B-24 Liberator bomber attacked her as she crash-dived in the Solomon Sea 30 nautical miles (56 km; 35 mi) west of Buka Island at 05°24′S 154°07′E, dropping three 500-pound (227 kg) bombs which missed her by 50 feet (15 m).. Stingray suffered significant damage but no casualties. She was forced to surface and repair the damage. She then patrolled in the Admiralty Islands without making a single contact and terminated her ninth patrol at Pearl Harbor on 10 October 1943, continuing on to Mare Island Navy Yard for shipyard overhaul.

== Tenth war patrol ==
Following return to Pearl Harbor, Stingray got underway on 10 March 1944 for her tenth war patrol conducted in the Mariana Islands. On 30 March, she slipped past three escorts to gain attack position on two cargo ships, and fired four torpedoes at the lead ship. One torpedo hit amidships and stopped the enemy dead in the water. Stingray then fired four more torpedoes at the damaged cargo ship that quickly sent Ikushima Maru to the bottom.

On the afternoon of 8 April, while patrolling north of the Marianas, Stingray bounced off a large submerged object at a depth of 52 feet (16 m), lifting the submarine three or four feet (0.91 or 1.22 m). Inasmuch as the submarine was in the middle of the ocean, with her charts showing over 2,000 fathoms (12,000 ft; 3,700 m) of water, the first thoughts of the commanding officer concerned what new type of antisubmarine measure the enemy was using. Stingray then took precautionary soundings and found no bottom at 2,000 fathoms. Unable to determine what she had collided with, the submarine continued patrol.

During the early morning darkness of 13 April, Stingray's lookouts sighted the approach of a broaching torpedo. She made a sharp turn to port as the torpedo passed 100 feet (30 m) ahead. Two seconds later, a second torpedo just missed as it ran down her starboard side. She searched the area for her attacker without success and returned to Pearl Harbor on 22 April.

== Eleventh through sixteenth war patrols and fate ==
Stingray spent her eleventh war patrol on lifeguard station for air strikes on Guam. On 11 June the submarine rescued a downed Navy aviator and the following day pulled two more airmen from the water. On 13 June, Stingray received word that a Navy airman was down approximately 500 yards (460 m) offshore. With shells exploding on either side of the submarine, she made four submerged approaches until the pilot was finally able to grab one of the submarine's periscopes and was towed safely clear of the island and taken on board. On 18 June, Stingray experienced a fire in her superstructure near the conning tower hatch. After extinguishing the fire several times only to have it flare up again, the trouble was finally located, and the submarine continued patrol. She returned to Majuro Atoll in the Marshall Islands on 10 July.

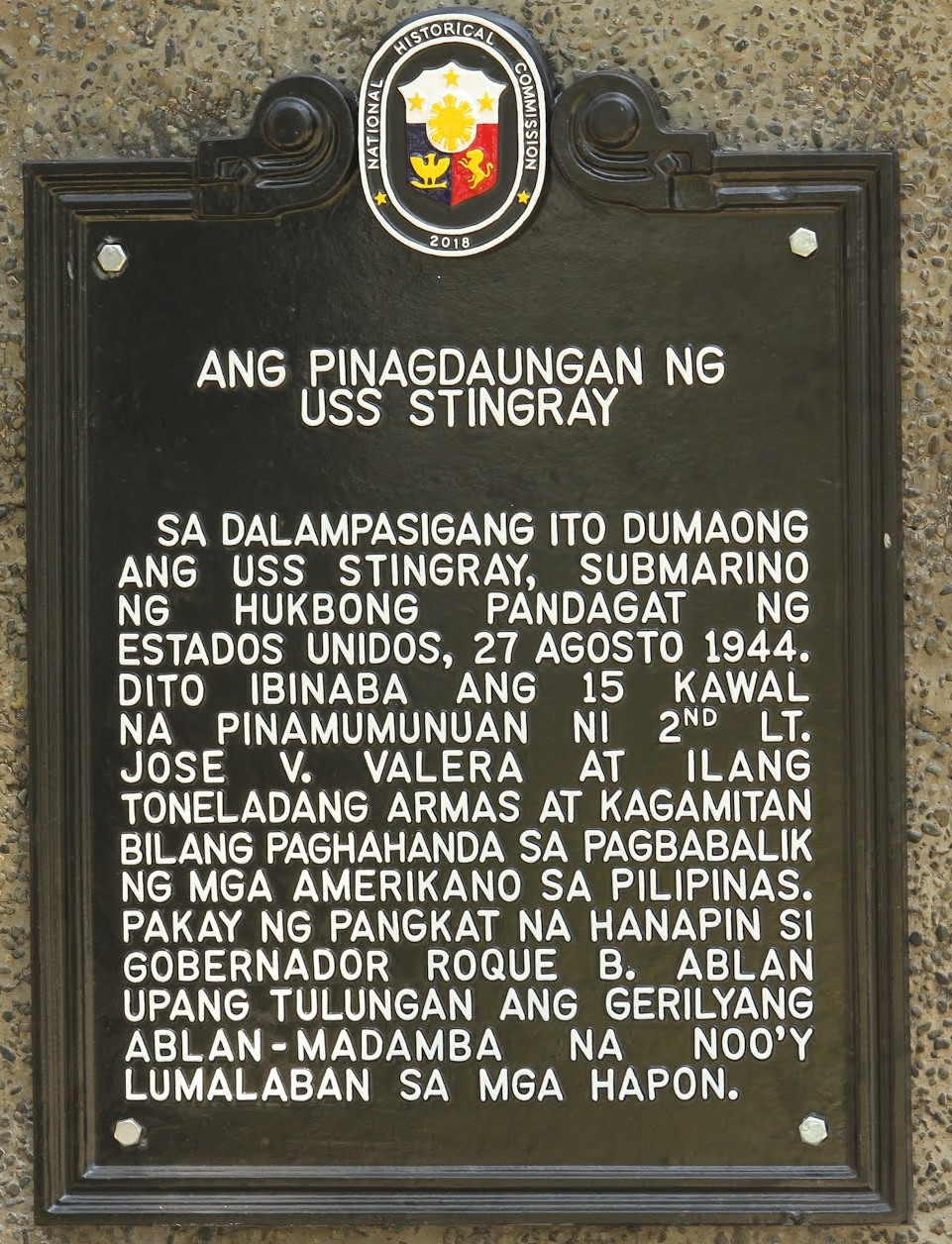
Philippine historical marker installed at the site in Pagudpud, Ilocos Norte, where Stingray conducted its twelfth patrol

For her twelfth war patrol, Stingray carried out a special mission, landing fifteen Filipino officers and men and six tons of supplies on the northeastern coast of Luzon. On the way back to Port Darwin, Australia, on 18 August, she picked up four Japanese sailors from the cruiser Natori, which was sunk earlier in the day. Stingray reached Port Darwin on 7 September 1944.

Stingray was underway again on 10 September 1944 for her thirteenth war patrol, spent on a special mission to look over possible landing beaches at Marjoe Island. She returned to Port Darwin on 19 September 1944.

Stingray carried out two special missions in the Philippine Islands during her fourteenth and fifteenth war patrols. She was on the surface in the Pacific Ocean 100 nautical miles (185 km; 115 mi) east-northeast of Morotai at 02°45′S 129°52′E on 3 October 1944 when a U.S. Navy TBF Avenger torpedo bomber from the escort carrier USS Midway (CVE-63) mistakenly attacked her. As she crash-dived to a depth of 120 feet (37 m), she heard a loud thud as she passed 110 feet (34 m), followed by an explosion after she reached 120 feet (37 m), prompting her to dive to 150 feet (46 m). She later learned that the thud probably was the sound of the TBF crashing while delivering the attack, killing the pilot, and that the explosion probably was the detonation of one of the TBF's depth charges as it sank.

On 11 January 1945, Stingray put to sea on her sixteenth and final war patrol. Four special missions in the Celebes area were carried out during this patrol. Landing parties were put ashore on Nipanipa Peninsula, Celebes; Kagean Island; Pare Pare Bay, Celebes; and another at Nipanipa Peninsula. She returned to Fremantle, Western Australia, on 23 February and then headed back to the United States arriving at New London, Connecticut, on 29 April. She operated there until decommissioned at the Philadelphia Navy Yard on 17 October 1945. She was stricken from the Naval Vessel Register on 3 July 1946 and sold for scrap the following year.

Two of Stingray's General Motors Model 248 V16 engines were acquired by the USS Cod in Cleveland, Ohio. The two V16 1,600 HP diesel engines were originally built in Cleveland, Ohio. The engines are held in reserve for parts for the restoration of Cod's engines.

== Honors and awards ==
- Asiatic-Pacific Campaign Medal with 12 battle stars for World War II service

Stingray holds the record for the most war patrols — sixteen — by any American submarine.
