= Wilhelm L. Friedell =

American submarine commander (1883–1958)

Wilhelm Lee Friedell
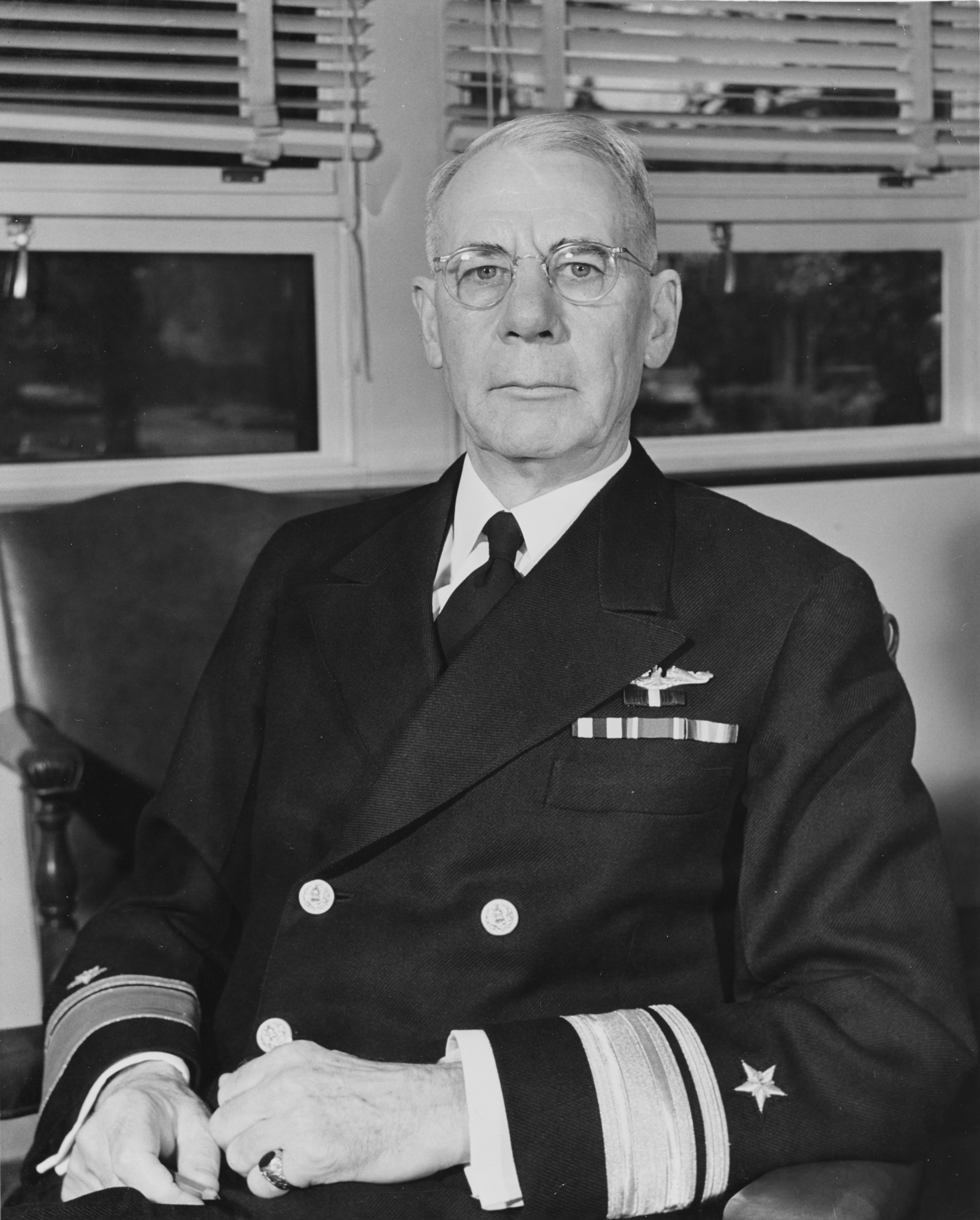
- Born: August 22, 1883; Texarkana, Arkansas, U.S.
- Died: January 27, 1958 (aged 74); San Diego, California, U.S.
- Burial place: Fort Rosecrans National Cemetery
- Education: United States Naval Academy
- Spouse: Lucie Matthews
- Military career
- Allegiance: United States of America
- Branch: United States Navy
- Service years: 1905-1946
- Rank: Rear admiral
- Commands: USS Villalobos (PG-42); First Submarine Division; USS Bushnell (AS-2); USS Rainbow; Submarine Division 11; USS Colorado (BB-45); COMSUBPAC; Naval Station Pearl Harbor; Mare Island Naval Shipyard; Naval Operating Base San Diego
- Conflicts: World War I World War II
- Awards: Navy Cross; Legion of Merit

Wilhelm Lee Friedell (August 22, 1883 – January 27, 1958) was a rear admiral in the United States Navy. Friedell was in command of the U. S. Naval Submarine Forces in European Waters during World War I, and was the commander of COMSUBPAC prior to the start of World War II.

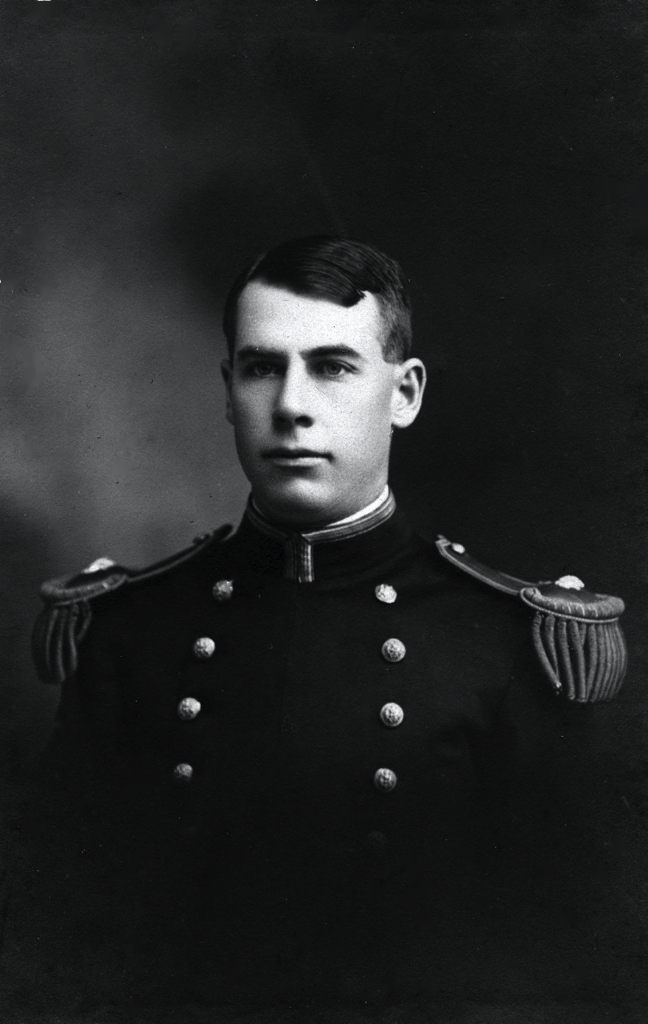
Friedell as a junior officer.

Friedell graduated from the United States Naval Academy with the class of 1905. He then served aboard the USS Kentucky for his mandatory two years of service at sea, and was commissioned as an ensign in the U.S. Navy in 1907. Still aboard the Kentucky, Friedell took part in the Second Occupation of Cuba and in 1908 he took part in the voyage of the Great White Fleet. He was transferred to the USS Helena where he served in the South China Sea as part of the Yangtze Patrol. Friedell took command of the USS Villalobos January 1910 and continued the Yangtze Patrol until October 1911. He then became a Navigator aboard the USS New Orleans. While serving aboard the New Orleans he led a landing party at Nanking during the 1911 Revolution to protect the American Consulate. He was then assigned to the Naval Academy as an instructor from March 1912 until April 1914. He then assumed command of the First Division, Submarine Flotilla, Atlantic Fleet aboard the USS C-3. He held this command from June 1914 until September 1916. He then took command of the USS Bushnell; his command continued throughout World War I in European waters. Following the war, Friedell led the Submarine Repair Division at the Philadelphia Navy Yard before returning to Annapolis as an instructor. He was then assigned to the USS Connecticut as her executive officer, a position he held from June 1921 until the following spring. He then assumed command of the submarine tender USS Rainbow and the Submarine Division 12. From 1923 until 1926, he again returned to Annapolis as an instructor. From 1926 until 1928 he commanded Submarine Division 11. In 1929 Friedell completed a senior course and the Naval War College and became head of the Department of Electric Engineering at Annapolis until the summer of 1931. In February 1936 he took command of the USS Colorado. While in command in 1937, he aided in the search for Amelia Earhart after her plane went missing. In November 1940 he took command of the Submarine Force, U.S. Fleet until January 1941. He served as the commandant of Mare Island Naval Shipyard from early 1941 until 1944 when he took command of the Eleventh Naval District and Naval Base San Diego. He retired in 1946 as a rear admiral. Admiral Friedell died January 27, 1958, at Naval Medical Center San Diego and was Buried at Rosecrans National Cemetery, San Diego, California.
