= USS Snapper (SS-185) =

Submarine of the United States

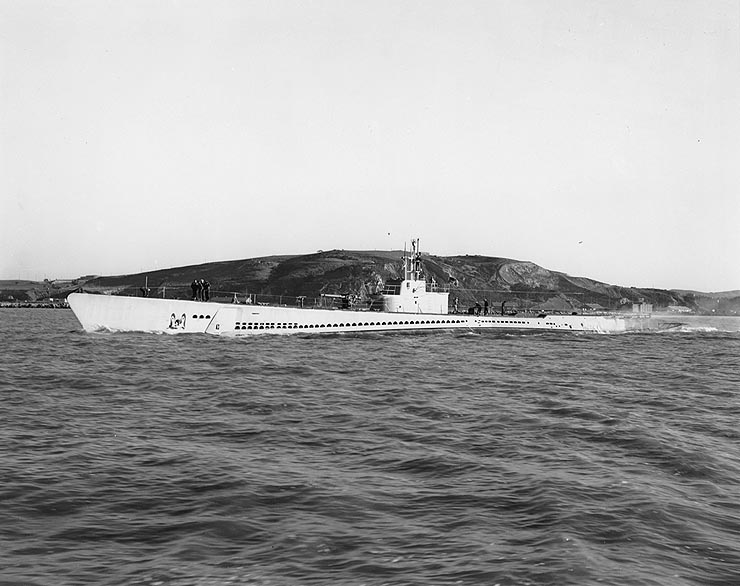
- USS Snapper off the Mare Island Navy Yard on 24 February 1945

History

United States
- Name: Snapper
- Builder: Portsmouth Naval Shipyard, Kittery, Maine
- Laid down: 23 July 1936
- Launched: 24 August 1937
- Commissioned: 15 December 1937
- Decommissioned: 15 November 1945
- Stricken: 30 April 1948
- Fate: Sold for scrap, 18 May 1948

General characteristics
- Class & type: Salmon-class composite diesel-hydraulic and diesel-electric submarine
- Displacement: 1,435 long tons (1,458 t) standard, surfaced; 2,198 long tons (2,233 t) submerged
- Length: 308 ft 0 in (93.88 m)
- Beam: 26 ft 1 1/4 in (7.957 m)
- Draft: 15 ft 8 in (4.78 m)
- Propulsion: 4 × General Motors Model 16-248 V16 diesel engines (two hydraulic-drive, two driving electrical generators); 2 × 120-cell batteries; 4 × high-speed Elliott electric motors with reduction gears; two shafts; 5,500 shp (4.1 MW) surfaced; 2,660 shp (2.0 MW) submerged
- Speed: 21 knots (39 km/h) surfaced; 9 knots (17 km/h) submerged
- Range: 11,000 nautical miles (20,000 km) at 10 knots (19 km/h)
- Endurance: 48 hours at 2 knots (3.7 km/h) submerged
- Test depth: 250 ft (76 m)
- Complement: 5 officers, 54 enlisted
- Armament: 8 × 21 inch (533 mm) torpedo tubes; (four forward, four aft); 24 torpedoes; 1 × 3 in (76 mm) / 50 caliber deck gun; four machine guns

USS Snapper (SS-185), a Salmon-class submarine, was the third ship of the United States Navy of the name and the second to be named for the snapper.

== Construction and commissioning ==
Snapper′s keel was laid down by the Portsmouth Navy Yard at Kittery, Maine, on 23 July 1936. She was launched on 24 August 1937, sponsored by Mrs. Katharine R. Stark, wife of Rear Admiral Harold R. Stark, Chief of the Bureau of Ordnance, and commissioned on 16 December 1937.

== Pre-World War II service ==
On 10 May 1938, Snapper departed Portsmouth, New Hampshire, for her shakedown cruise, visited Cuba, the Panama Canal Zone, Peru, and Chile, and returned to Portsmouth on 16 July. There, she conducted final acceptance trials and underwent post-shakedown overhaul.

On 3 October, Snapper was assigned to Submarine Squadron (SubRon) 3 based at Balboa, Canal Zone, where she participated in training and fleet exercises until 15 March 1939, when she set sail for repairs at the Portsmouth Navy Yard. Departing Portsmouth on 9 May, she stopped at New London, Connecticut, and then got underway for the West Coast, arriving at San Diego, California, on 2 June. On 1 July, the submarine set sail for Pearl Harbor and maneuvers in the Hawaiian area, followed by overhaul at the Mare Island Navy Yard in Vallejo, California, from 1 December 1939 to 1 March 1940.

Following her return to San Diego, Snapper was assigned to SubRon 6 and got underway for Hawaii on 1 April, arriving at Pearl Harbor on 9 April. Except for a brief voyage to San Diego in October and November 1940, Snapper remained in the Hawaiian area participating in training exercises and fleet tactics until 3 May 1941, when she departed for overhaul at the Mare Island Navy Yard. Upon completion, she became a unit of SubRon 2 based at San Diego. During the Japanese attack on Pearl Harbor, Snapper was operating in the Philippine Islands area.

== First and second war patrols ==
On 19 December, Snapper departed Manila for her first war patrol, covering the shipping lanes between Hong Kong and Hainan Strait until 8 January 1942, when she set sail for Davao Gulf in the Philippines. On 12 January, she made an unsuccessful attack on a Japanese supply ship which escaped when Snapper was forced down by an escorting destroyer. While off Cape San Agustin on 24 January, she attacked another supply ship without success, again being forced deep by destroyer escorts. On 1 February, as the submarine approached Bangka Strait, she was detected by an enemy destroyer which made a fruitless depth charge attack. In return, Snapper fired two torpedoes but both failed to find the target. Snapper arrived at Soerabaja, Java, on 10 February and then continued on to Fremantle, Western Australia.

Snapper departed Fremantle on 6 March for the approaches to Tarakan and her second war patrol. Finding no suitable targets there, she was directed to Davao Gulf where, on 31 March, she closed a large armed tender or auxiliary cruiser. She fired two bow torpedoes at 600 yards (550 m) and, after reversing course, came to periscope depth to observe the enemy ship dead in the water. After firing one torpedo from her stern tube, she was forced deep to evade an attacking escort ship. Later that night, she was ordered to Mactan Island to unload ammunition and take on board 46 tons of food for the besieged island of Corregidor. Arriving there on 4 April, she transferred her cargo to submarine rescue vessel Pigeon, took on board 27 evacuees, and headed back to Fremantle, evading Japanese destroyer patrols on the way.

On 23 April, Snapper received word that Searaven was in trouble and reversed course to go to her aid. After towing the stricken submarine to Fremantle, she sailed for Albany and then returned to Fremantle.

== Third and fourth war patrols ==
Snapper's third war patrol was conducted in the Flores Sea, Makassar Strait, and the western Celebes Sea. Despite intensive efforts, the submarine found no worthwhile targets and returned to Fremantle from a disappointing patrol on 16 July 1942.

On 8 August 1942, Snapper headed for the South China Sea and her fourth war patrol. On 19 August, she fired two torpedoes at a cargo ship but lost contact when forced to evade an escort ship. The only other targets sighted during this patrol were at too great a distance or on a course and speed that prevented the submarine from closing. On 28 September 1942, a PBY-5 Catalina flying boat of U.S. Navy Patrol Squadron 101 (VP-101) mistook her for a Japanese submarine and attacked her in the Indian Ocean 330 nautical miles (611 km; 380 mi) south-southwest of Bali at a position given by Snapper as 12°59′S 113°42′E and by the PBY-5 as 12°50′S 114°28′E. Snapper crash-dived, and the PBY-5 dropped one depth charge that shook Snapper as she passed through a depth of 140 feet (43 m) on her way to 250 feet (76 m). Snapper suffered only superficial damage and no casualties.

== Fifth, sixth and seventh war patrols ==
Wreck of Tokai Maru
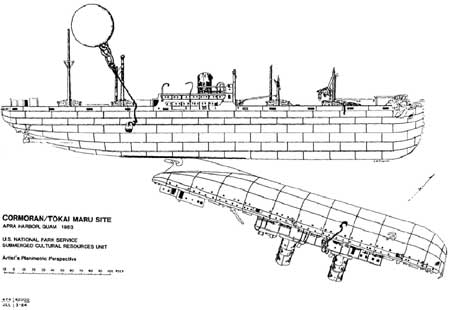
- Tokai Maru lies at the top of this National Park Service illustration. The drive shaft of Cormoran lies closest to the bottom of the Tokai. The buoy used by recreational scuba divers is marked.
- Dive type: Open-water, Deep, Wreck
- Depth range: 60 to 120 ft (18 to 37 m)
- Average visibility: 25 to 40 ft (7.6 to 12.2 m)
- Entry type: Boat, very rarely shore
- Bottom composition: Metal, silt
- Nearby sites: SMS Cormoran

Although both the fifth and sixth war patrols were also unproductive, during the seventh, conducted in the vicinity of Guam, Snapper sank her initial victim of the war. According to her war diary, she sighted two vessels moored in the extreme northeast corner of Apra Harbor, Guam, and decided to patrol submerged off the harbor until they departed. Seven days later, on 27 August, she headed to the north of the harbor, firing three torpedoes at the first target and one at the second. As she quickly departed the vicinity, Snapper observed one hit on the first target, sinking the passenger-cargo ship Tokai Maru, stern first.

On 2 September, Snapper closed a convoy of five cargo ships and two escorts. The primary targets, the cargo ships, zigged away; and, when the port escort came into view "head on," the submarine fired a "down-the-throat" shot at the escort, Mutsure, that blew the enemy's bow completely off and enveloped her in flames as she sank. The submarine quickly cleared the locality as the other escort commenced a depth charge attack. On 6 September, Snapper intercepted another convoy and fired three torpedoes; but all were misses. On 17 September, she terminated her seventh patrol at Pearl Harbor.

== Eighth and ninth war patrols ==
Snapper's eighth war patrol was conducted off Honshū, Japan, from 19 October to 14 December. While battling heavy seas on 29 November, the submarine sighted a convoy of five ships and two escorts and began to close the range. She fired three bow torpedoes and scored two hits that set the cargo ship Kenryu Maru ablaze as she settled by the bow and sank.

On 14 March 1944, following overhaul at Pearl Harbor, Snapper began her ninth war patrol, conducted in the area of the Bonin Islands. Few worthwhile targets were sighted during this patrol. On 24 March, she contacted a convoy of 12 ships and fired eight torpedoes with six hits. She was credited with damaging a freighter but, due to heavy seas, was unable to continue the attack. Enemy escorts and heavy seas continually prevented any further attacks, and Snapper returned to Midway Island on 29 April.

== Tenth and eleventh war patrols ==
Snapper spent her tenth war patrol engaged in lifeguard duties near Truk in support of bombardment missions by the United States Army Air Forces. On 9 June, while the submarine was patrolling on the surface, an enemy plane broke quickly from a low cloud and attacked. As Snapper quickly dove, one bomb struck directly above the hatch instantly killing one crewman and injuring several others, including the commanding officer. As the submarine continued to dive, shells were heard striking her hull. Upon surfacing, it was found that her pressure hull had not been damaged, but a heavy oil slick indicated a puncture of a fuel oil ballast tank. Minor repairs were made. Two wounded enlisted men were transferred to submarine tender Bushnell at Majuro Atoll on 13 June, and Snapper continued her lifeguard duty until returning to Pearl Harbor on 21 July.

On 5 September, Snapper departed Pearl Harbor for her eleventh and final war patrol, conducted in the Bonin Islands area. On 1 October, the submarine encountered two enemy vessels escorted by a small patrol craft. The submarine fired her bow torpedoes at the large target then swung for a "down-the-throat" shot at the smaller vessel. Hits were scored on both vessels resulting in the sinking of the passenger-cargo ship Seian Maru, and the coastal minelayer, Ajiro. Snapper then took up lifeguard station off Iwo Jima until 18 October and terminated her eleventh patrol at Midway on 27 October, before continuing on to Pearl Harbor.

== End of war and fate ==
Snapper departed Pearl Harbor on 2 November and set sail for overhaul at the Mare Island Navy Yard. Getting underway from Mare Island on 9 March 1945, the submarine arrived at San Diego on 11 March and engaged in local training operations for several months. She transited the Panama Canal on 20 May and arrived at New London, Connecticut, on 27 May where she operated until decommissioned at Boston, Massachusetts, on 15 November 1945. Snapper was struck from the Naval Vessel Register on 30 April 1948 and sold for scrap to the Interstate Metals Corporation of New York City, on 18 May 1948.

== Honors and awards ==
- Asiatic-Pacific Campaign Medal with six battle stars for World War II service
