= Douglas MacArthur =

United States Army general (1880–1964)

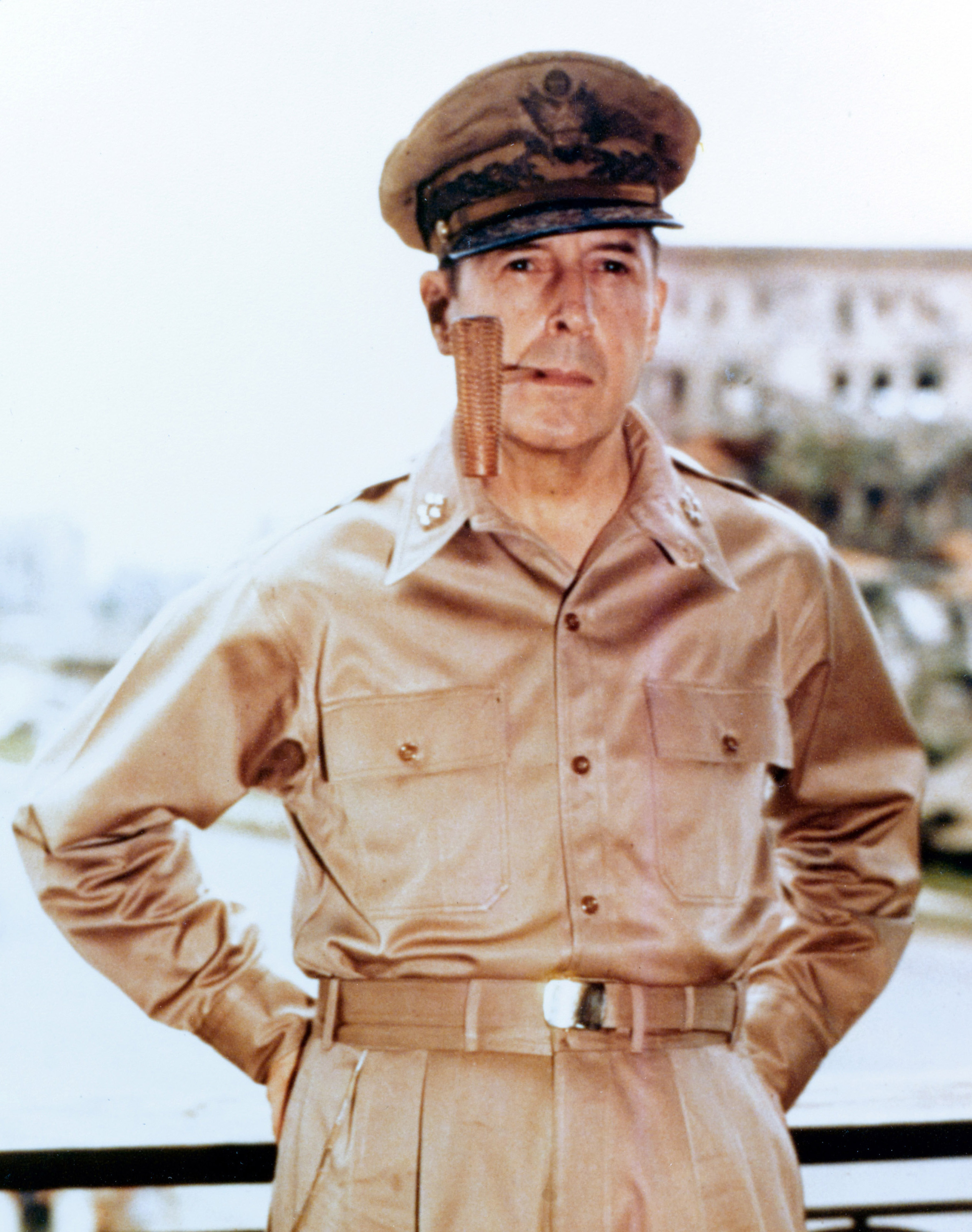
- MacArthur in 1945

Governor of the Ryukyu Islands
- In office 15 December 1950 – 11 April 1951
- Preceded by: Position established
- Succeeded by: Matthew Ridgway

Commander of the United Nations Command
- In office 7 July 1950 – 11 April 1951
- President: Harry S. Truman
- Preceded by: Position established
- Succeeded by: Matthew Ridgway

Commander of the Far East Command
- In office 1 January 1947 – 11 April 1951
- President: Harry S. Truman
- Preceded by: Position established
- Succeeded by: Matthew Ridgway

1st Supreme Commander for the Allied Powers
- In office 14 August 1945 – 11 April 1951
- President: Harry S. Truman
- Preceded by: Position established
- Succeeded by: Matthew Ridgway

United States Military Advisor to the Philippines
- In office 21 December 1935 – 26 July 1941
- Preceded by: Position established
- Succeeded by: Position abolished

13th Chief of Staff of the Army
- In office 21 November 1930 – 1 October 1935
- President: Herbert Hoover; Franklin D. Roosevelt
- Preceded by: Charles P. Summerall
- Succeeded by: Malin Craig

Commander of the Philippine Department
- In office 1 October 1928 – 2 October 1930
- Preceded by: William Lassiter
- Succeeded by: John L. Hines

16th Superintendent of the United States Military Academy
- In office June 12, 1919 – June 30, 1922
- Preceded by: Samuel Escue Tillman
- Succeeded by: Fred Winchester Sladen

Personal details
- Born: 26 January 1880 Little Rock, Arkansas, U.S.
- Died: 5 April 1964 (aged 84) Washington, D.C., U.S.
- Resting place: MacArthur Memorial
- Party: Republican
- Spouses: Louise Cromwell Brooks (m. 1922; div. 1929) Jean Faircloth (m. 1937)
- Children: Arthur MacArthur IV
- Parent: Arthur MacArthur Jr. (father)
- Relatives: MacArthur family
- Education: United States Military Academy
- Civilian awards: Congressional Gold Medal; Thanks of Congress
- Nicknames: Dugout Doug; Big Chief

Military service
- Allegiance: United States; Philippines
- Branch/service: United States Army; Philippine Army
- Years of service: 1903–1964
- Rank: General of the Army (U.S. Army); Field Marshal (Philippine Army)
- Commands: United Nations Command; Far East Command; Supreme Commander for the Allied Powers; U.S. Army Forces Pacific; Southwest Pacific Area; U.S. Army Forces Far East; Philippine Department; U.S. Army Chief of Staff; Philippine Division; U.S. Military Academy Superintendent; 42nd Division; 84th Infantry Brigade
- Battles/wars: See list: Philippine–American War; Post-war insurgency; Banana Wars; Occupation of Veracruz; World War I; Lunéville-Baccarat Defensive Campaign; Champagne-Marne Offensive; Battle of Saint-Mihiel; Meuse–Argonne offensive; World War II; Philippines campaign (1941–1942); Battle of Bataan; Battle of Timor; Battle of the Coral Sea; New Guinea campaign; Huon Peninsula campaign; Battle of Sio; Kokoda Track campaign; Operation Cartwheel; Salamaua–Lae campaign; Landing at Nadzab; Solomon Islands campaign; Bougainville campaign; New Britain campaign; Admiralty Islands campaign; New Georgia campaign; Philippines campaign (1944–1945); Battle of Leyte; Battle of Ormoc Bay; Battle of Luzon; Battle of Manila; Borneo campaign; Occupation of Japan; Korean War; Battle of Pusan Perimeter; Battle of Taegu; Battle of P'ohang-dong; Battle of Inchon; Pusan Perimeter offensive; Second Battle of Seoul; UN Offensive, 1950; UN offensive into North Korea; Second Phase Offensive; UN Offensive, 1951; Battle of the Ch'ongch'on River; Battle of Chosin Reservoir; UN retreat from North Korea; Hungnam evacuation; Third Battle of Seoul; Operation Thunderbolt (1951); Operation Roundup (1951); Battle of Hoengsong; Third Battle of Wonju; Operation Killer; Operation Ripper; Operation Courageous; Operation Rugged
- Military awards: Medal of Honor; Distinguished Service Cross (3); Army Distinguished Service Medal (5); Navy Distinguished Service Medal; Silver Star (7); Distinguished Flying Cross; Bronze Star with valor; Air Medal; Purple Heart (2); Taegeuk Order of Military Merit; Full list
- Douglas MacArthur's voice The final words of Douglas MacArthur's final address to a joint session of the United States Congress. (recorded 1951)

Douglas MacArthur (26 January 1880 – 5 April 1964) was an American general. He served with distinction in World War I; as chief of staff of the United States Army from 1930 to 1935; as Supreme Commander, Southwest Pacific Area, from 1942 to 1945; as Supreme Commander for the Allied Powers overseeing the occupation of Japan from 1945 to 1951; and as head of the United Nations Command in the Korean War from 1950 to 1951. He is one of only five people to hold the rank of General of the Army, and the only person to hold the rank of Field Marshal in the Philippine Army.

MacArthur, a son of Medal of Honor recipient Arthur MacArthur Jr., graduated first in his class from the U.S. Military Academy in 1903. During the 1914 U.S. occupation of Veracruz, he conducted a reconnaissance mission for which he was nominated for the Medal of Honor. On the Western Front during World War I, he rose to the rank of brigadier general, was again nominated for a Medal of Honor, and was awarded the Distinguished Service Cross twice and the Silver Star seven times. From 1919 to 1922, MacArthur served as Superintendent of the U.S. Military Academy. His next posting was in the Philippines, where in 1924 he was instrumental in quelling the Philippine Scout Mutiny. In 1925, MacArthur became the Army's youngest major general at the age of 45, and in 1930 was appointed Chief of Staff of the U.S. Army. He was involved in the controversial expulsion of the Bonus Army protesters in Washington, D.C., in 1932, and organized the Civilian Conservation Corps. In 1935, MacArthur was appointed Military Advisor to the Commonwealth of the Philippines. He retired from the Army in 1937, but continued as an advisor and as a Field Marshal in the Philippine Army from 1936.

MacArthur was recalled to active duty in 1941 as commander of U.S. Army Forces in the Far East. A large portion of his air forces were destroyed in December 1941 in the Japanese attack on Clark Field, and an invasion of the Philippines followed. In March 1942, MacArthur escaped to Australia, where he was appointed Supreme Commander of the Southwest Pacific Area in April. He promised that he would return to the Philippines, and for his defense of the islands was awarded the Medal of Honor. From Australia, he commanded the New Guinea campaign, and in October 1944 led the campaign which liberated the Philippines. In December 1944, he was promoted to General of the Army.

At the end of the war, MacArthur accepted the surrender of Japan. As the Supreme Commander for the Allied Powers and effective ruler of Japan, he oversaw the war crimes tribunals and the demilitarization and democratization of the country. During the Korean War, he led the United Nations Command with initial success, but suffered major defeats after China's entry into the war in October 1950. MacArthur was contentiously removed from his command in Korea by President Harry S. Truman in April 1951. He died in Washington, D.C., in 1964.

== Early life and education ==
A military brat, Douglas MacArthur was born 26 January 1880, at Little Rock Barracks in Arkansas, to Arthur MacArthur Jr., a U.S. Army captain, and Mary Pinkney Hardy MacArthur (nicknamed "Pinky"). Arthur Jr. received the Medal of Honor for his actions with the Union Army in the Battle of Missionary Ridge during the American Civil War, and was promoted to lieutenant general. Arthur and Pinky had three sons, of whom Douglas was the youngest, following Arthur III and Malcolm. The family lived on a succession of Army posts in the American Old West. Conditions were primitive, and Malcolm died of measles in 1883. In his memoir, MacArthur wrote "I learned to ride and shoot even before I could read or write—indeed, almost before I could walk and talk." Douglas was extremely close with his mother and often considered a "mama's boy". Until around age eight, she dressed him in skirts and kept his hair long and in curls.

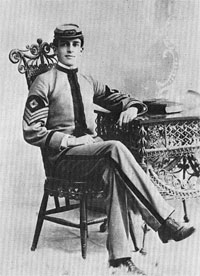
MacArthur as a student at West Texas Military Academy in the late 1890s

In July 1889 the family moved to Washington, D.C., where MacArthur attended the Force Public School. His father was posted to San Antonio, Texas, in September 1893. MacArthur attended the West Texas Military Academy, where he was awarded the gold medal for "scholarship and deportment". He played on the school tennis team, quarterback on its football team, and shortstop on its baseball team. He was named valedictorian, with a final year average of 97.33%. MacArthur's father and grandfather unsuccessfully sought to secure Douglas a presidential appointment to the United States Military Academy at West Point, first from Grover Cleveland and then from William McKinley; both were rejected. He later passed the examination for an appointment from Congressman Theobald Otjen. He later wrote: "It was a lesson I never forgot. Preparedness is the key to success and victory."

MacArthur entered West Point on 13 June 1899, and his mother moved to a suite at Craney's Hotel, which overlooked the grounds of the academy. Hazing was widespread at West Point at this time, and MacArthur and his classmate Ulysses S. Grant III were singled out by Southern cadets as sons of generals with mothers living at Craney's. When Cadet Oscar Booz left West Point after being hazed and subsequently died of tuberculosis, MacArthur was called to appear before a special congressional inquiry, where he testified against cadets implicated in hazing but downplayed his own hazing. Congress subsequently outlawed acts "of a harassing, tyrannical, abusive, shameful, insulting or humiliating nature", although hazing continued.

MacArthur was a corporal in Company B in his second year, a first sergeant in Company A in his third year and First Captain in his final year. He played for the baseball team and academically earned 2424.12 merits out of a possible 2470.00 or 98.14%, the third-highest score ever recorded. He graduated first in his class on 11 June 1903. At the time it was customary for the top-ranking cadets to be commissioned into the United States Army Corps of Engineers; therefore, MacArthur was commissioned as a second lieutenant in that corps.

== Junior officer ==
MacArthur spent his graduation furlough with his parents at Fort Mason, California, where his father, now a major general, was commanding the Department of the Pacific. Afterward, he joined the 3rd Engineer Battalion, which departed for the Philippines in October 1903. MacArthur was sent to Iloilo, where he supervised the construction of a wharf at Camp Jossman. He conducted surveys at Tacloban City, Calbayog and Cebu City. In November 1903, while working on Guimaras, he was ambushed by a pair of Filipino brigands or guerrillas; he killed both. He was promoted to first lieutenant in Manila in April 1904. In October 1904, his tour of duty was cut short when he contracted malaria and dhobi itch during a survey on Bataan. He returned to San Francisco, where he was assigned to the California Debris Commission. In July 1905, he became chief engineer of the Division of the Pacific.

In October 1905, MacArthur was appointed aide-de-camp to his father in Tokyo. A man who knew the MacArthurs at this time wrote that "Arthur MacArthur was the most flamboyantly egotistical man I had ever seen, until I met his son." They inspected Japanese military bases at Nagasaki, Kobe and Kyoto, then headed to India via Shanghai, Hong Kong, Java and Singapore, reaching Calcutta in January 1906. In India, they visited Madras, Tuticorin, Quetta, Karachi, the Northwest Frontier and the Khyber Pass. They then sailed to China via Bangkok and Saigon, and toured Canton, Qingdao, Beijing, Tianjin, Hankou and Shanghai before returning to Japan in June. The next month they returned to Fort Mason in the U.S. In September, Douglas received orders to report to the 2nd Engineer Battalion at the Washington Barracks and enroll in the Engineer School. While there he served as "an aide to assist at White House functions" at the request of President Theodore Roosevelt.

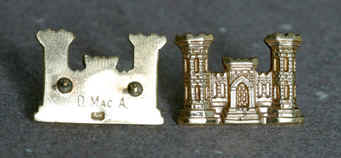
MacArthur was an engineer for the first 14 years of his military career. He received these golden castle pins as a gift upon graduation. He carried these pins with him for over 40 years and in 1945 gave them to Major General Leif J. Sverdrup, whom he thought more deserving to wear them. Sverdrup gave them to the Chief of Engineers in 1975. Every Chief of Engineers since then has worn MacArthur's pins.

In August 1907, MacArthur was sent to the engineer district office in Milwaukee, where his parents were living. In April 1908, he was posted to Fort Leavenworth, where he was given his first command, Company K, 3rd Engineer Battalion. He became battalion adjutant in 1909 and then engineer officer at Fort Leavenworth in 1910. MacArthur was promoted to captain in February 1911 and was appointed as head of the Military Engineering Department and the Field Engineer School. He participated in exercises at San Antonio, Texas, with the Maneuver Division in 1911 and served in Panama on detached duty in January and February 1912. The sudden death of their father on 5 September 1912 brought Douglas and his brother Arthur back to Milwaukee to care for their mother, whose health had deteriorated. MacArthur requested a transfer to Washington, D.C., so his mother could be near Johns Hopkins Hospital. Army Chief of Staff, Major General Leonard Wood, took up the matter with Secretary of War Henry L. Stimson, who arranged for MacArthur to be posted to the Office of the Chief of Staff in 1912.

== Veracruz expedition ==
On 21 April 1914, President Woodrow Wilson ordered the occupation of Veracruz. MacArthur joined the headquarters staff sent to the area, arriving on 1 May 1914. He realized that the logistic support of an advance would require the railroad, and set out to verify a report that there were locomotives in Alvarado, accompanied by three Mexicans. After locating three suitable engines, on the way back to Veracruz his party was set upon by five armed men. The party escaped all but two, whom MacArthur shot. Soon after, they were attacked by about fifteen horsemen. MacArthur took three bullets in his clothes but was unharmed. One of his companions was lightly wounded before the horsemen retired, after MacArthur shot four of them. The party was attacked a third time by three horsemen. MacArthur received another bullet hole in his shirt, but his men managed to outrun all but one of their attackers. MacArthur shot both that man and his horse.

A fellow officer wrote to Wood recommending that MacArthur be put forward for the Medal of Honor. Wood did so, and Chief of Staff Hugh L. Scott convened a board to consider the award. The board feared that "to bestow the award recommended might encourage another staff officer, under similar conditions, to ignore the local commander, possibly interfering with the latter's plans". Consequently, MacArthur received no award.

== World War I ==
=== Rainbow Division ===
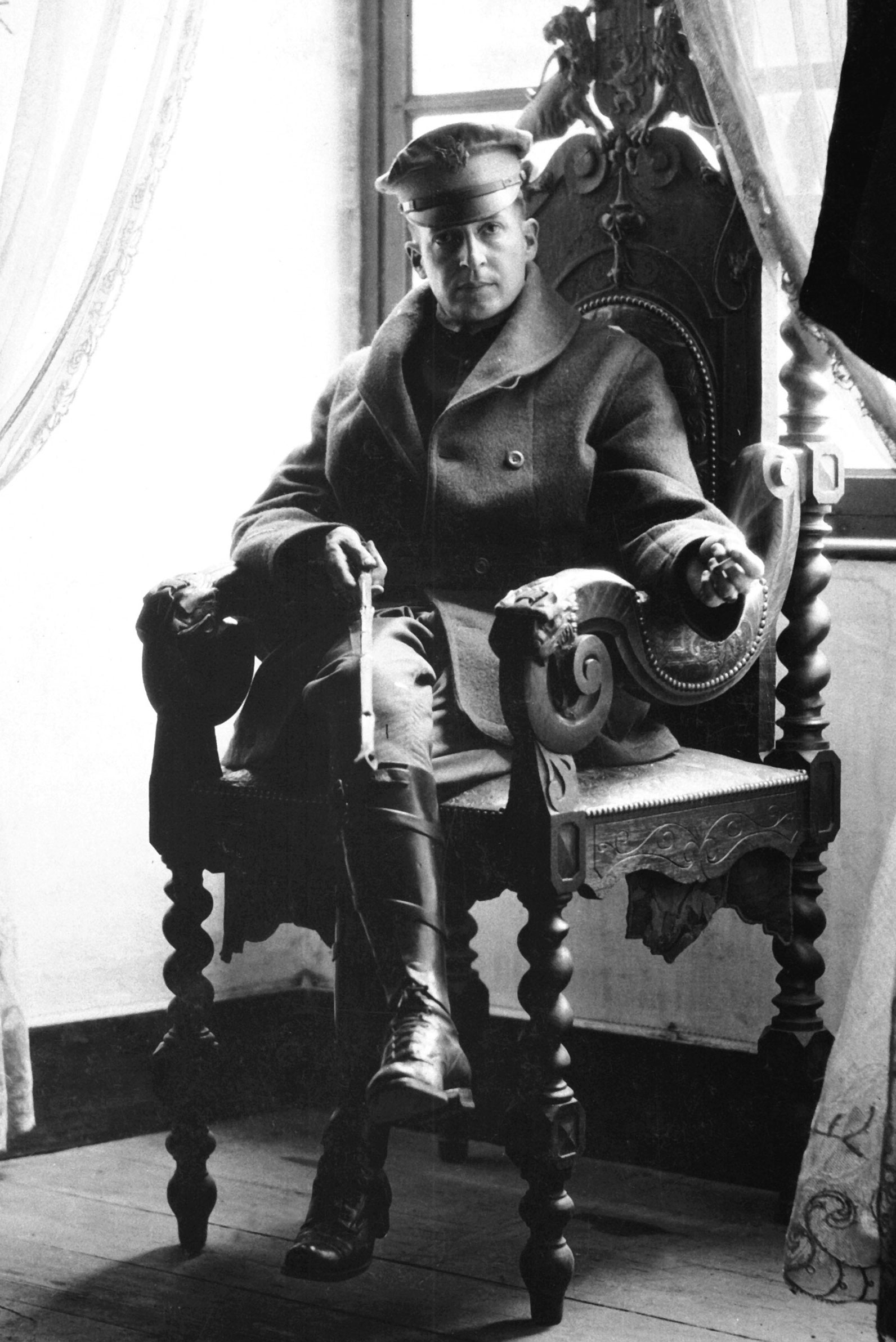
Brigadier General MacArthur holding a riding crop at a French château, September 1918

MacArthur returned to the War Department, where he was promoted to major on 11 December 1915. In June 1916, he was assigned as head of the Bureau of Information. MacArthur has been regarded as the Army's first press officer.

Following the American entry into World War I, MacArthur and Secretary of War Newton D. Baker secured an agreement from President Wilson for the use of the National Guard on the Western Front. MacArthur suggested sending first a division organized from units of different states, so as to avoid the appearance of favoritism toward any state. Baker approved the creation of this formation, which became the 42nd ("Rainbow") Division and appointed Major General William Abram Mann as its commander; MacArthur was its chief of staff, and with his new role came the rank of colonel, skipping the rank of lieutenant colonel. At MacArthur's request, this commission was in the infantry rather than the engineers.

The 42nd Division's initial training emphasized open-field combat rather than trench warfare. It sailed for the Western Front on 18 October 1917. On 19 December, Mann was replaced by Major General Charles T. Menoher after Mann–who was "ill, old, and bedridden"– failed a physical examination. The new division commander and his chief of staff "became great friends", in MacArthur's words, who described Menoher as "an able officer, an efficient administrator, of genial disposition and unimpeachable character".

=== Lunéville-Baccarat Defensive sector ===
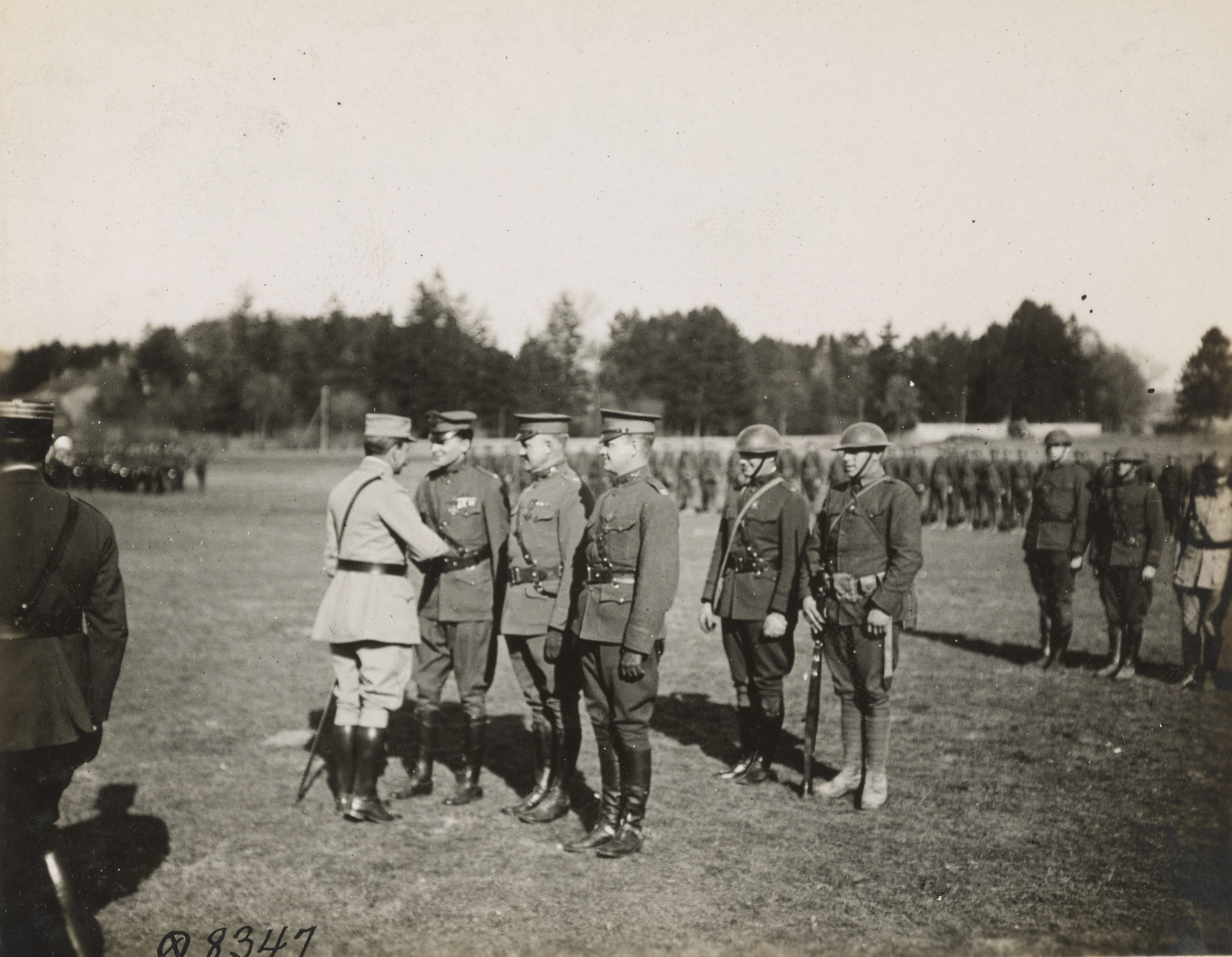
French General Georges de Bazelaire decorates MacArthur with the Croix de Guerre, 18 March 1918

The 42nd Division entered the line in the quiet Lunéville sector in February 1918. On 26 February, MacArthur accompanied a French trench raid and assisted in the capture of German prisoners. The commander of the French VII Corps, Major General Georges de Bazelaire, decorated MacArthur with the Croix de Guerre. This was the first Croix de Guerre awarded to a member of the American Expeditionary Forces (AEF). Menoher recommended MacArthur for a Silver Star, which he later received.

On 9 March, the 42nd Division launched three raids on German trenches in the Salient du Feys. MacArthur accompanied a company of the 168th Infantry. His leadership was rewarded with the Distinguished Service Cross. A few days later, MacArthur, who was strict about his men carrying their gas masks but often neglected to bring his own, was gassed. He recovered in time to show Secretary Baker around the area on 19 March.

=== Champagne-Marne offensive ===
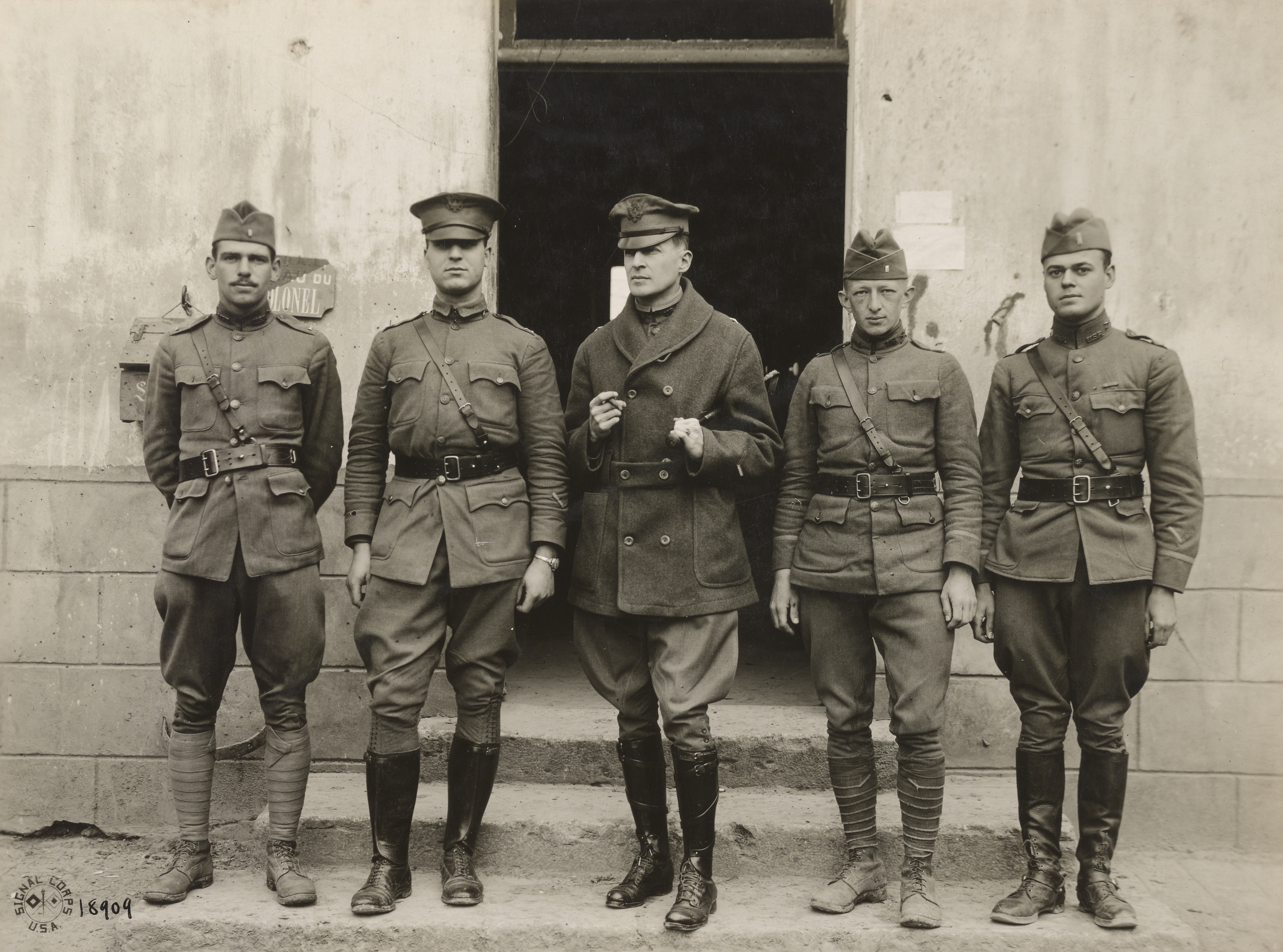
MacArthur (center) in his unauthorized uniform. He never wore a helmet, even in no man's land, and wore a modified cap.

On the recommendation of Menoher, MacArthur was promoted to brigadier general on 26 June. This made him, at 38, the youngest general in the AEF until October when Lesley J. McNair and Pelham D. Glassford, both 35, received promotion.

Around the same time, the 42nd Division was shifted to Châlons-en-Champagne to oppose the German Champagne-Marne offensive. Général d'Armée Henri Gouraud of the French Fourth Army elected to meet the attack with a defense in depth. His plan succeeded, and MacArthur was awarded a second Silver Star. The 42nd Division participated in the subsequent Allied counter-offensive, and MacArthur was awarded a third Silver Star on 29 July.

Two days later, Menoher relieved Brigadier General Robert A. Brown of the 84th Infantry Brigade of his command and replaced him with MacArthur. Hearing reports that the enemy had withdrawn, MacArthur went forward on 2 August to see for himself. He later wrote:

I will never forget that trip. The dead were so thick in spots we tumbled over them. There must have been at least 2,000 of those sprawled bodies. I identified the insignia of six of the best German divisions. The stench was suffocating. Not a tree was standing. The moans and cries of wounded men sounded everywhere. Sniper bullets sung like the buzzing of a hive of angry bees.

MacArthur reported to Menoher and Major General Hunter Liggett, the commander of I Corps, that the Germans had indeed withdrawn. He was awarded a fourth Silver Star, a second Croix de guerre, and was made a commandeur of the Légion d'honneur.

=== Battle of Saint-Mihiel and Meuse-Argonne offensive ===
The 42nd Division earned a few weeks rest, returning to the line for the Battle of Saint-Mihiel on 12 September 1918. The Allied advance proceeded rapidly, and MacArthur was awarded a fifth Silver Star for his leadership of the 84th Infantry Brigade. He received a sixth for his participation in a raid on the night of 25–26 September. The 42nd Division was relieved on the night of 30 September and moved to the Argonne sector where it relieved the 1st Division on the night of 11 October. On a reconnaissance the next day, MacArthur was gassed again, earning a second Wound Chevron.

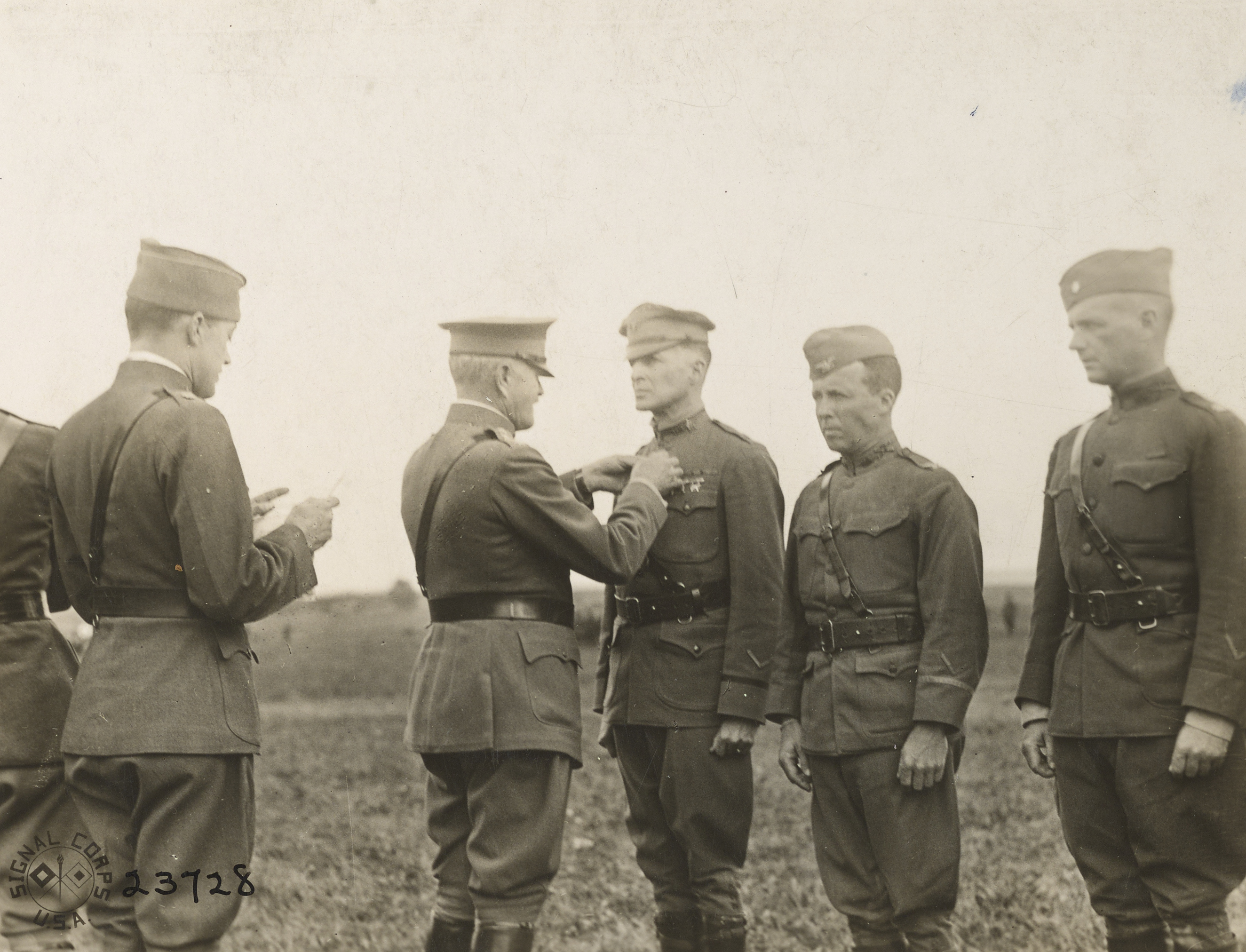
General John J. Pershing (second from left) decorates MacArthur with the DSC, October 1918. Major General Charles T. Menoher (left) reads out the citation while Colonel George E. Leach (fourth from left) and Lieutenant Colonel William J. Donovan await their decorations.

The 42nd Division joined the Meuse–Argonne offensive on 14 October. That evening, a conference was called to discuss the attack, during which Major General Charles P. Summerall, commander of V Corps, telephoned and demanded that Châtillon be taken by 18:00 the next evening. An aerial photograph showed a gap in the German barbed wire northeast of Châtillon. Lieutenant Colonel Walter E. Bare—the commander of the 167th Infantry—proposed an attack from that direction, covered by a machine-gun barrage. MacArthur adopted this plan. He was wounded, but not severely, while leading a reconnaissance patrol into no man's land at night to confirm the existence of the gap. The Germans shot at the squad with artillery and machine guns. MacArthur was the sole survivor of the patrol, claiming it was a miracle that he survived. He confirmed that there was indeed an enormous gap due to the lack of enemy gunfire coming from that area.

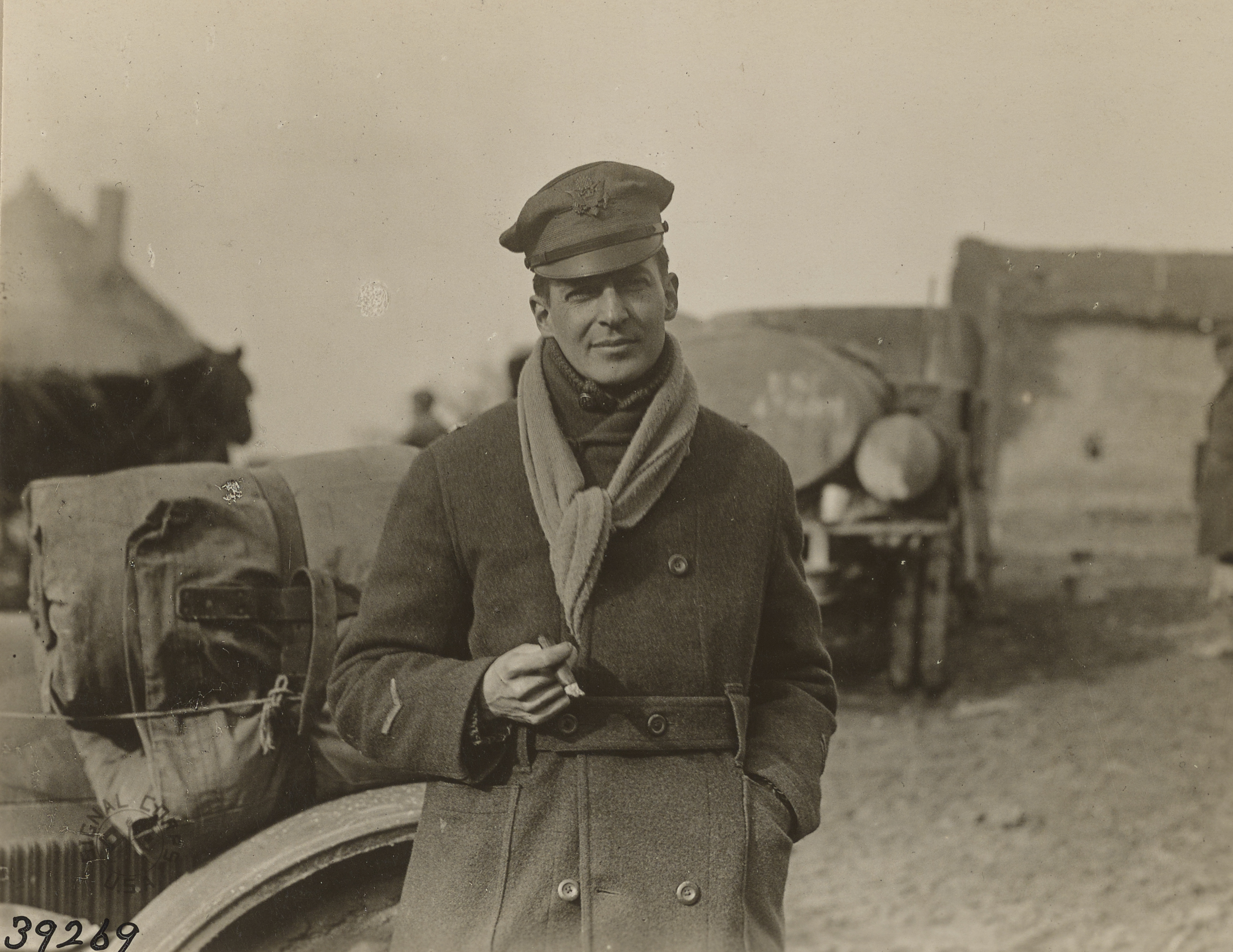
Brigadier General Douglas MacArthur, commanding the 84th Brigade, 42nd Division, standing in front of his staff car, Saint-Juvin, Ardennes, France, 3 November 1918

Summerall nominated MacArthur for the Medal of Honor and promotion to major general, but he received neither. He was awarded a second Distinguished Service Cross. The 42nd Division returned to the line for the last time on the night of 4–5 November 1918, the final advance on Sedan. MacArthur later wrote that this operation "narrowly missed being one of the great tragedies of American history". An order to disregard unit boundaries led to units crossing into each other's zones; MacArthur was taken prisoner by men of the 1st Division, who mistook him for a German general. His performance in the attack on the Meuse heights led to his being awarded a seventh Silver Star. On 10 November, a day before the armistice with Germany, MacArthur was appointed commander of the 42nd Division, upon the recommendation of its outgoing commander, Menoher. For his service as the 42nd's chief of staff and commander of the 84th Infantry Brigade, MacArthur was awarded the Army Distinguished Service Medal.

His period in command of the 42nd Division was brief, for on 22 November he was returned to the 84th Infantry Brigade, with Major General Clement Flagler taking command. It is possible that he may have retained command of the 42nd had he been promoted to major general (making him the youngest in the U.S. Army) but, with the sudden cessation of hostilities, that was unlikely. General Peyton C. March, the Army Chief of Staff, "had put a block on promotions. There would be no more stars awarded while the War Department got to grips with demobilization".

MacArthur was one of only three American generals wounded or killed in action in World War I, and the only one who ranked as a general: Edward Sigerfoos and Albertus W. Catlin became casualties while in the process of being promoted. The 42nd Division was chosen to participate in the occupation of the Rhineland, occupying the Ahrweiler district. In April 1919, the 42nd Division entrained for Brest and Saint-Nazaire, where they boarded ships to the United States. MacArthur reached New York on 25 April 1919.

== Between the wars ==
=== Superintendent of the United States Military Academy ===
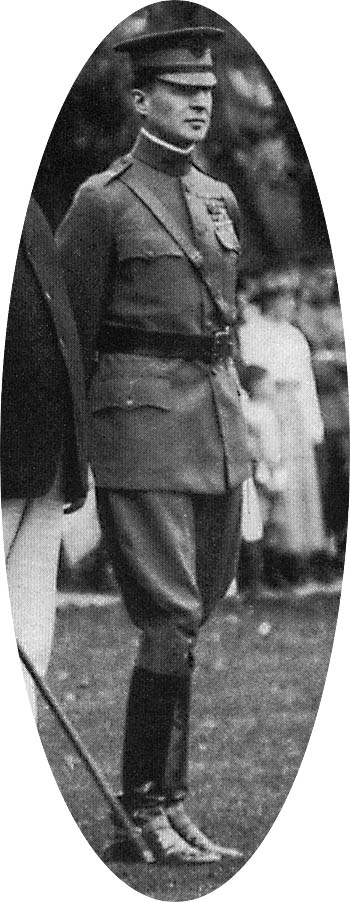
MacArthur as West Point Superintendent

MacArthur's 84th Brigade was demobilized at Camp Dodge, Iowa, on 12 May 1919. The following month, he became Superintendent of the U.S. Military Academy at West Point, which General March felt was much in need of reform. Accepting the post, "one of the most prestigious in the army", allowed MacArthur to retain his rank of brigadier general (which was temporary for the duration of the war), instead of being reduced to his substantive rank of major. When MacArthur moved into the superintendent's house with his mother, he became the youngest superintendent since 1817. He had to overcome resistance from graduates and the academic board.

MacArthur's vision of what was required of an officer came not just from his recent experience of combat, but also the occupation of the Rhineland. The military government of the Rhineland had required the Army to deal with political, economic and social problems, but he had found that many West Point graduates had limited knowledge of fields outside of the military sciences. During the war, West Point had been reduced to little more than an officer candidate school, with five classes being graduated in two years. Cadet and staff morale was low and hazing "at an all-time peak of viciousness".

MacArthur's first change was to restore the four-year course, after Congress had set the course length at three years. During the debate over the length, The New York Times highlighted the cloistered and undemocratic nature of student life at West Point. MacArthur sought to modernize the system, expanding the concept of military character to include bearing, leadership, efficiency and athletic performance. He formalized the hitherto unwritten Cadet Honor Code in 1922 when he formed the Cadet Honor Committee to review alleged code violations. Elected by the cadets, it had no authority to punish, but acted as a kind of grand jury. MacArthur attempted to end hazing by using officers rather than upperclassmen to train the plebes. Instead of the traditional summer camp at Fort Clinton, MacArthur had the cadets trained to use modern weapons by regular army sergeants at Fort Dix; they then marched back to West Point with full packs. He attempted to modernize the curriculum by adding liberal arts, government and economics courses, but encountered strong resistance from the academic board. Study of the campaigns of the American Civil War was replaced with those of World War I. In History class, more emphasis was placed on the Far East. MacArthur expanded the sports program and required all cadets to participate. He allowed upperclassmen to leave the reservation, and sanctioned a cadet newspaper. He also permitted cadets to travel to watch their football team play, and gave them a monthly allowance of $5 (equivalent to $96 in 2025). Professors and alumni alike protested these radical moves. Most of MacArthur's West Point reforms were soon discarded but in the ensuing years his innovations were gradually restored.

=== Army's youngest major general ===
MacArthur became romantically involved with socialite and heiress Louise Cromwell Brooks. They were married at her family's villa in Palm Beach, Florida, on 14 February 1922. Rumors circulated that Pershing, who had also courted Louise, had threatened to exile them to the Philippines if they were married. Pershing denied this. More recently, Richard B. Frank has written that Pershing and Brooks had already "severed" their relationship by the time of MacArthur's transfer; Brooks was, however, "informal[ly]" engaged to a close aide of Pershing's (she broke off the relationship to accept MacArthur's proposal). Pershing's letter concerning MacArthur's transfer predated Brooks's and MacArthur's engagement announcement, though this did not dispel the newspaper gossip. In October 1922, MacArthur sailed to the Philippines with Louise and her two children, Walter and Louise, to assume command of the Military District of Manila. MacArthur was fond of the children, and spent much of his free time with them.

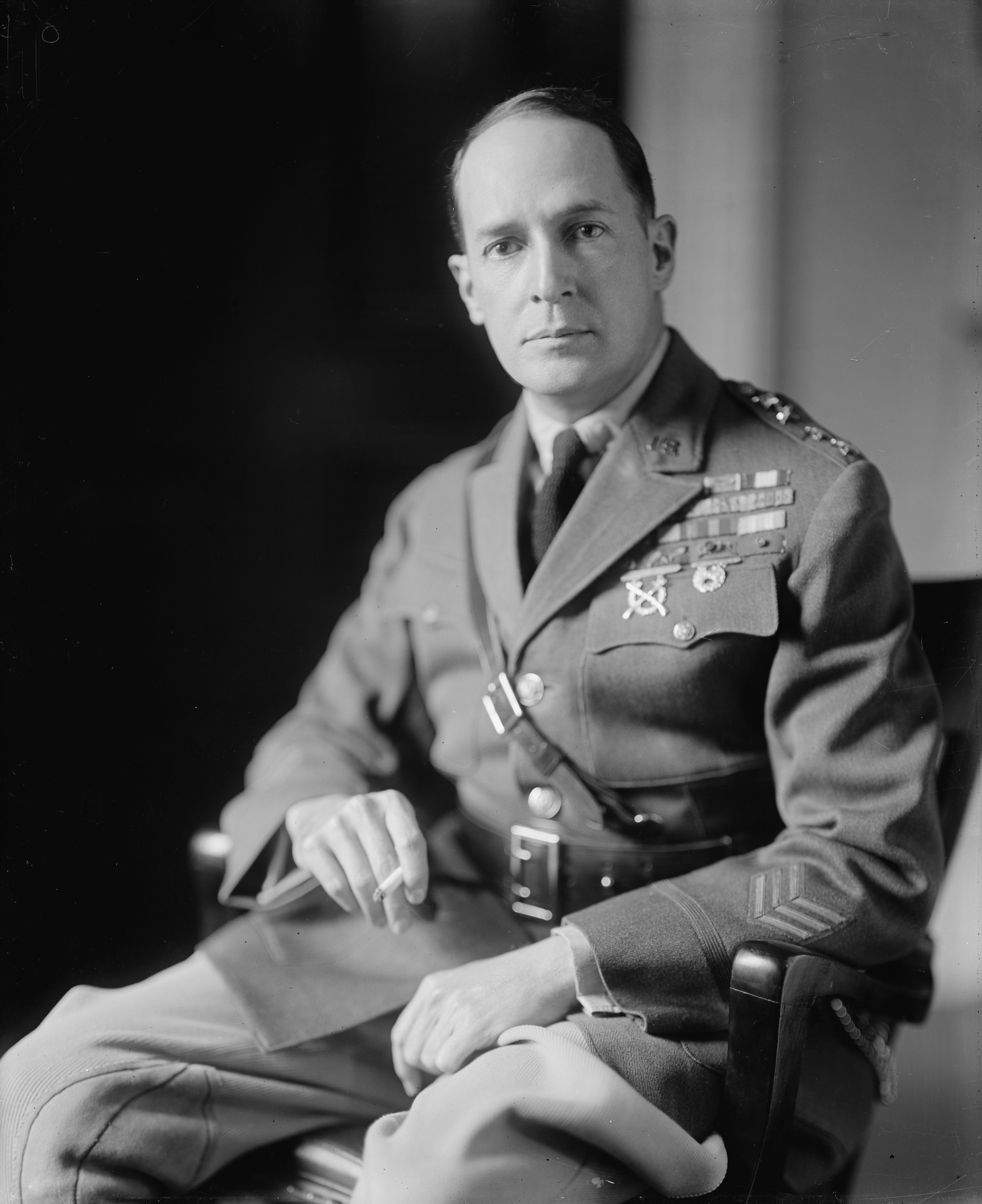
MacArthur c. 1925

MacArthur's friendships with Filipinos like Manuel Quezon offended some people. In February and March 1923 MacArthur returned to Washington to see his mother, who had a heart ailment. She recovered, but it was the last time he saw his brother Arthur, who died suddenly from appendicitis in December 1923. In June 1923, MacArthur assumed command of the 23rd Infantry Brigade of the Philippine Division. On 7 July 1924, he was informed that a mutiny had broken out amongst the Philippine Scouts over grievances concerning pay and allowances. Over 200 were arrested and there were fears of an insurrection. MacArthur was able to calm the situation, but his subsequent efforts to improve salaries were frustrated by financial stringency and racial prejudice. On 17 January 1925, at the age of 44, he became the Army's youngest major general.

Returning to the U.S., MacArthur took command of the IV Corps Area, based at Fort McPherson in Atlanta, Georgia, on 2 May 1925. However, he encountered southern prejudice because he was the son of a Union Army officer, and he requested to be relieved. A few months later, he assumed command of the III Corps area, based at Fort McHenry in Baltimore, Maryland. The transfer allowed MacArthur and Louise to move to her Rainbow Hill estate, near Garrison, Maryland. However, this relocation led to what he later described as "one of the most distasteful orders I ever received": to serve on the court-martial of Brigadier General Billy Mitchell. Three of the thirteen judges, including Summerall, the president of the court, were removed when defense challenges revealed bias against Mitchell. Despite MacArthur's claim that he had voted to acquit, Mitchell was convicted.

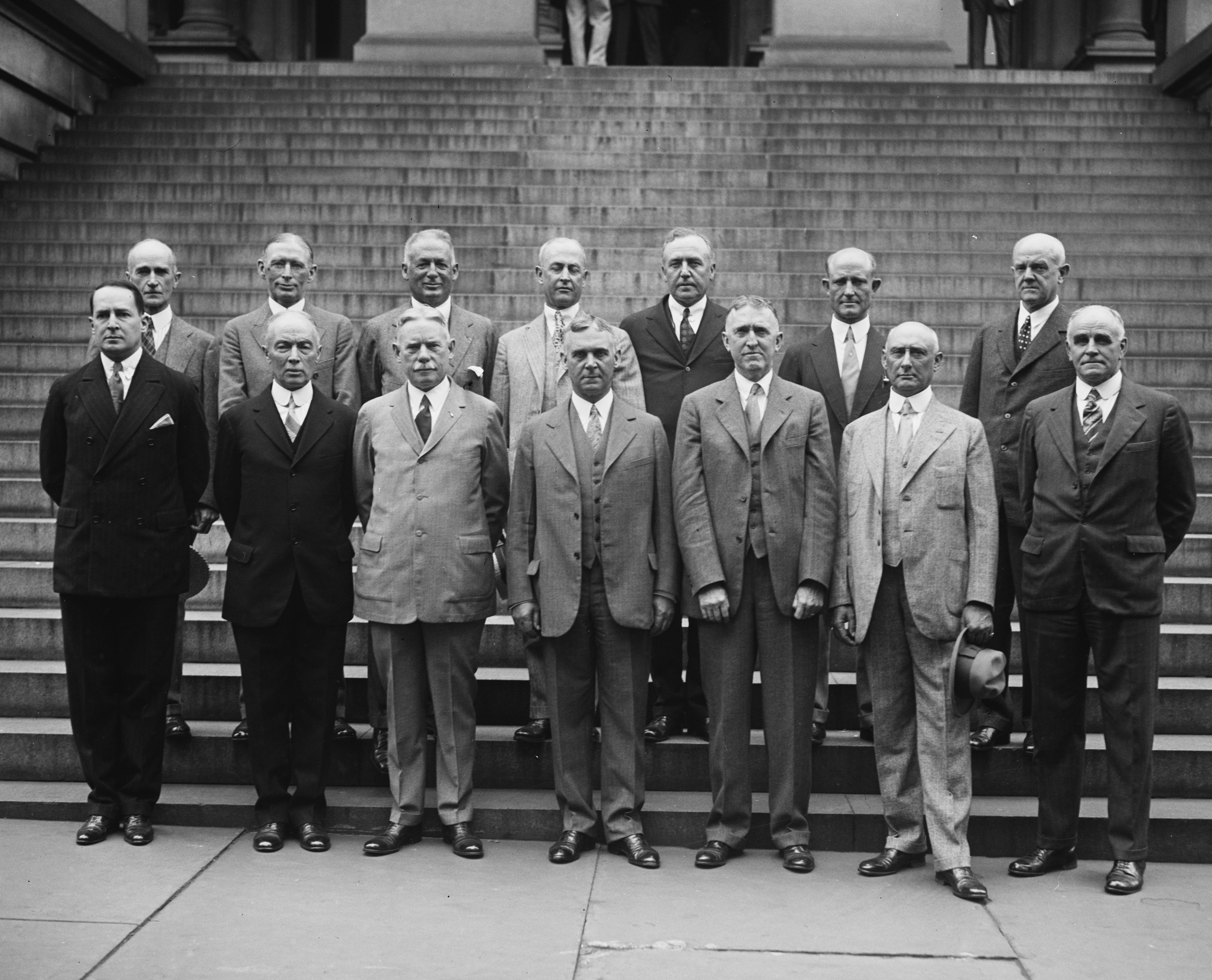
Corps area commanders and division commanders meet with the army chief of staff, Major General Charles Pelot Summerall, at the War Department, May 1927. Stood in the front row, first on the left, is Major General Douglas MacArthur, commanding the Third Corps Area.

In 1927, MacArthur and Louise separated, and she moved to a Manhattan hotel. In August that year, William C. Prout—the president of the American Olympic Committee—died suddenly and the committee elected MacArthur as their president. His main task was to prepare the U.S. team for the 1928 Summer Olympics in Amsterdam, where the Americans won the most medals. Upon returning to the U.S., MacArthur received orders to assume command of the Philippine Department. He travelled alone; on 17 June 1929, while he was in Manila, Louise obtained a divorce. Both later acknowledged the reason to be "incompatibility".

=== Chief of Staff ===
By 1930, MacArthur was 50 and still the youngest and one of the best known of the U.S. Army's major generals. He left the Philippines on 19 September 1930 and for a brief time commanded the IX Corps Area in San Francisco. On 21 November, he was sworn in as Chief of Staff of the United States Army, with the rank of general. While in Washington, he rode home each day to have lunch with his mother. At his desk, he would wear a Japanese ceremonial kimono, cool himself with an oriental fan, and smoke cigarettes in a jeweled cigarette holder. In the evenings, he liked to read military history. He began referring to himself as "MacArthur". He had already hired a public relations staff to promote his image with the American public, together with a set of beliefs: that America needed a strongman leader to deal with the possibility that Communists might lead the masses of unemployed into a revolution; that America's destiny was in the Asia-Pacific region; and a strong hostility to the British Empire. One contemporary described MacArthur as the greatest actor to ever serve as a U.S. Army general while another wrote that MacArthur had a court rather than a staff.

The Great Depression prompted Congress to cut the Army's personnel and budget: 53 bases were closed, but MacArthur prevented attempts to reduce the number of regular officers from 12,000 to 10,000. His main programs included the development of new mobilization plans. He grouped the nine corps areas together under four armies, which were charged with training and frontier defense. He also negotiated the MacArthur-Pratt agreement with the Chief of Naval Operations, William V. Pratt. This was the first of a series of inter-service agreements that defined the responsibilities of the different services with respect to aviation. This agreement placed coastal air defense under the Army. In March 1935, MacArthur activated a centralized air command, General Headquarters Air Force, under General Frank M. Andrews.

By rapidly promoting Andrews from lieutenant colonel to brigadier general MacArthur supported Andrews' endorsement of the Boeing B-17 Flying Fortress and the concept of long-range four-engine bombers. Most high-ranking Army generals and officials in the War Department at the time supported twin-engine bombers. After MacArthur left his position as Army Chief of Staff in October 1935 his successor, Malin Craig, and War Secretary Harry Hines Woodring ordered a halt to development of the B-17. Andrews, thanks to MacArthur putting him in a position of power in 1935, was able to use bureaucratic loopholes to covertly order development of the B-17 to the point that when the Army and President Franklin Roosevelt endorsed four-engine bombers in 1940, B-17s were able to be immediately produced.

The development of the M1 Garand rifle also happened during MacArthur's tenure. Many in the Army and Marine Corps wanted the new rifle to use the .276 Pedersen round. MacArthur personally ordered that the Garand use the .30-06 Springfield round, which was what the M1903 Springfield used; this allowed the military to use the same ammunition for both. The Garand was cleared for service in November 1935 and officially adopted in January 1936 as the new Army service rifle a few months after MacArthur finished his tour of duty as chief of staff.

==== Bonus Army ====
One of MacArthur's most controversial acts came in 1932, when the Bonus Army of veterans converged on Washington. He sent camp equipment to the demonstrators, along with mobile kitchens, until an outburst in Congress caused the kitchens to be withdrawn. He was concerned that the demonstration had been taken over by communists and pacifists but the General Staff's intelligence division reported that only three of the march's 26 key leaders were communists. MacArthur went over contingency plans for civil disorder: mechanized equipment was brought to Fort Myer, where anti-riot training was conducted.

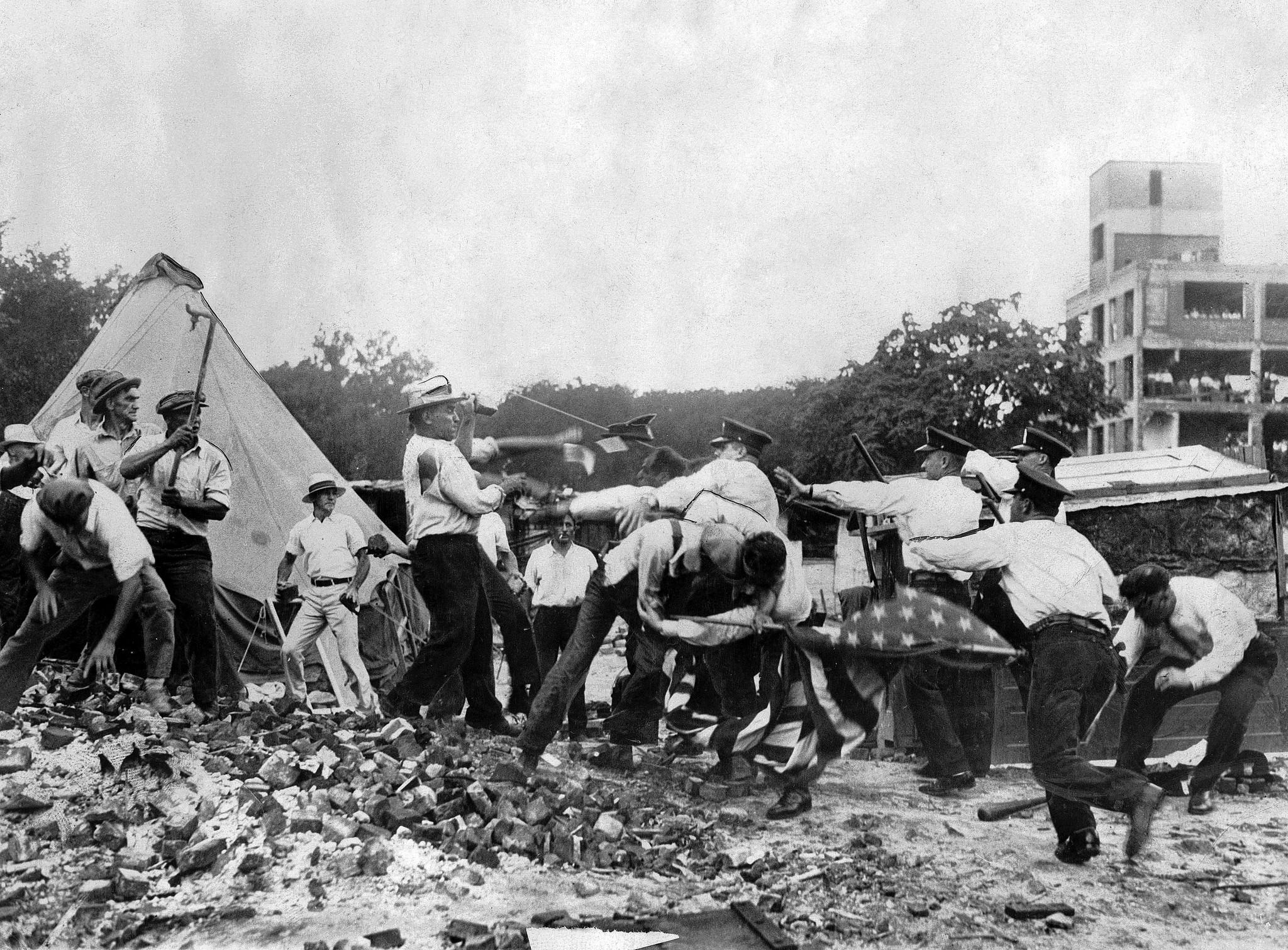
Bonus Army marchers confront the police.

On 28 July 1932, in a clash with the District police, two veterans were shot, and later died. President Herbert Hoover ordered MacArthur to "surround the affected area and clear it without delay". MacArthur brought up troops and tanks and, against the advice of Major Dwight D. Eisenhower, decided to accompany the troops, although he was not in charge of the operation. The troops advanced with bayonets and sabers drawn under a shower of bricks and rocks, but no shots were fired. In less than four hours, they cleared the campground using tear gas. The gas canisters started fires, causing the only death during the riots. While not as violent as other anti-riot operations, it was nevertheless a public relations disaster. However, the defeat of the "Bonus Army", while unpopular with the American people at large, did make MacArthur into the hero of the more right-wing elements in the Republican Party who believed that the general had saved America from a communist revolution.

In 1934, MacArthur sued journalists Drew Pearson and Robert S. Allen for defamation after they described his treatment of the Bonus marchers as "unwarranted, unnecessary, insubordinate, harsh and brutal". Also accused for proposing 19-gun salutes for friends, MacArthur asked for $750,000 (equivalent to $14.1 million in 2025) for the damage to his reputation. The journalists threatened to call Isabel Rosario Cooper as a witness. MacArthur had met Isabel while in the Philippines, and she had become his mistress. He was forced to settle out of court, secretly paying Pearson $15,000 (equivalent to $282,000 in 2025).

==== New Deal ====
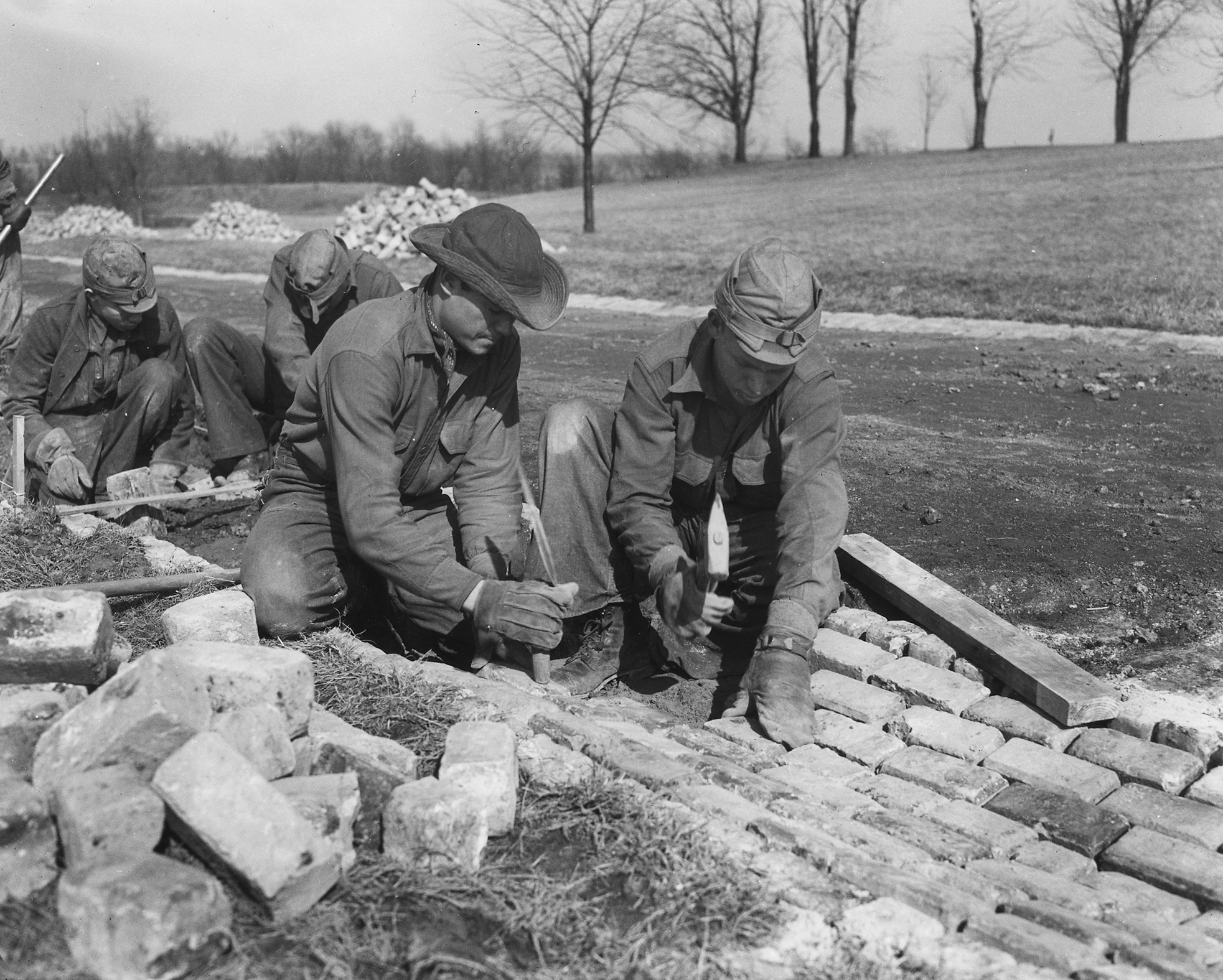
Civilian Conservation Corps workers on a project alongside a road

Roosevelt won the 1932 presidential election. MacArthur and Roosevelt had worked together before World War I and had remained friends despite their political differences. MacArthur supported the New Deal through the Army's operation of the Civilian Conservation Corps. He decentralized its administration to the corps areas, which became an important factor in the program's success. His support for a strong military, and his public criticism of isolationism, made him unpopular with the Roosevelt administration.

Perhaps the most incendiary exchange between Roosevelt and MacArthur occurred over a proposal to cut 51% of the Army's budget. MacArthur lectured Roosevelt that "when we lost the next war, and an American boy, lying in the mud with an enemy bayonet through his belly and an enemy foot on his dying throat, spat out his last curse, I wanted the name not to be MacArthur, but Roosevelt". Roosevelt yelled, "you must not talk that way to the President!" MacArthur offered to resign, but Roosevelt refused.

In spite of such exchanges, MacArthur was extended an extra year as chief of staff, ending his tour in October 1935. For his service as chief of staff, he was awarded a second Distinguished Service Medal. He was retroactively awarded two Purple Hearts for his World War I service, a decoration that he authorized in 1932. MacArthur insisted on being the first recipient of the Purple Heart.

=== Field Marshal of the Philippine Army ===
When the Commonwealth of the Philippines achieved semi-independent status in 1935, President of the Philippines Manuel Quezon asked his longtime friend MacArthur to supervise the creation of a Philippine Army. With President Roosevelt's approval, MacArthur accepted. It was agreed that MacArthur would receive the rank of field marshal, with its salary and allowances, in addition to his major general's salary as Military Advisor to the Commonwealth Government of the Philippines. This made him the best-paid soldier in the world. MacArthur sailed from San Francisco on the SS President Hoover in October 1935, accompanied by his mother and sister-in-law. He brought Eisenhower and Major James B. Ord as his assistants. Another passenger on the President Hoover was Jean Marie Faircloth, an unmarried 37-year-old socialite. Over the next two years, MacArthur and Faircloth were frequently seen together. His mother became gravely ill during the voyage and died in Manila on 3 December 1935.

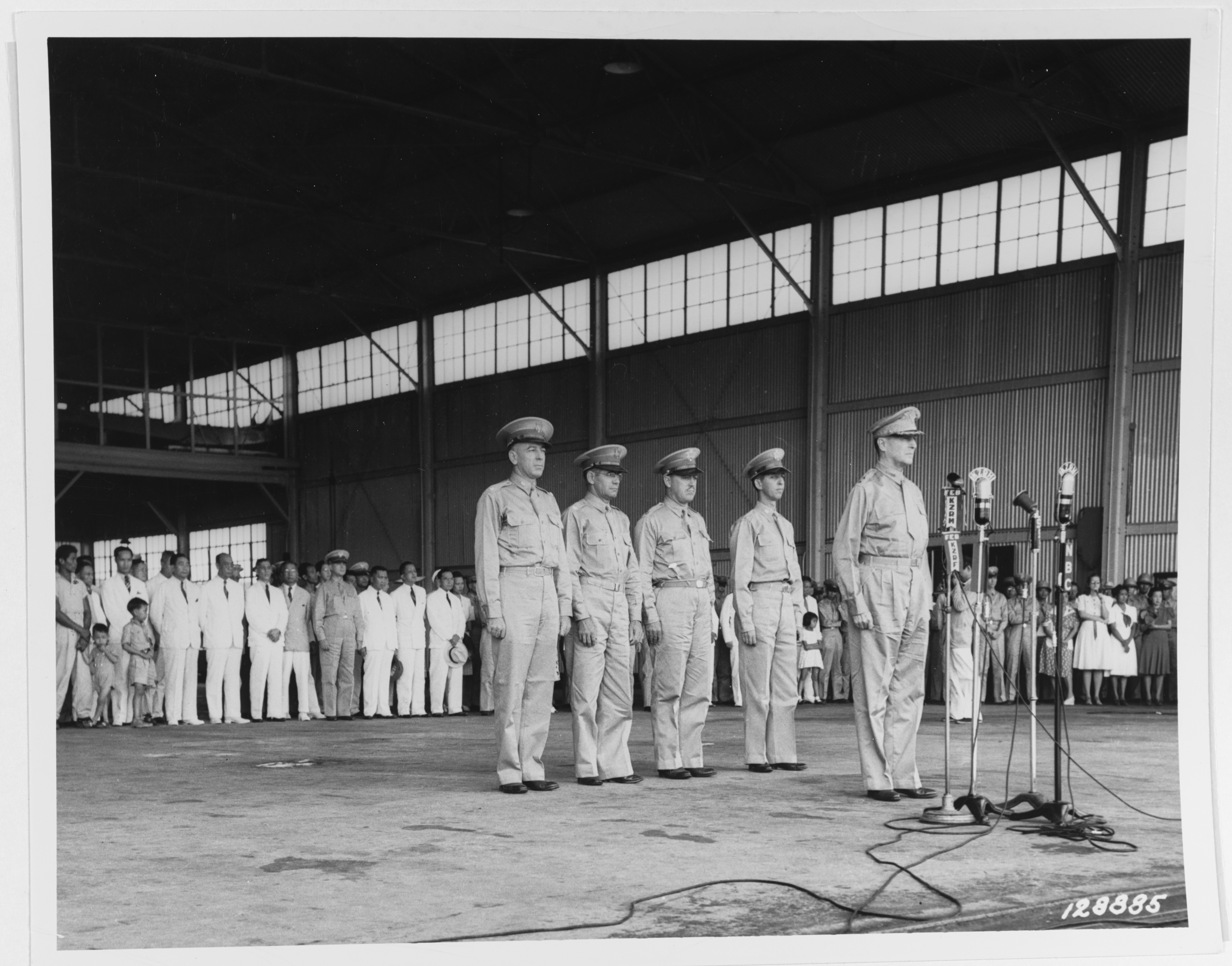
Ceremony at Camp Murphy, 15 August 1941, marking the induction of the Philippine Army Air Corps. Behind MacArthur, from left to right, are Lieutenant Colonel Richard K. Sutherland, Colonel Harold H. George, Lieutenant Colonel William F. Marquat and Major LeGrande A. Diller.

Quezon officially conferred the title of field marshal on MacArthur in a ceremony at Malacañan Palace on 24 August 1936. Eisenhower learned later that the field-marshalship had not been (as he had assumed) Quezon's idea: "rather, Quezon said that MacArthur himself came up with the high-sounding title." (A persistent myth has pervaded the biographical literature that MacArthur wore a specially designed sharkskin uniform at the 1936 ceremony. Richard Meixsel has debunked this story as a journalist's error.)

The Philippine Army was formed from conscription, and the Philippine Military Academy was created along the lines of West Point to train officers. MacArthur and Eisenhower found that few of the training camps had been constructed and the first group of 20,000 trainees did not report until early 1937. Equipment and weapons were American cast offs, and the budget was completely inadequate, although MacArthur and his naval adviser, Lieutenant Colonel Sidney L. Huff, persuaded the Navy to initiate the development of the PT boat. Much hope was placed in the Philippine Army Air Corps, but the first squadron was not organized until 1939. The 1922 Washington Naval Treaty banned the construction of new fortifications or naval bases in all Pacific territories of the five signatories from 1923 to 1936, and military bases were not allowed to be expanded or modernized. This added to the challenges facing MacArthur and Quezon.

In Manila, MacArthur was a member of the Freemasons. On 28 March 1936, he became a 32nd degree Scottish Rite Freemason. He married Jean Faircloth in a civil ceremony on 30 April 1937. Their son, Arthur MacArthur IV, was born in Manila on 21 February 1938. On 31 December 1937, MacArthur officially retired from the Army. He ceased to represent the U.S. as military adviser, but remained as Quezon's adviser in a civilian capacity. Eisenhower returned to the U.S., and was replaced as MacArthur's chief of staff by Lieutenant Colonel Richard K. Sutherland, while Richard J. Marshall became deputy chief of staff.

== World War II ==
=== Philippines campaign (1941–1942) ===
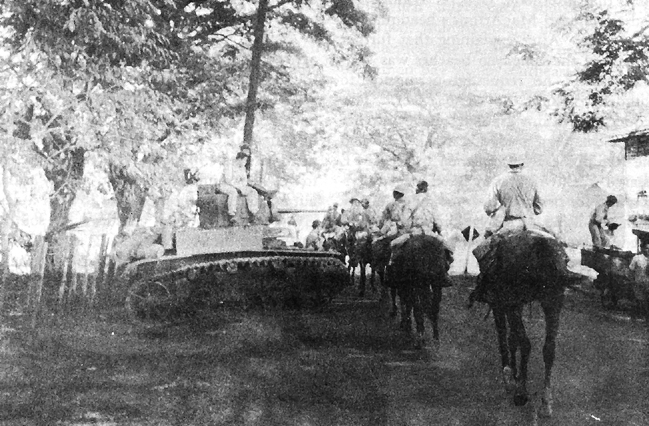
26th Cavalry (Philippine Scouts) move into Pozorrubio past an M3 Stuart tank.

==== Defense of the Philippines ====
On 26 July 1941, Roosevelt recalled MacArthur to active duty as a major general and named him commander of U.S. Army Forces in the Far East (USAFFE). MacArthur was promoted to lieutenant general the following day, and then to general on 20 December. The initial American plan for the defense of the Philippines called for the main body of the troops to retreat to the Bataan peninsula to hold out against the Japanese until a relief force could arrive. MacArthur changed this plan to one of attempting to hold all of Luzon and using B-17 Flying Fortresses to sink Japanese ships that approached the islands. MacArthur persuaded the decision-makers in Washington that his plans represented both the best deterrent to war and the best chance of victory.

The Navy intercept station in the islands, known as Station CAST, had an ultra-secret Purple cipher machine, which decrypted Japanese diplomatic messages, and partial codebooks for the latest JN-25 naval code. Station CAST sent MacArthur its entire output, via Sutherland, the only officer on his staff authorized to see it. At 03:30 local time on 8 December 1941, Sutherland learned of the attack on Pearl Harbor and informed MacArthur. At 05:30, the Chief of Staff of the U.S. Army, General George Marshall, ordered MacArthur to execute the existing war plan, Rainbow Five. This plan had been leaked to the American public by the Chicago Tribune three days prior, and the following day Germany had publicly ridiculed the plan. MacArthur did not follow Marshall's order. On three occasions, the commander of the Far East Air Force, Major General Lewis H. Brereton, requested permission to attack Japanese bases in Formosa, in accordance with prewar intentions, but was denied by Sutherland. Brereton instead ordered his aircraft to fly defensive patrol patterns, looking for Japanese warships. Not until 11:00 did Brereton speak with MacArthur, and obtained permission to begin Rainbow Five. MacArthur later denied having the conversation. At 12:30, aircraft of Japan's 11th Air Fleet achieved complete tactical surprise when they attacked Clark Field and the nearby fighter base at Iba Field. What was left of the Far East Air Force was all but destroyed over the next few days.

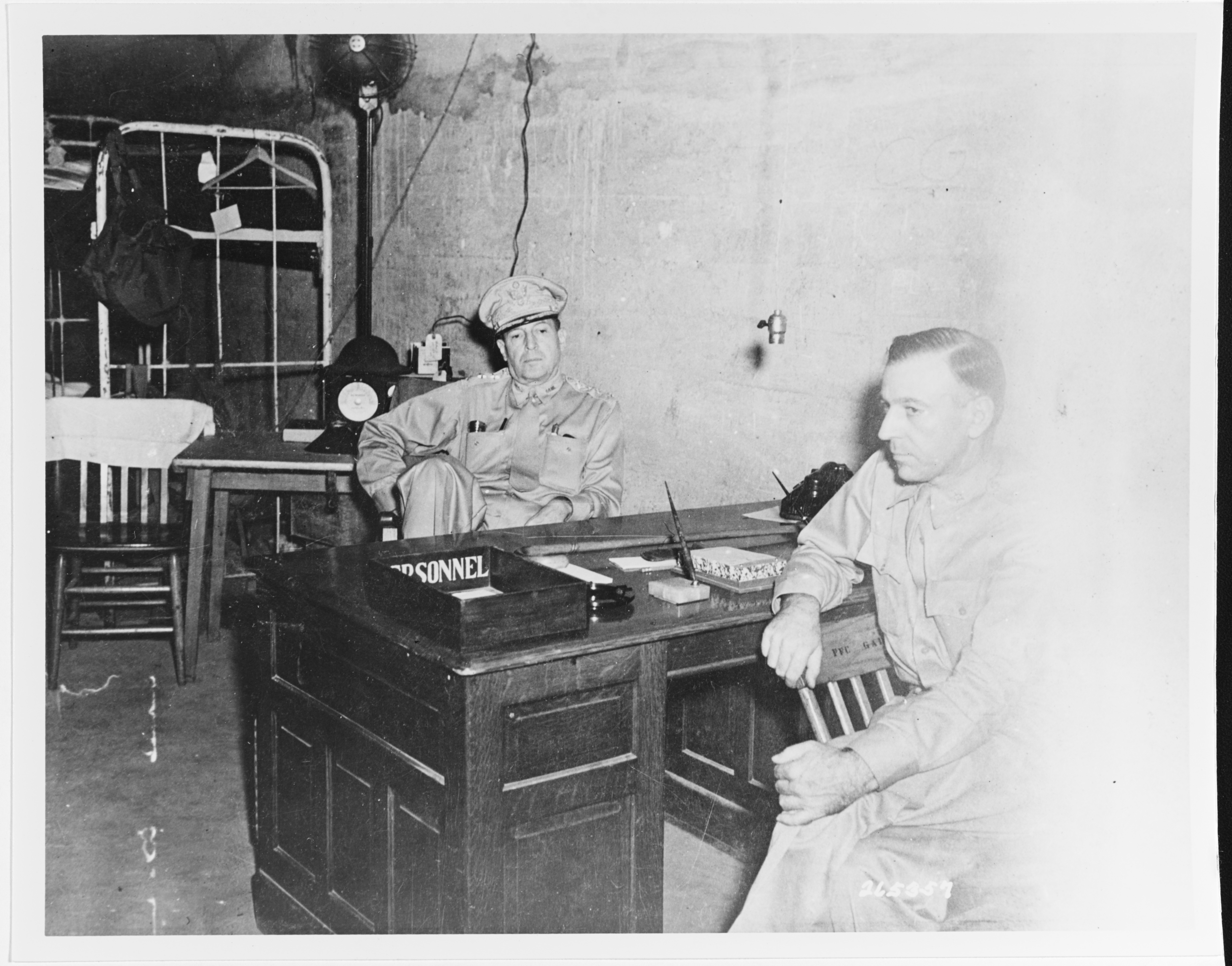
MacArthur (center) with his Chief of Staff, Major General Richard K. Sutherland, in the Headquarters tunnel on Corregidor, Philippines, on 1 March 1942

MacArthur attempted to slow the Japanese advance, but his plan for holding all of Luzon against the Japanese collapsed, for it distributed the American-Filipino forces too thinly. He reconsidered his overconfidence in the ability of his Filipino troops after the Japanese force made a rapid advance following its landing at Lingayen Gulf on 21 December, and ordered a retreat to Bataan. Within two days of the Japanese landing, MacArthur had reverted to the pre-July 1941 plan of attempting to hold only Bataan while waiting for a relief force. However, while most of the American and some of the Filipino troops were able to retreat back to Bataan, most of their supplies were abandoned in the confusion. Manila was declared an open city at midnight on 24 December.

On the evening of 24 December, MacArthur moved his headquarters to the island fortress of Corregidor. Air raids by the Japanese destroyed all the exposed structures on the island and USAFFE headquarters was moved into the Malinta Tunnel. In the first-ever air raid on Corregidor on 29 December, Japanese airplanes bombed all the buildings on Topside including MacArthur's house. MacArthur's family ran into the air raid shelter while MacArthur went outside to the garden with some soldiers to count the bombers involved in the raid when bombs destroyed the home. One bomb struck only 10 feet (3.0 m) from MacArthur and the soldiers shielded him with their bodies and helmets. Filipino sergeant Domingo Adversario was awarded the Silver Star and Purple Heart for getting his hand wounded by the bomb and covering MacArthur's head with his own helmet, which was also hit by shrapnel. MacArthur was not wounded. Later, most of the headquarters moved to Bataan, leaving only the nucleus with MacArthur. The troops on Bataan knew that they had been written off but continued to fight. Some blamed Roosevelt and MacArthur for their predicament. A ballad sung to the tune of "The Battle Hymn of the Republic" called him "Dugout Doug". However, most clung to the belief that somehow MacArthur "would reach down and pull something out of his hat".

On 1 January 1942, MacArthur accepted $500,000 (equivalent to $7.78 million in 2025) from President Quezon as payment for his pre-war service. MacArthur's staff members also received payments. Eisenhower—after being appointed Supreme Commander Allied Expeditionary Force (AEF)—was offered money by Quezon, but declined. These payments were known only to a few in Manila and Washington, including President Roosevelt and Secretary of War Henry L. Stimson, until they were made public by historian Carol Petillo in 1979. While the payments had been legal, the revelation tarnished MacArthur's reputation.

==== Escape from the Philippines ====
In February 1942, as Japanese forces tightened their grip on the Philippines, Roosevelt ordered MacArthur to relocate to Australia. On the night of 12 March 1942, MacArthur, his wife Jean, son Arthur, Arthur's Cantonese amah, Loh Chui, and other members of his staff left Corregidor. They traveled in PT boats through stormy seas patrolled by Japanese warships, and reached Del Monte Airfield on Mindanao, from where B-17s flew them to Australia. MacArthur arrived in Melbourne by train on 21 March. His declaration, "I came through and I shall return", was first made at Terowie railway station on 20 March. Washington asked MacArthur to amend his promise to "We shall return". He ignored the request.

Bataan surrendered on 9 April, and Corregidor on 6 May.

==== Medal of Honor ====
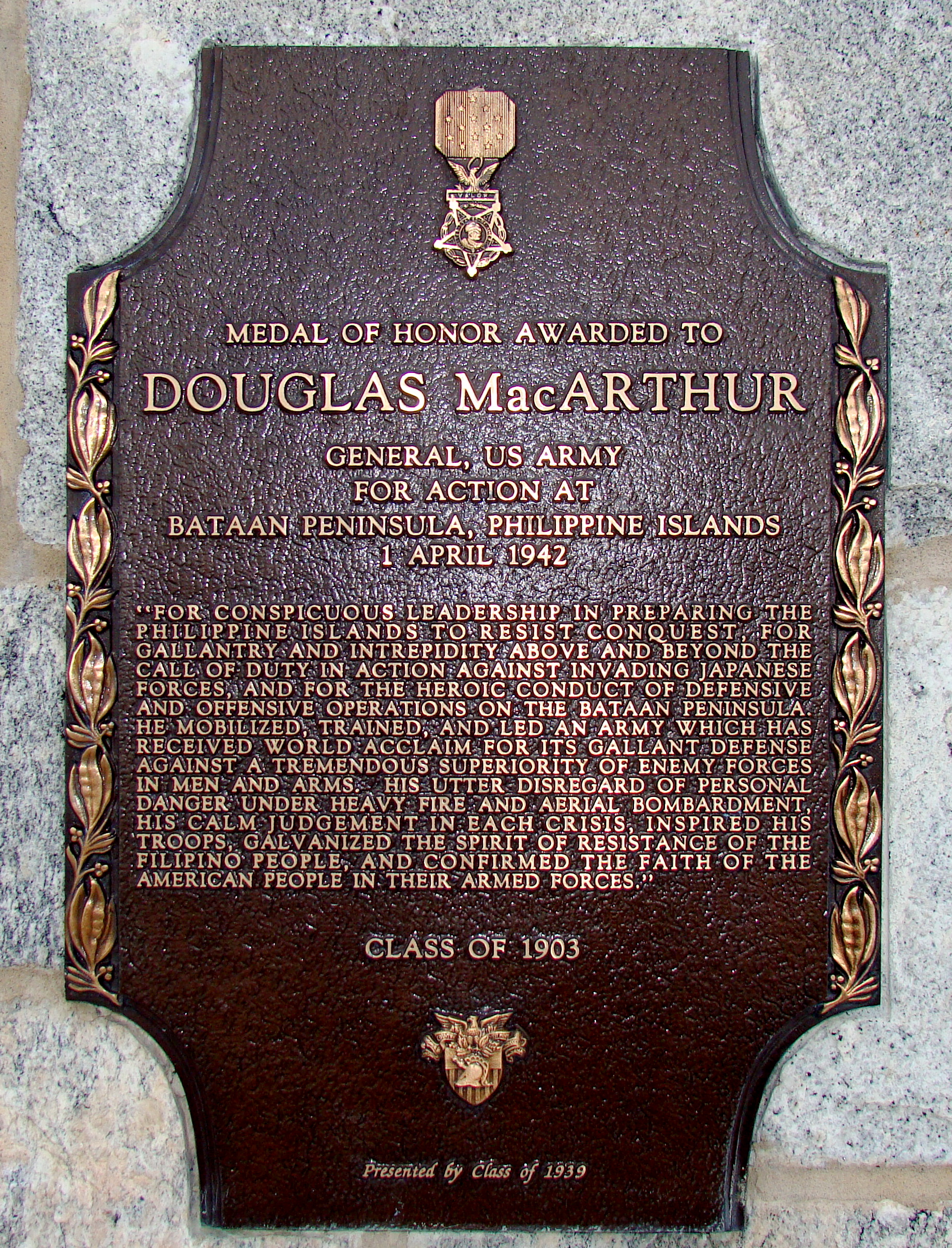
A plaque inscribed with MacArthur's Medal of Honor citation lies affixed to MacArthur barracks at the U.S. Military Academy.

George Marshall decided that MacArthur would be awarded the Medal of Honor, a decoration for which he had twice previously been nominated, "to offset any propaganda by the enemy directed at his leaving his command". Eisenhower pointed out that MacArthur had not actually performed any acts of valor as required by law, but Marshall cited the 1927 award of the medal to Charles Lindbergh as a precedent. Special legislation had been passed to authorize Lindbergh's medal, but while similar legislation was introduced authorizing the medal for MacArthur, Marshall felt that the recognition "would mean more" if the gallantry criteria were not waived.

Marshall ordered Sutherland to recommend the award and authored the citation himself. This also meant that it violated the governing statute, as it could only be considered lawful so long as material requirements were waived by Congress, such as the unmet requirement to perform conspicuous gallantry "above and beyond the call of duty". Marshall admitted the defect to the secretary of war. When the Army's adjutant general reviewed the case in 1945, he determined that "authority for [MacArthur's] award is questionable under strict interpretation of regulations".

MacArthur expressed the sentiment that "this award was intended not so much for me personally as it is a recognition of the indomitable courage of the gallant army which it was my honor to command". At the age of 62, MacArthur was the oldest living active-duty Medal of Honor recipient and the highest-ranked military servicemember to ever receive it. Arthur and Douglas MacArthur thus became the first father and son to be awarded the Medal of Honor. As the symbol of the forces resisting the Japanese, MacArthur received many other accolades. The Native American tribes of the Southwest chose him as a "Chief of Chiefs", which he acknowledged as from "my oldest friends, the companions of my boyhood days on the Western frontier".

=== New Guinea Campaign ===
==== General Headquarters ====
On 18 April 1942, MacArthur was appointed Supreme Commander of Allied Forces in the Southwest Pacific Area (SWPA). Lieutenant General George Brett became Commander, Allied Air Forces, and Vice Admiral Herbert F. Leary became Commander, Allied Naval Forces. Since the bulk of land forces in the theater were Australian, George Marshall insisted an Australian be appointed as Commander, Allied Land Forces; the job went to General Sir Thomas Blamey. Although predominantly Australian and American, MacArthur's command also included personnel from the Netherlands East Indies, the UK, and other countries.

MacArthur established a close relationship with the prime minister of Australia, John Curtin, and was probably the second most-powerful person in the country after the prime minister, although many Australians resented MacArthur as a foreign general who had been imposed upon them. MacArthur had little confidence in Brett's abilities as commander of Allied Air Forces, and in August 1942 selected Major General George C. Kenney to replace him. Kenney's application of air power in support of Blamey's troops would prove crucial.

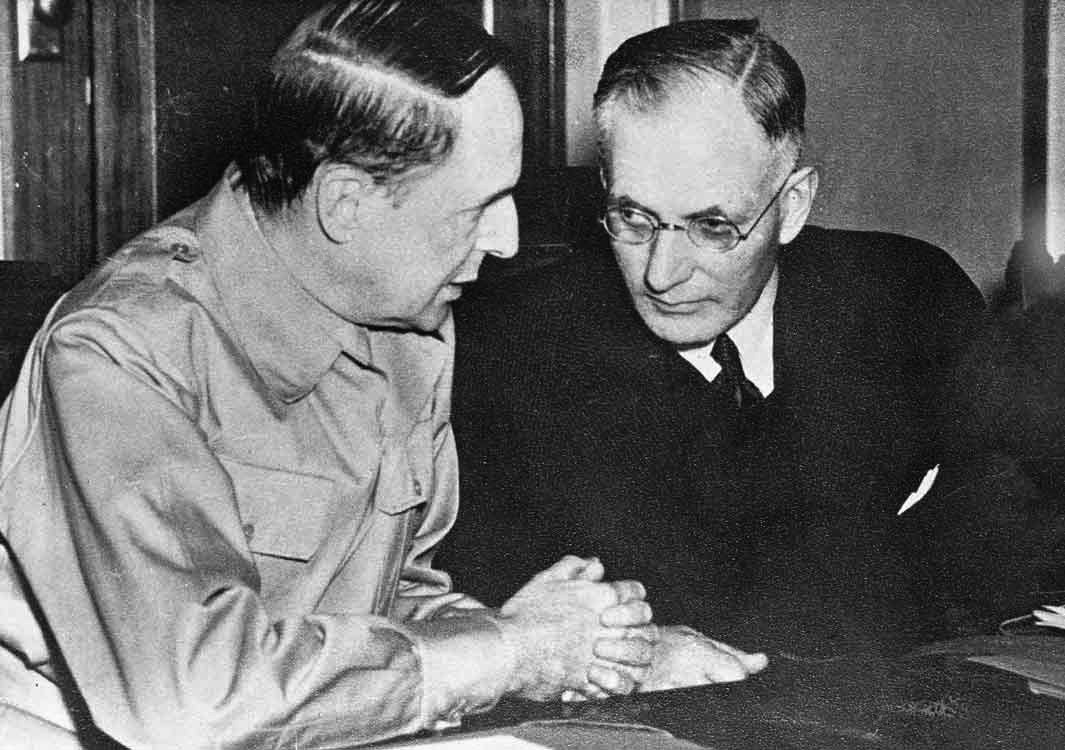
Australian prime minister John Curtin (right) confers with MacArthur.

The staff of MacArthur's General Headquarters (GHQ) was built around the nucleus that had escaped from the Philippines with him, who became known as the "Bataan Gang". Though Roosevelt and George Marshall pressed for Dutch and Australian officers to be assigned to GHQ, the heads of all the staff divisions were American and such officers of other nationalities as were assigned served under them. Initially located in Melbourne, GHQ moved to Brisbane in July 1942, occupying the Australian Mutual Provident Society building (renamed MacArthur Chambers after the war).

MacArthur formed his own signals intelligence organization, known as the Central Bureau, from Australian intelligence units and American cryptanalysts who had escaped from the Philippines. This unit forwarded Ultra information to MacArthur's Chief of Intelligence, Charles A. Willoughby. After a press release revealed details of the Japanese naval dispositions during the Battle of the Coral Sea, Roosevelt ordered that censorship be imposed in Australia, and the Advisory War Council granted GHQ censorship authority over the Australian press. Australian newspapers were restricted to what was reported in the daily GHQ communiqué. Veteran correspondents considered the communiqués, which MacArthur drafted personally, "a total farce".

==== Papuan Campaign ====
Anticipating that the Japanese would strike at Port Moresby again, the garrison was strengthened and MacArthur ordered the establishment of bases at Merauke and Milne Bay to cover its flanks. The Battle of Midway in June 1942 led to consideration of a limited offensive in the Pacific. MacArthur's proposal for an attack on the Japanese base at Rabaul met with objections from the Navy, which favored a less ambitious approach, and objected to an Army general being in command of an amphibious operation. The resulting compromise called for a three-stage advance. The first stage, the seizure of the Tulagi area, would be conducted by the Pacific Ocean Areas, under Admiral Chester W. Nimitz. The later stages would be under MacArthur's command.

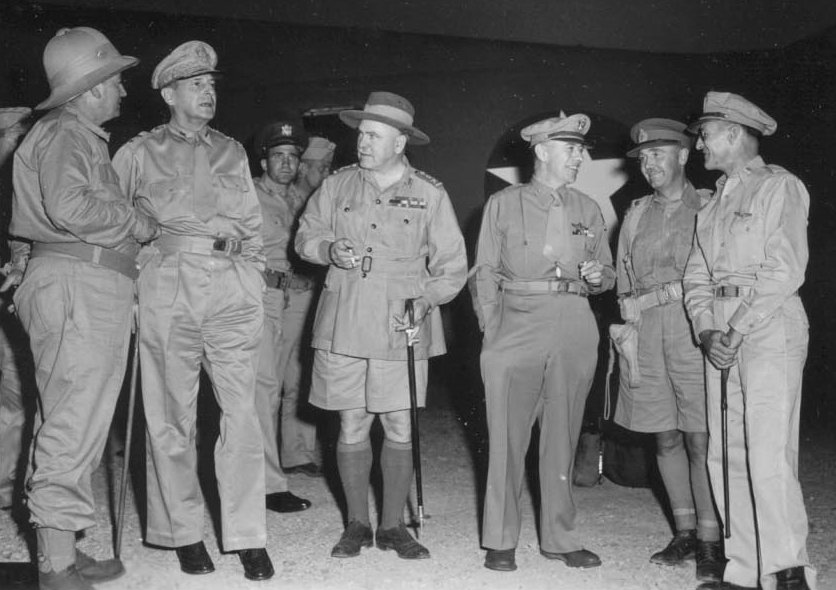
Senior Allied commanders in New Guinea in October 1942. Left to right: Mr Frank Forde (Australian Minister for the Army); MacArthur; General Sir Thomas Blamey, Allied Land Forces; Lieutenant General George C. Kenney, Allied Air Forces; Lieutenant General Edmund Herring, New Guinea Force; Brigadier General Kenneth Walker, V Bomber Command.

The Japanese struck first, landing at Buna in July, and at Milne Bay in August. On 30 August, MacArthur radioed Washington that unless action was taken, New Guinea Force would be overwhelmed. He sent Blamey to Port Moresby to take personal command. Having committed all available Australian troops, MacArthur decided to send American forces. The 32nd Infantry Division, a poorly trained National Guard division, was selected. A series of embarrassing reverses in the Battle of Buna–Gona led to outspoken criticism of the American troops by the Australians. MacArthur then ordered Lieutenant General Robert L. Eichelberger to assume command of the Americans, and "take Buna, or not come back alive".

MacArthur moved the advanced echelon of GHQ to Port Moresby on 6 November 1942. After Buna finally fell on 3 January 1943, MacArthur awarded the Distinguished Service Cross to twelve officers for "precise execution of operations". This use of the country's second highest award aroused resentment, because while some had fought in the field, others had not. MacArthur was awarded his third Distinguished Service Medal, and the Australian government had him appointed an honorary Knight Grand Cross of the British Order of the Bath.

==== New Guinea Campaign ====
At the Pacific Military Conference in March 1943, the Joint Chiefs of Staff approved MacArthur's plan for Operation Cartwheel, the advance on Rabaul. MacArthur explained his strategy:

My strategic conception for the Pacific Theater... contemplates massive strokes against only main strategic objectives, utilizing surprise and air-ground striking power supported and assisted by the fleet. This is the very opposite of what is termed "island hopping" which is the gradual pushing back of the enemy by direct frontal pressure with the consequent heavy casualties which will certainly be involved... New conditions require for solution and new weapons require for maximum application new and imaginative methods. Wars are never won in the past.

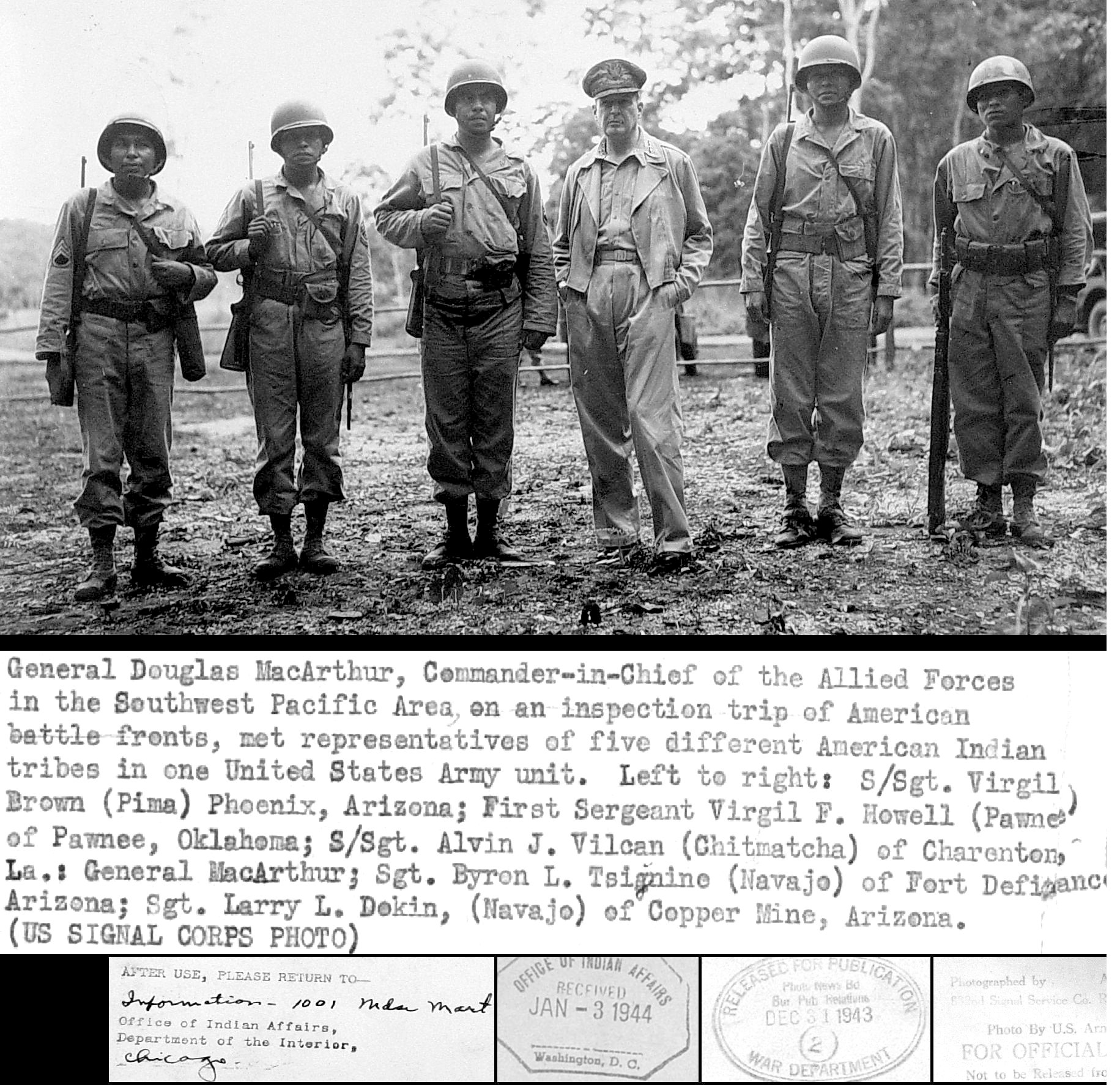
MacArthur with Native American codetalkers in the Southwest Pacific

Lieutenant General Walter Krueger's Sixth Army headquarters arrived in SWPA in early 1943 but MacArthur had only three American divisions, and they were depleted from the fighting at the Battles of Buna–Gona and Guadalcanal. As a result, "it became obvious that any military offensive in the South-West Pacific in 1943 would have to be carried out mainly by the Australian Army". The offensive began with the landing at Lae by the Australian 9th Division on 4 September 1943. The next day, MacArthur watched the landing at Nadzab by the 503rd Parachute Infantry. His B-17 made the trip on three engines because one failed soon after leaving Port Moresby, but he insisted that it fly on. For this, he was awarded the Air Medal.

The Australian 7th and 9th Divisions converged on Lae, which fell on 16 September. MacArthur advanced his timetable, and ordered the 7th to capture Kaiapit and Dumpu, while the 9th mounted an amphibious assault on Finschhafen. Here, the offensive bogged down, partly because MacArthur had based his decision to assault Finschhafen on Willoughby's assessment that there were only 350 Japanese defenders there, when in fact there were nearly 5,000. A furious battle ensued.

In early November, MacArthur's plan for a westward advance along the coast of New Guinea to the Philippines was incorporated into plans for the war against Japan. Three months later, airmen reported no signs of enemy activity in the Admiralty Islands. Although Willoughby did not agree that the islands had been evacuated, MacArthur ordered an amphibious landing, commencing the Admiralty Islands campaign. He accompanied the assault force aboard the light cruiser Phoenix and came ashore seven hours after the first wave of landing craft, for which he was awarded the Bronze Star. It took six weeks of fierce fighting before the 1st Cavalry Division captured the islands.

MacArthur had one of the most powerful PR machines of any Allied general during the war, which made him into a popular war hero with the American people. In late 1943–early 1944, a conservative faction in the Republican Party sought to have MacArthur seek the Republican nomination for the presidency in the 1944 election, as they regarded the two most likely Republican candidates, Wendell Willkie and Thomas E. Dewey, as too liberal. MacArthur considered running, but he decided not to until after he had liberated the Philippines.

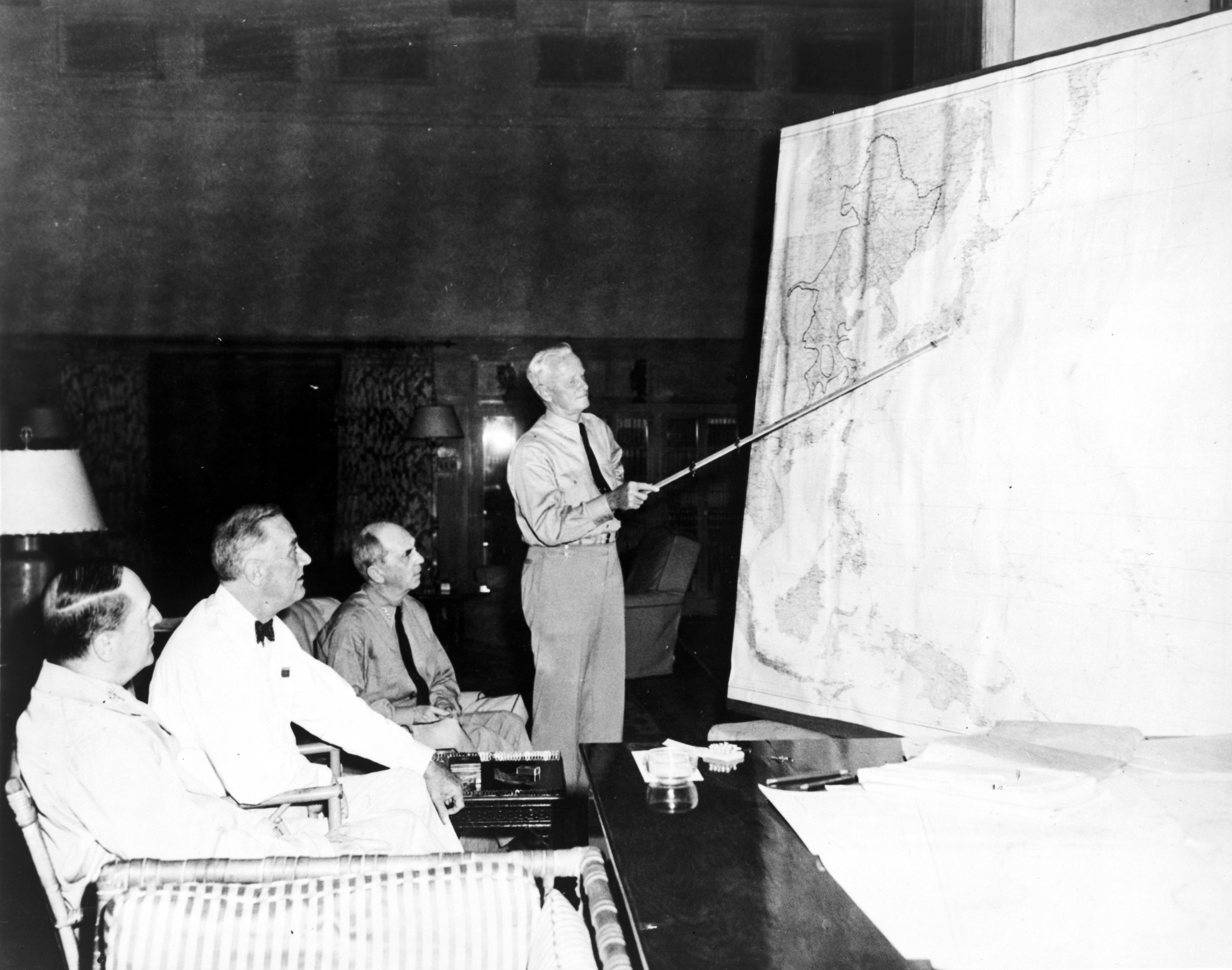
Conference in Hawaii, July 1944. Left to right: General MacArthur, President Roosevelt, Admiral Leahy, Admiral Nimitz.

MacArthur bypassed the Japanese forces at Hansa Bay and Wewak, and assaulted Hollandia and Aitape, which Willoughby reported being lightly defended based on intelligence gathered in the Battle of Sio. MacArthur's bold thrust 600 miles up the coast had surprised the Japanese high command. Although they were out of range of the Fifth Air Force's fighters based in the Ramu Valley, the timing of the operation allowed the aircraft carriers of Nimitz's Pacific Fleet to provide air support.

Though risky, the operation was another success. MacArthur caught the Japanese off balance and cut off Lieutenant General Hatazō Adachi's Japanese XVIII Army in the Wewak area. Because the Japanese were not expecting an attack, the garrison was weak, and Allied casualties were correspondingly light. However, the terrain turned out to be less suitable for airbase development than first thought, forcing MacArthur to seek better locations further west. While bypassing Japanese forces had great tactical merit, it had the strategic drawback of tying up Allied troops to contain them.

=== Philippines Campaign (1944–1945) ===
==== Leyte ====
In July 1944, President Roosevelt summoned MacArthur to meet with him in Hawaii "to determine the phase of action against Japan". Nimitz made the case for attacking Formosa. MacArthur stressed America's moral obligation to liberate the Philippines and won Roosevelt's support. In September, Admiral William Halsey Jr.'s carriers made a series of air strikes on the Philippines. Opposition was feeble; Halsey concluded, incorrectly, that Leyte was possibly undefended, and recommended that projected operations be skipped in favor of an assault on Leyte.

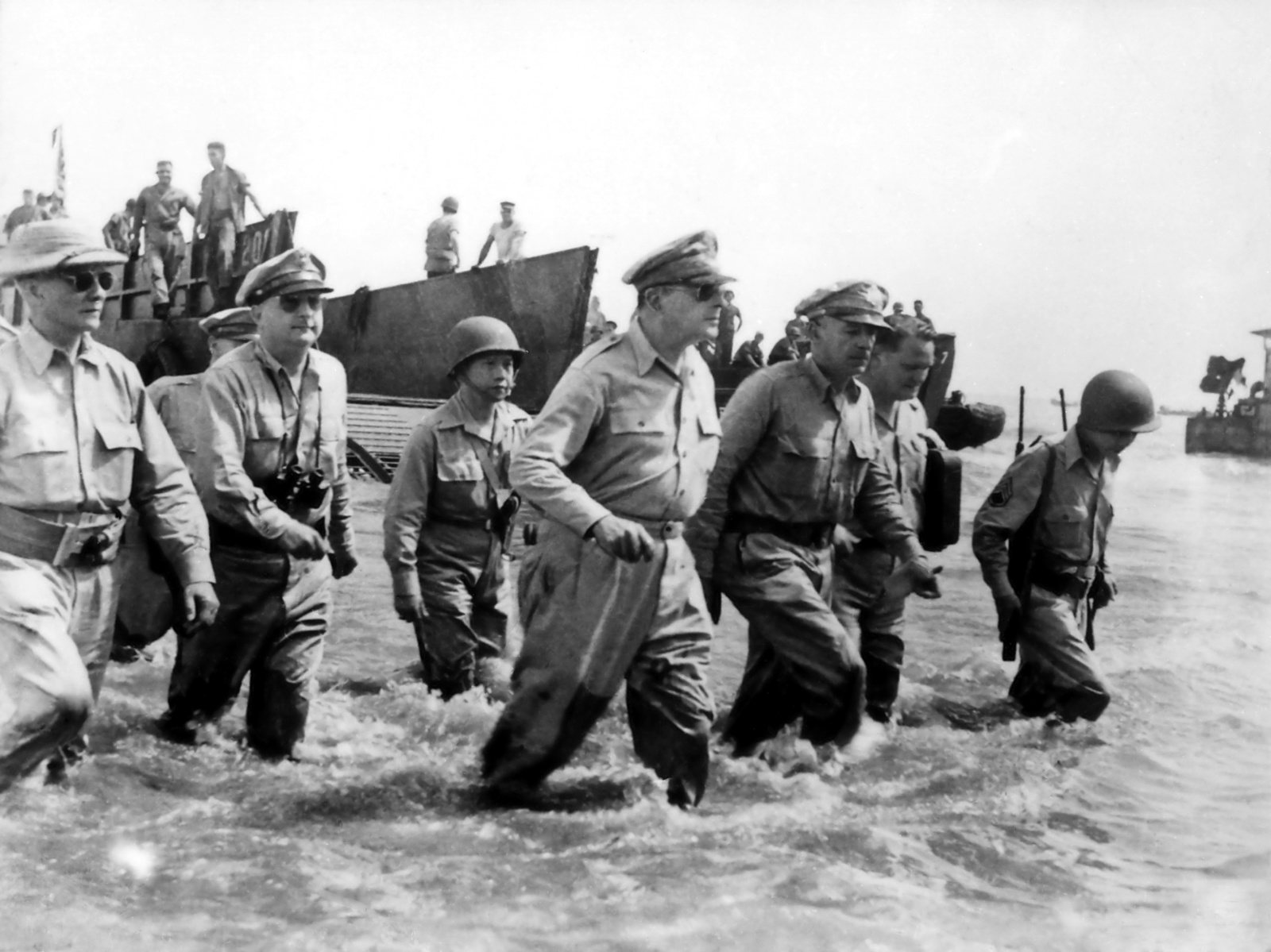
"I have returned" – General MacArthur returns to the Philippines with Philippine President Sergio Osmeña. This iconic image is re-created in larger-than-life statues at MacArthur Landing Memorial National Park.

On 20 October 1944, troops of Krueger's Sixth Army landed on Leyte, while MacArthur watched from the light cruiser USS Nashville. That afternoon he arrived on the beach. The advance had not progressed far; snipers were still active and the area was under sporadic mortar fire. When his boat grounded in knee-deep water, MacArthur requested a landing craft, but the beachmaster was too busy to grant his request, and he was compelled to wade ashore. In his prepared speech, he said:

People of the Philippines: I have returned. By the grace of Almighty God our forces stand again on Philippine soil—soil consecrated in the blood of our two peoples. We have come dedicated and committed to the task of destroying every vestige of enemy control over your daily lives, and of restoring upon a foundation of indestructible strength, the liberties of your people.

Japanese air activity soon increased, including raids on Tacloban, where MacArthur established his headquarters. Over the next few days, the Japanese counterattacked in the Battle of Leyte Gulf, resulting in a near-disaster that MacArthur attributed to the command being divided between himself and Nimitz. Heavy rains disrupted the airbase construction program, carrier aircraft proved to be no substitute for land-based aircraft, and the lack of air cover permitted the Japanese to pour troops into Leyte. By the end of December, Krueger's headquarters estimated that 5,000 Japanese remained on Leyte, and on 26 December MacArthur issued a communiqué announcing that "the campaign can now be regarded as closed except for minor mopping up". Yet Eichelberger's Eighth Army killed another 27,000 Japanese on Leyte before the campaign ended in May 1945.

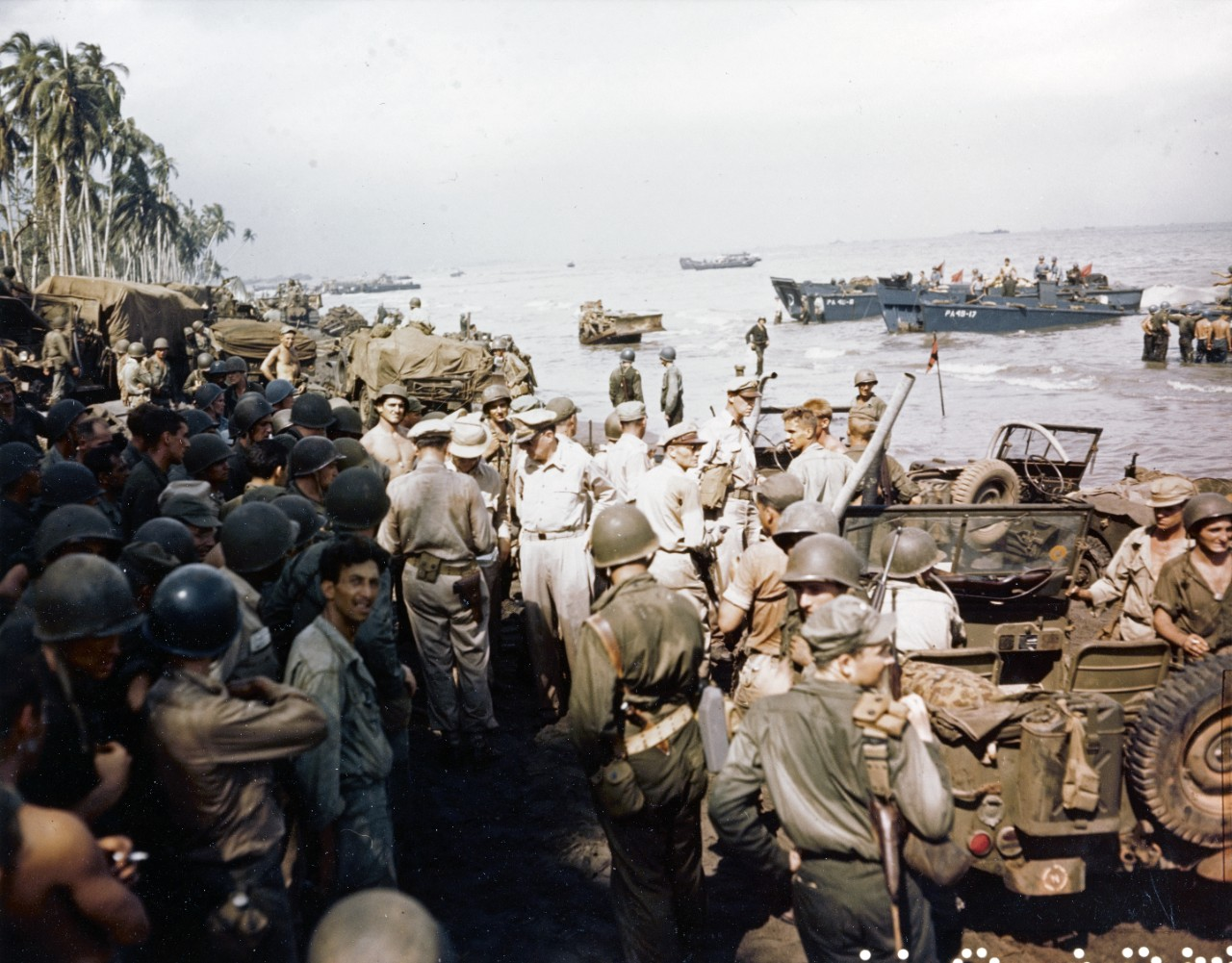
MacArthur (center) inspecting the beachhead on Leyte on 20 October 1944

On 18 December 1944, MacArthur was promoted to the new five-star rank of General of the Army, one of only four men to achieve the rank in World War II. MacArthur was senior to all but Marshall. The rank was created by an Act of Congress, as a temporary rank. The temporary rank was declared permanent 23 March 1946 by Congress.

==== Luzon ====
MacArthur's next move was the invasion of Mindoro, where there were good potential airfield sites. Willoughby estimated, correctly, that the island had only about 1,000 Japanese defenders. Vice Admiral Thomas C. Kinkaid balked at sending escort carriers into the restricted waters of the Sulu Sea, and Kenney could not guarantee land-based air cover. The operation was clearly hazardous, and MacArthur's staff talked him out of accompanying the invasion on Nashville. As the invasion force entered the Sulu Sea, a kamikaze struck Nashville, killing 133 people and wounding 190 more. Australian and American engineers had three airstrips in operation within two weeks, but the resupply convoys were repeatedly attacked by kamikazes. During this time, MacArthur quarreled with Sutherland, notorious for his abrasiveness, over the latter's mistress, Captain Elaine Clark. MacArthur had instructed Sutherland not to bring Clark to Leyte, due to a personal undertaking to Curtin that Australian women on the GHQ staff would not be taken to the Philippines, but Sutherland had brought her anyway.

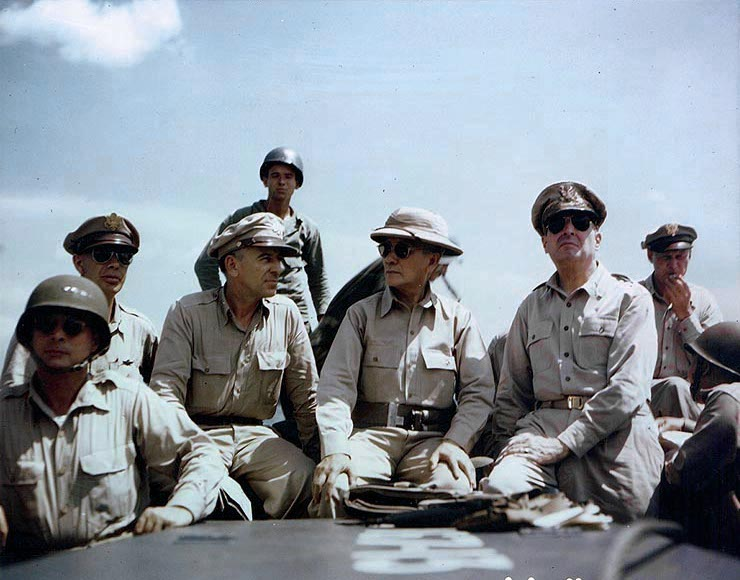
American military officers off Leyte Island in the Philippines, October 1944: Lieutenant General George Kenney, Lieutenant General Richard K. Sutherland, President Sergio Osmeña, General Douglas MacArthur

The way was now clear for the invasion of Luzon. This time, based on different interpretations of the same intelligence data, Willoughby estimated the strength of General Tomoyuki Yamashita's forces on Luzon at 137,000, while Sixth Army estimated it at 234,000. MacArthur felt even Willoughby's estimate was too high. "Audacity, calculated risk, and a clear strategic aim were MacArthur's attributes", and he disregarded the estimates. In fact, they were too low; Yamashita had more than 287,000 troops. MacArthur traveled aboard the light cruiser USS Boise, watching as the ship was nearly hit by a bomb and torpedoes fired by midget submarines. His communiqué read: "The decisive battle for the liberation of the Philippines and the control of the Southwest Pacific is at hand. General MacArthur is in personal command at the front and landed with his assault troops."

MacArthur's primary concern was the capture of the port of Manila and the airbase at Clark Field, which were required to support future operations. He ordered the 1st Cavalry Division to conduct a rapid advance on Manila. It reached the northern outskirts on 3 February, but, unknown to the Americans, Rear Admiral Sanji Iwabuchi had decided to defend Manila to the death. The Battle of Manila raged for the next three weeks. To spare the civilian population, MacArthur prohibited air strikes, but thousands of civilians died in the crossfire or Japanese massacres. He also refused to restrict the traffic of civilians who clogged the roads in and out of Manila, placing humanitarian concerns above military ones except in emergencies. For his part in the capture of Manila, MacArthur was awarded his third Distinguished Service Cross.

After taking Manila, MacArthur installed one of his Filipino friends, Manuel Roxas, into a position of power that ensured Roxas would become the next Filipino president. Roxas had been a leading Japanese collaborator in the puppet government of José Laurel, but MacArthur claimed that Roxas had secretly been an American agent. Weinberg wrote that "evidence to this effect has yet to surface", and that by favoring the Japanese collaborator Roxas, MacArthur ensured there was no serious effort to address the issue of Filipino collaboration with the Japanese after the war. There was evidence that Roxas used his position in the Japanese puppet government to secretly gather intelligence to pass onto guerillas, MacArthur, and his intelligence staff during the occupation.

One of the major reasons for MacArthur to return to the Philippines was to liberate internee camps and to relieve the Filipino civilians suffering at the hands of the brutal Japanese occupiers. MacArthur authorized daring rescues at prison camps like Cabanatuan, Los Baños, and Santo Tomas.

After the Battle of Manila, MacArthur turned his attention to Yamashita, who had retreated into the mountains of Luzon. Yamashita chose to fight a defensive campaign, being pushed back slowly by Krueger, and was still holding out when the war ended, much to MacArthur's intense annoyance as he had wished to liberate the entire Philippines before the war ended. On 2 September 1945, Yamashita came down from the mountains to surrender with some 50,500 men.

==== Southern Philippines ====
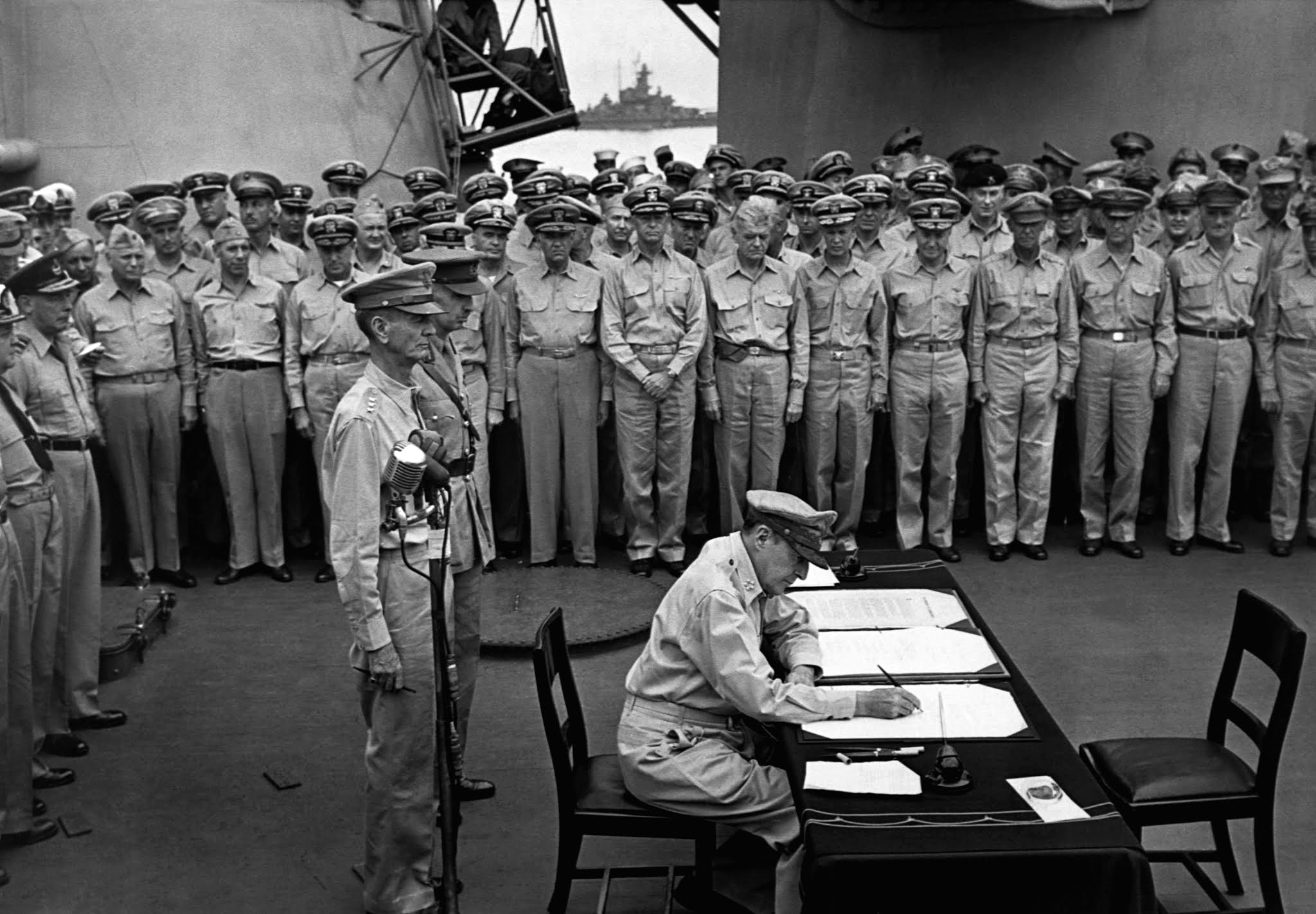
MacArthur signs the Japanese Instrument of Surrender aboard the USS Missouri. American General Jonathan Wainwright and British General Arthur Percival stand behind him.

Although MacArthur had no specific directive to do so, and the fighting on Luzon was far from over, he committed his forces to liberate the remainder of the Philippines. In the GHQ communiqué on 5 July, he announced that the Philippines had been liberated, although Yamashita still held out in northern Luzon. Starting in May 1945, MacArthur used his Australian troops in the invasion of Borneo. He accompanied the assault on Labuan and visited the troops ashore. While returning to GHQ in Manila, he visited Davao, where he told Eichelberger that no more than 4,000 Japanese remained alive on Mindanao. A few months later, six times that number surrendered. In July 1945, he was awarded his fourth Distinguished Service Medal.

As part of preparations for Operation Downfall, the invasion of Japan, MacArthur became commander in chief U.S. Army Forces Pacific (AFPAC) in April 1945, assuming command of all Army and Army Air Force units in the Pacific except the Twentieth Air Force. Nimitz became commander of all naval forces. Command in the Pacific therefore remained divided. During his planning of the invasion of Japan, MacArthur stressed to the decision-makers in Washington that it was essential to have the Soviet Red Army tie down the Kwantung army in Manchuria. He later said that he would not have supported the Soviet invasion of Manchuria had he known about the secret deal that involved parts of Manchuria and northern Korea being given to the Soviet Union. Unlike Nimitz, MacArthur was not told about the existence of the atomic bomb until a few days before its use on Hiroshima. The invasion was pre-empted by the surrender of Japan in August 1945. On 2 September MacArthur accepted the formal Japanese surrender aboard the battleship USS Missouri, thus ending hostilities in World War II. In recognition of his role as a maritime strategist, the U.S. Navy awarded him the Navy Distinguished Service Medal.

== Occupation of Japan ==
=== Protecting the Emperor ===
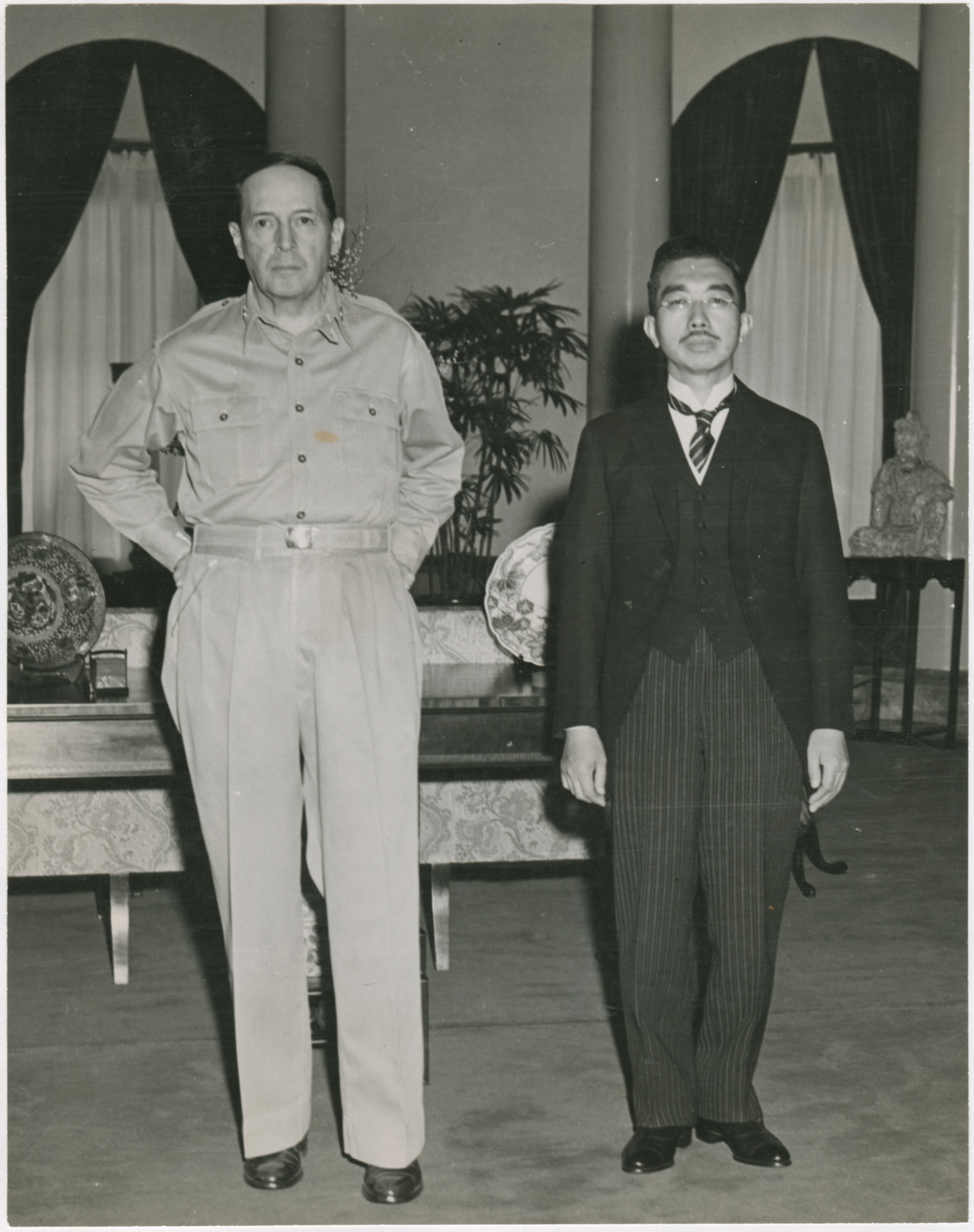
MacArthur and the Emperor of Japan, Hirohito, at their first meeting, September 1945

On 29 August 1945, MacArthur was ordered to exercise authority through the Japanese government machinery, including Emperor Hirohito. MacArthur's headquarters was located in the Dai Ichi Life Insurance Building in Tokyo. Unlike in Germany, where the Allies had abolished the German state, the Americans chose to allow the Japanese state to continue to exist, albeit under their ultimate control.

After the Japanese surrender in August 1945, pressure from both Allied countries and Japanese leftists demanded the emperor step down and be indicted as a war criminal. MacArthur disagreed, as he thought that an ostensibly cooperating emperor would help establish a peaceful Allied occupation regime. MacArthur ignored the advice of many members of the imperial family and Japanese intellectuals who publicly called for the abdication of the Emperor. His reasoning was if the emperor were executed or imprisoned there would be a violent backlash and revolution and this would interfere with his primary goal to change Japan to a pro-Western modern democracy. In a cable to Eisenhower in February 1946, MacArthur said executing or imprisoning the emperor would require one million occupation soldiers to keep the peace.

Technicolor film of MacArthur's arrival in allied-occupied Tokyo and flag-raising ceremony, September 1945.

At the same time, MacArthur undermined the imperial mystique when his staff released a picture of his first meeting with the Emperor, the impact of which on the Japanese public was electric as the Japanese people for the first time saw the Emperor as overshadowed by the much taller MacArthur. Up to 1945, the Emperor had been a remote, mysterious figure to his people, rarely seen in public and always silent, whose photographs were always taken from a certain angle to make him look taller and more impressive than he really was. The Japanese government banned the photograph on the grounds that it damaged the imperial mystique, but MacArthur rescinded the ban and ordered Japanese newspapers to print it.

=== War crimes trials ===
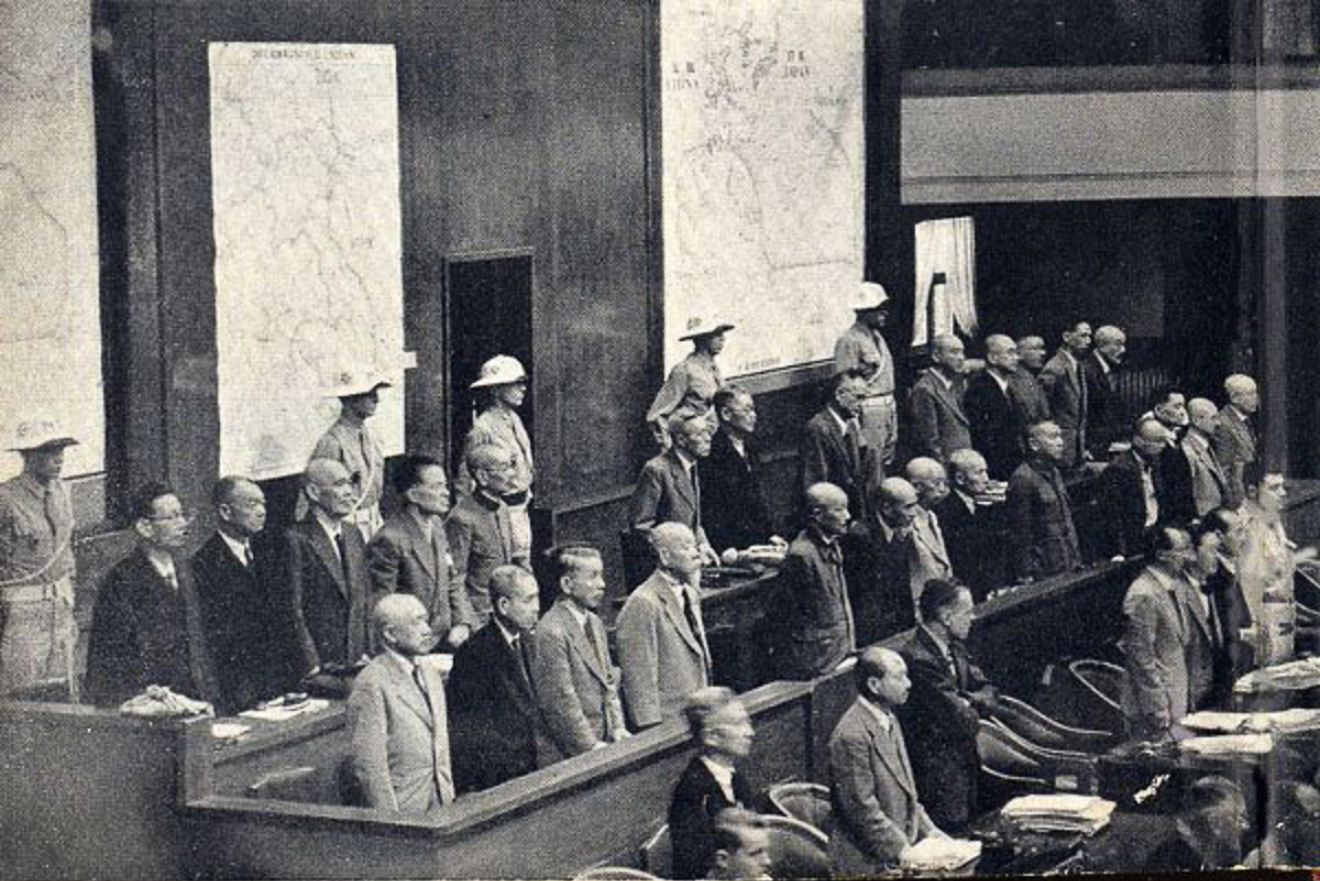
The defendants at the Tokyo War Crimes Trials

MacArthur was responsible for confirming and enforcing the sentences for war crimes handed down by the International Military Tribunal for the Far East. In late 1945, Allied military commissions in Asia tried 5,700 Japanese, Taiwanese and Koreans for war crimes that included the Rape of Nanking, the Bataan Death March and the Manila massacre. About 4,300 were convicted, almost 1,000 sentenced to death, and hundreds given life imprisonment.

MacArthur recommended that Shirō Ishii and other members of Unit 731 be granted immunity from prosecution in exchange for germ warfare data based on human experimentation. Since retaining the emperor was crucial to ensuring control over the population, the Allied forces shielded him from war responsibility. MacArthur also exempted all members of the imperial family.

=== Supreme Commander for the Allied Powers ===
As Supreme Commander for the Allied Powers (SCAP) in Japan, MacArthur and his staff helped Japan rebuild, eradicate militarism and ultra-nationalism, promote civil liberties, institute democratic government, and chart a course that ultimately made Japan one of the world's leading industrial powers. In 1946, his staff drafted a new constitution that renounced war and stripped the Emperor of military authority. The constitution—which became effective on 3 May 1947—instituted a parliamentary system, under which the Emperor acted only on the advice of his ministers. Article 9 outlawed belligerency as an instrument of state policy and the maintenance of a standing army. The constitution also enfranchised women, guaranteed human rights, outlawed racial discrimination, strengthened the powers of Parliament and the Cabinet, and decentralized the police and local government.

Between 1947 and 1949, approximately 4,700,000 acres (1,900,000 ha), or 38% of Japan's cultivated land, was purchased from the landlords under the government's land reform program, and 4,600,000 acres (1,860,000 ha) was resold to the farmers who worked them. By 1950, 89% of all agricultural land was owner-operated. MacArthur's efforts to encourage trade union membership met with phenomenal success: by 1947, 48% of the non-agricultural workforce was unionized. Some of MacArthur's reforms were rescinded in 1948 when his unilateral control of Japan was ended by the increased involvement of the State Department. During the Occupation, SCAP successfully, if not entirely, abolished many of the financial coalitions known as the Zaibatsu, which had previously monopolized industry. The reforms alarmed many in the U.S. Departments of Defense and State, who believed they conflicted with the prospect of Japan and its industrial capacity as a bulwark against the spread of communism.

In 1947, MacArthur invited the founder of the American Civil Liberties Union (ACLU), Roger Nash Baldwin, to teach the Japanese about civil liberties. MacArthur ignored members of the House Un-American Activities Committee and the FBI who believed that Baldwin was a Soviet-loving communist; he wanted an expert to quickly introduce western-style civil rights to the Japanese. Baldwin helped found the Japan Civil Liberties Union.

MacArthur ruled Japan with a soft-handed approach. He legalized the Japanese Communist Party (despite reservations from the U.S. government) out of a desire for Japan to be truly democratic. He ordered the release of all political prisoners. The first May Day parade in 11 years in 1946 was greenlit by MacArthur. On the day before the May Day celebrations, which involved 300,000 Japanese communists demonstrating, a group led by Hideo Tokayama who planned to assassinate MacArthur were stopped and some of its members were arrested. Despite this plot the May Day demonstrations went on. MacArthur stopped the Communist Party from gaining popularity by conducting landmark land reform that made MacArthur more popular with Japanese farmers. In the 1946 election the communists won only six seats.

MacArthur was also in charge of southern Korea from 1945 to 1948. There was no plan or guideline given by Washington on how to rule Korea, so what resulted was a tumultuous three-year military occupation that led to the creation of the Republic of Korea in 1948. He ordered Lieutenant General John R. Hodge to govern that area on SCAP's behalf and report to him.

MacArthur remained in Japan until relieved by President Harry S. Truman on 11 April 1951. The San Francisco Peace Treaty, signed on 8 September 1951, marked the end of the Allied occupation.

=== 1948 presidential election ===
In 1948, MacArthur made a bid for the Republican nomination for president, the most serious of several efforts he made over the years. MacArthur's status as one of America's most popular war heroes together with his reputation as the statesman who had "transformed" Japan gave him a strong basis for running, but his lack of connections within the GOP were a major handicap. MacArthur's strongest supporters came from the quasi-isolationist, Midwestern wing of the Republicans, a diverse collection of "Old Right" and Progressive Republicans united by a belief that the U.S. was too involved in Europe. MacArthur declined to campaign for the presidency, but he privately encouraged his supporters to put his name on the ballot.

MacArthur had always stated he would retire when a peace treaty was signed with Japan, and his push in the fall of 1947 to have the U.S. sign a treaty was intended to allow him to retire on a high note, and thus campaign for the presidency. For the same reasons, Truman subverted his efforts, saying that more time was needed before the U.S. could formally make peace with Japan. Truman in fact was so worried about MacArthur becoming president that in 1947 Truman asked Eisenhower to run for president with himself as his running mate. In 1951 he again asked Eisenhower to run. When Eisenhower asked, "What about MacArthur?" Truman said, "I'm going to take care of MacArthur."

Without a peace treaty, MacArthur decided not to resign while at the same time writing letters to Wood saying he would be happy to accept the Republican nomination if it were offered. On 9 March 1948, he issued a press statement declaring his interest in being the Republican nominee, but stated he would not resign from the Army to campaign. The press statement had been forced by Wood, who told MacArthur that it was impossible to campaign for a man who was not officially running for president, and that MacArthur could either declare his candidacy or see Wood cease campaigning for him. MacArthur's supporters made a major effort to win the Wisconsin primary, but MacArthur's refusal to campaign badly hurt his chances. Defeats in Wisconsin and Nebraska effectively ended MacArthur's chances of winning the Republican nomination, but he refused to withdraw until the 1948 Republican National Convention, at which Thomas Dewey was nominated.

== Korean War ==
=== South to the Naktong, North to the Yalu ===
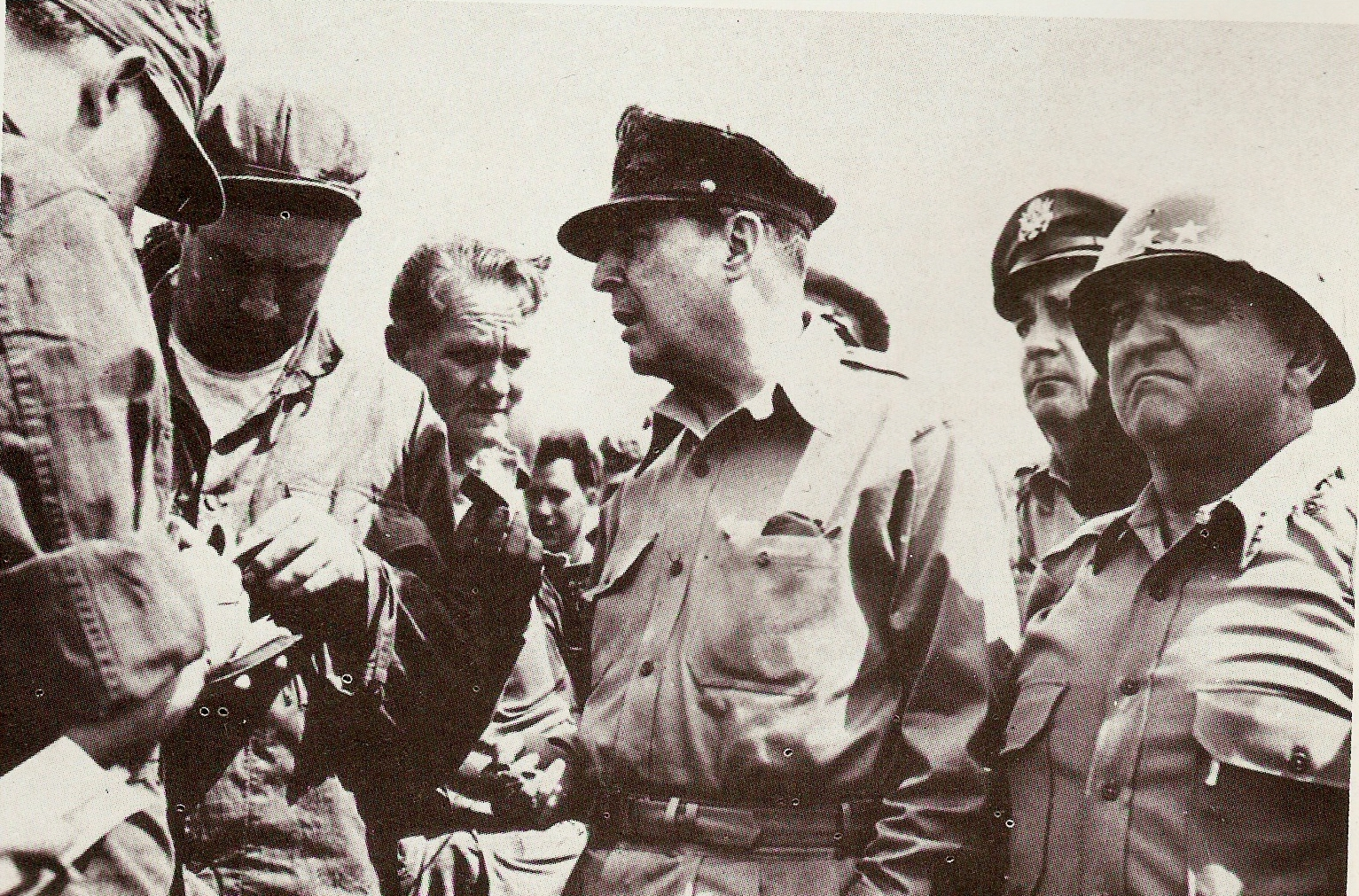
MacArthur confers with Lieutenant General Walton Walker (right) and other soldiers of the Eighth Army in July 1950.

On 25 June 1950, North Korea invaded South Korea, starting the Korean War. The United Nations Security Council authorized a United Nations Command (UNC) force to assist South Korea. The UN empowered the American government to select a UNC commander, and the Joint Chiefs of Staff unanimously recommended MacArthur. All South Korean forces were placed under his command. As they retreated before the North Korean onslaught, MacArthur received permission to commit U.S. ground forces. All the first units to arrive could do was trade men and ground for time, falling back to the Pusan Perimeter. By the end of August, the crisis subsided. North Korean attacks on the perimeter had tapered off. While the North Korean force numbered 88,000 troops, Lieutenant General Walton Walker's Eighth Army now numbered 180,000, and he had more tanks and artillery.

In September, despite lingering concerns from superiors, MacArthur's soldiers and Marines made a successful landing at Inchon, deep behind North Korean lines. Launched with naval and air support, the landing recaptured Seoul and forced the North Koreans to retreat northward in disarray. Visiting the battlefield on 17 September, MacArthur surveyed six tanks that had been knocked out by Marines, ignoring sniper fire around him, except to note that the North Korean marksmen were poorly trained.

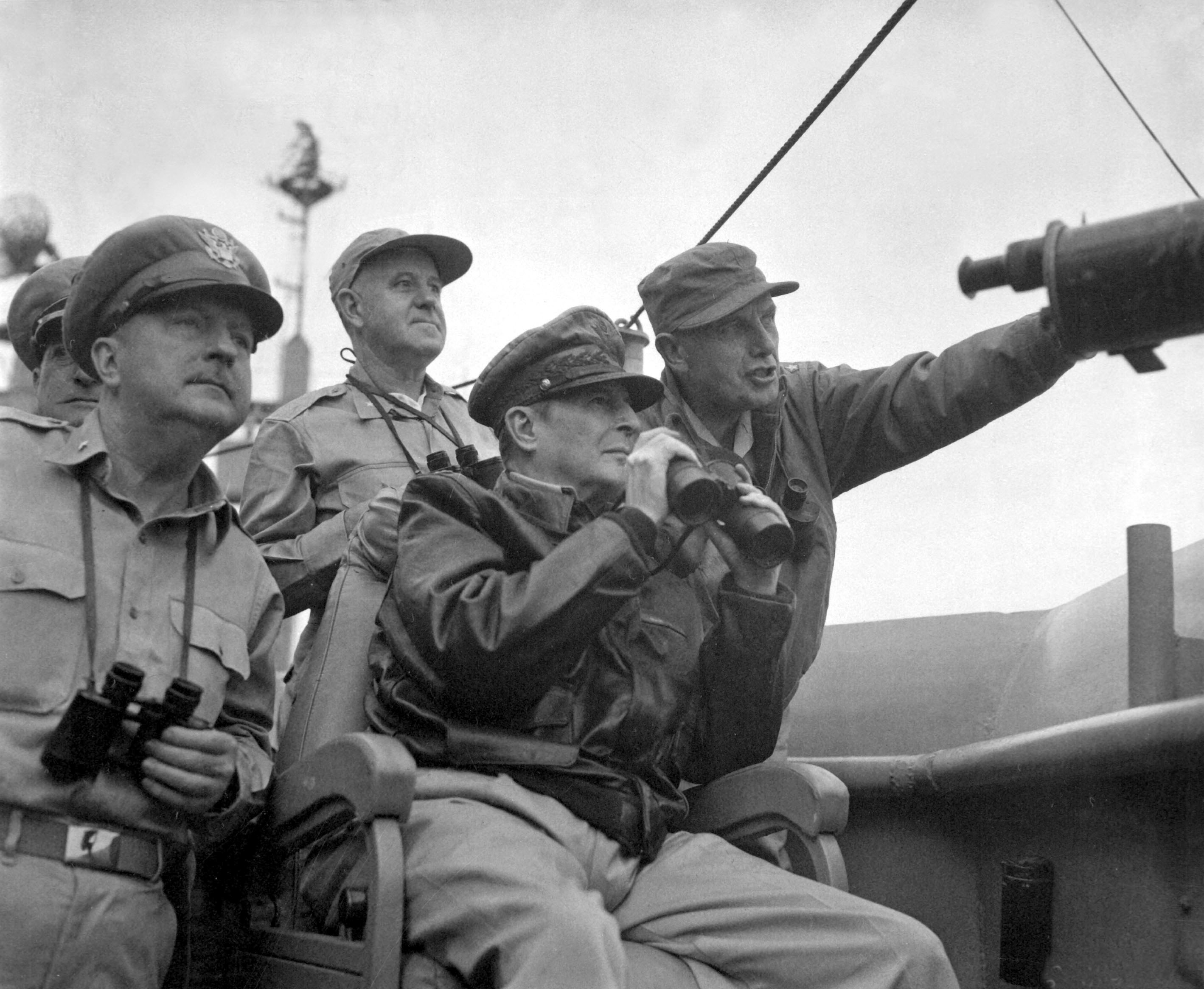
MacArthur observes the naval shelling of Inchon from USS Mount McKinley, 15 September 1950 with Brigadier General Courtney Whitney (left) and Major General Edward M. Almond (right).

MacArthur was informed about the massacres of thousands of alleged communists and communist sympathizers by South Korean forces in the summer of 1950, but, following long-established State Department policy, he described it as an "internal matter." Archival research by the Associated Press found documents classified "secret" by the Pentagon and State Department in Washington, that indicated that MacArthur made no attempts to curb the summary mass killings.

On 11 September, Truman ordered an advance into North Korea. Truman, Secretary of State Dean Acheson, Secretary of Defense George Marshall, U.S. Ambassador to the UN Warren R. Austin, and the British and French governments all agreed on the decision to invade and occupy all of North Korea. MacArthur, busy with the Pusan Perimeter defense and the upcoming Inchon landings, had nothing to do with this decision. There was controversy over whether U.S. troops should cross the 38th parallel with only the approval from the U.S. government because the original UN resolution only called for the restoration of South Korea below the 38th parallel. MacArthur was hesitant but Marshall ordered MacArthur on 30 September to feel "unhampered tactically and strategically to proceed north of 38th parallel." This ambiguity was finally resolved by the UN General Assembly greenlighting MacArthur to advance northward on 4 October, authorizing him and UN forces to unify all of Korea under the Republic of Korea.

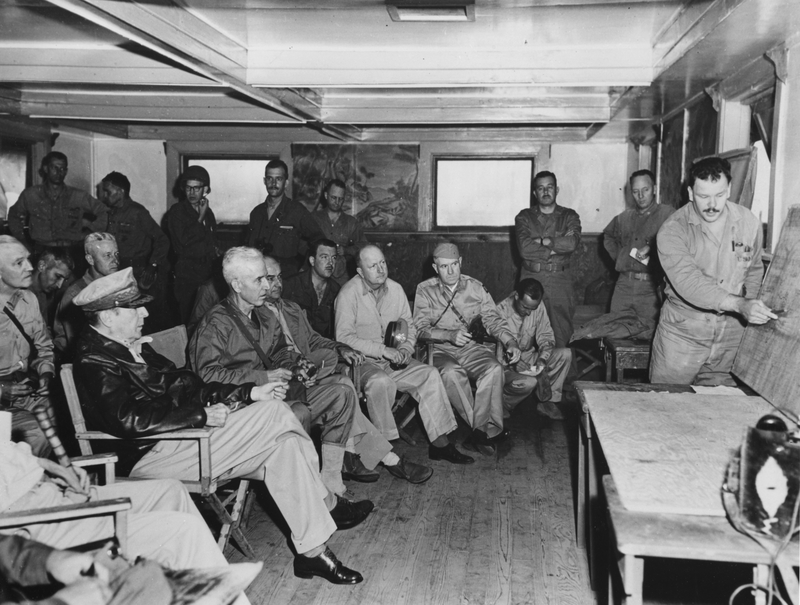
MacArthur at the 1st Marine Division headquarters in Inchon in September 1950

MacArthur now planned another amphibious assault, on Wonsan on the east coast, but it fell to South Korean troops before the 1st Marine Division could reach it by sea. In October, MacArthur met with Truman at the Wake Island Conference. MacArthur reassured Truman, commenting: "I can assure you one thing, Mr. President, if you ever have to run against a military man, his name won't be MacArthur." The president awarded MacArthur his fifth Distinguished Service Medal. Briefly questioned about the Chinese threat, MacArthur dismissed it; he regarded the possibility of Soviet intervention as a more serious threat.

On 20 October, MacArthur flew to the Sukchon-Sunchon area of North Korea, north of Pyongyang, to supervise an airborne operation by the 187th Airborne Regimental Combat Team. MacArthur's unarmed airplane was attacked by enemy aircraft. MacArthur received a Distinguished Flying Cross.

The enemy were engaged by the UN forces at the Battle of Unsan in late October, which demonstrated the presence of Chinese soldiers in Korea. Nevertheless, Willoughby downplayed the evidence about Chinese intervention. MacArthur flew over the front line in his Douglas C-54 Skymaster but saw no signs of a Chinese build up and therefore decided to wait before ordering an advance or withdrawal. Evidence of the Chinese activity was hidden; the Chinese Army traveled at night and dug in during the day. For his reconnaissance efforts, MacArthur was nonetheless awarded the honorary combat pilot's wings.

=== China enters the war ===
China considered the UN offensive to its border a serious threat to its security. China's fears of an invasion were reinforced by MacArthur's public statements that he wanted to bomb China and use Kuomintang forces stationed in Formosa to augment UN forces in the Korean peninsula in response to China first initiating hostile actions against UN troops in North Korea. MacArthur was banned by Truman from sending any airplanes, even reconnaissance planes, over Chinese territory and his pilots complained to him about Chinese (and also very likely Soviet) jets illegally attacking them inside North Korean territory. For the purpose of domestic mobilization, the Chinese government lied about how the war started by falsely claiming MacArthur initiated the hostilities when he landed his troops at Inchon. The theory that Chinese leader Mao Zedong only entered the war because of MacArthur's Yalu offensive and comments was accepted for many decades, but research from historian Arthur L. Herman and others in the 2010s showed that Mao planned on directly intervening in the Korean War since July 1950.

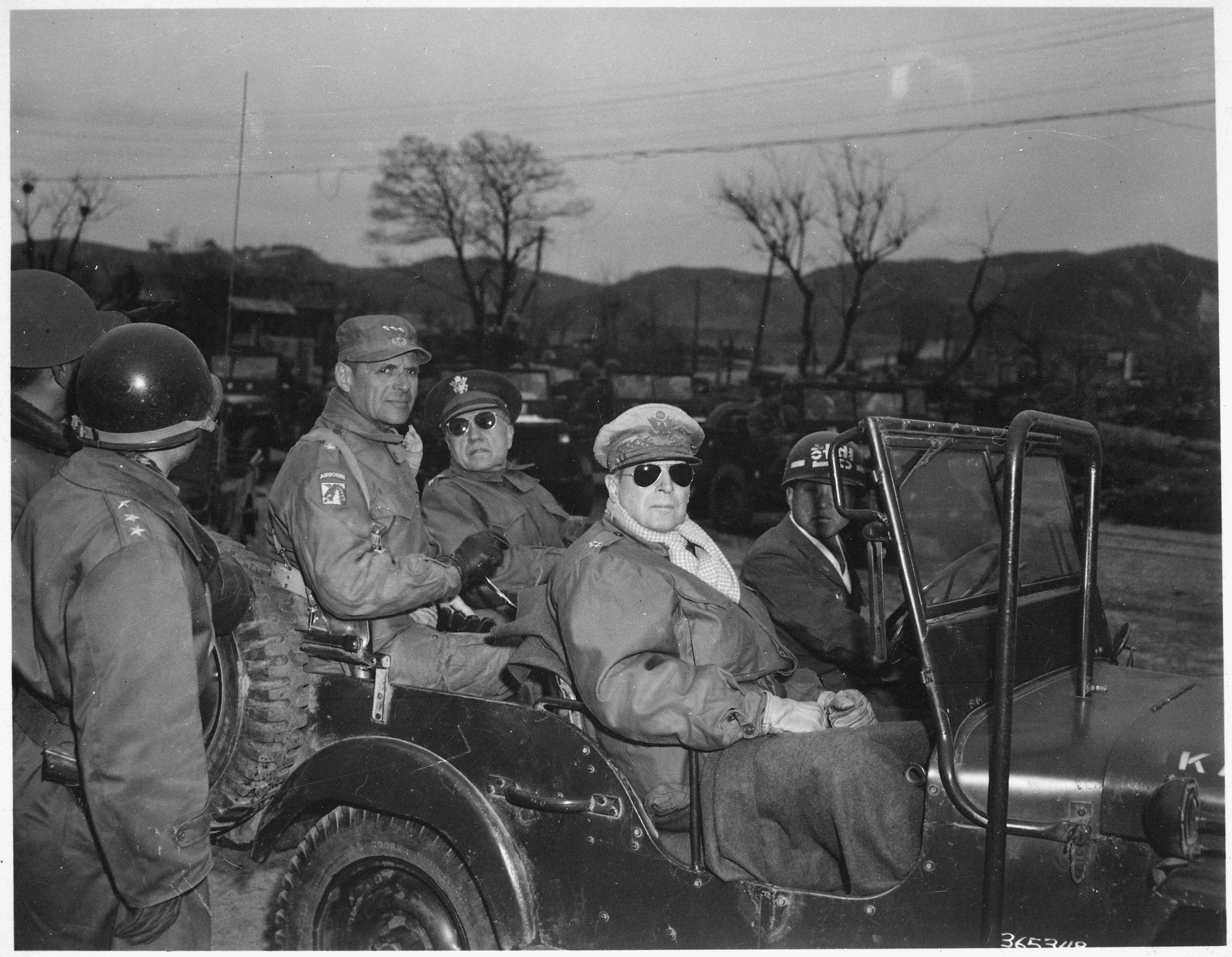
From right to left: MacArthur, Major General Doyle Hickey, and General Matthew Ridgway in a jeep at a UN command post, April 1951, just eight days before MacArthur's removal

On 25 November 1950, Walker's Eighth Army was attacked by the Chinese Army and soon the UN forces were in retreat. MacArthur provided US Army chief of staff General J. Lawton Collins with nine successive withdrawal lines. On 23 December, Walker was killed when his jeep collided with a truck. He was replaced by Lieutenant General Matthew Ridgway, whom MacArthur had selected in case of such an eventuality. Ridgway noted that MacArthur's "prestige, which had gained an extraordinary luster after Inchon, was badly tarnished."

Collins discussed the possible use of nuclear weapons in Korea with MacArthur in December, and later asked him for a list of targets in the Soviet Union in case it entered the war. MacArthur testified before Congress in 1951 that he had never recommended the use of nuclear weapons, and considered but did not recommend a plan to cut off North Korea with radioactive poisons, although he broached the latter with Eisenhower, then president-elect, in 1952. In 1954, in an interview published after his death, he stated he would have dropped atomic bombs on enemy air bases. In 1960, he challenged a statement by Truman that he had advocated using atomic bombs; Truman issued a retraction, stating that he had no evidence. In January 1951, MacArthur refused to entertain proposals for the forward deployment of nuclear weapons to cover a UN retreat in Korea as proposed by Truman.

In April 1951, the Joint Chiefs of Staff drafted orders for MacArthur authorizing nuclear attacks on Manchuria and the Shandong Peninsula if the Chinese launched airstrikes originating from there against his forces. The next day Truman met with the chairman of the United States Atomic Energy Commission, Gordon Dean, and arranged for the transfer of nine Mark 4 nuclear bombs to military control. Dean was apprehensive about delegating the decision on how they should be used to MacArthur, who lacked expert technical knowledge of the weapons. The Joint Chiefs were not entirely comfortable about giving them to MacArthur either, for fear that he might prematurely carry out his orders. Instead, they decided that the nuclear strike force would report to the Strategic Air Command.

=== Removal from command ===
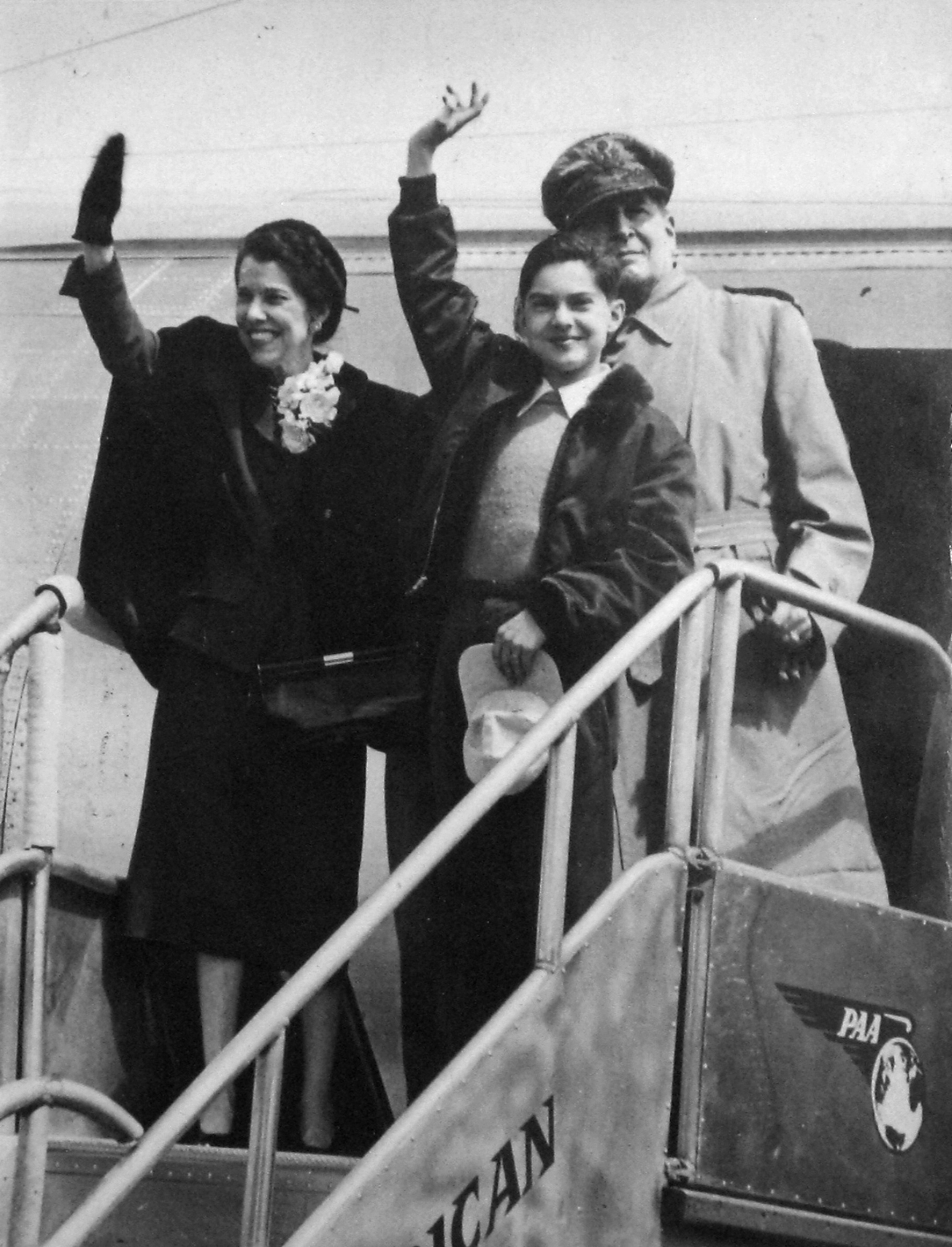
Douglas MacArthur (rear), Jean MacArthur, and son Arthur MacArthur IV returning to the Philippines for a visit in 1950

Within weeks of the Chinese attack, MacArthur was forced to retreat from North Korea. Seoul fell in January 1951, and both Truman and MacArthur were forced to contemplate abandoning Korea entirely. European countries did not share MacArthur's world view, distrusted his judgment, and were afraid that he might use his influence with the American public to re-focus American policy away from Europe and towards Asia. They were concerned that this might lead to a major war with China, possibly involving nuclear weapons. Since in February 1950 the Soviet Union and China had signed a defensive alliance, the possibility that an American attack on China would cause World War III was considered to be very real.

Under Ridgway's command, the Eighth Army pressed north again in January. He inflicted heavy casualties on the Chinese, recaptured Seoul in March 1951, and pushed on to the 38th Parallel. With the improved military situation, Truman now saw the opportunity to offer a negotiated peace but, on 24 March, MacArthur called upon China to admit that it had been defeated, simultaneously challenging both the Chinese and his own superiors. Truman's proposed announcement was shelved. On 5 April, Representative Joseph William Martin Jr., the Republican leader in the House of Representatives, read aloud on the floor of the House a letter from MacArthur critical of Truman's Europe-first policy and limited-war strategy. The letter concluded:

It seems strangely difficult for some to realize that here in Asia is where the communist conspirators have elected to make their play for global conquest, and that we have joined the issue thus raised on the battlefield; that here we fight Europe's war with arms while the diplomats there still fight it with words; that if we lose the war to communism in Asia the fall of Europe is inevitable, win it and Europe most probably would avoid war and yet preserve freedom. As you pointed out, we must win. There is no substitute for victory.

In March 1951, secret US intercepts of diplomatic dispatches disclosed clandestine conversations from Spanish and Portuguese diplomats in Tokyo to their home countries in which they claimed that MacArthur expressed confidence to them that he would succeed in "disposing of the Chinese Communist question" once and for all. Truman was enraged that MacArthur was supposedly not only trying to increase public support for his position on conducting the war but had secretly communicated with foreign governments. The President was unable to act since he could not afford to reveal that the US was reading the coded messages of friendly countries and because of MacArthur's popularity with the public and political support in Congress. However, following the release by Martin of MacArthur's letter, Truman concluded he could relieve MacArthur of his commands without incurring unacceptable political damage.

Truman summoned Marshall, Bradley, Acheson and Averell Harriman to discuss what to do about MacArthur. They concurred MacArthur should be relieved of his command but made no recommendation to do so. Although the Joint Chiefs felt that it was correct "from a purely military point of view", they were aware that there were important political considerations. Although Truman and Acheson thought that MacArthur was insubordinate, the Joint Chiefs avoided any suggestion of this. Insubordination was a military offense, and MacArthur could have requested a public court martial, which might well have found him not guilty and ordered his reinstatement. The Joint Chiefs agreed that there was "little evidence that General MacArthur had ever failed to carry out a direct order of the Joint Chiefs or acted in opposition to an order". Bradley insisted, "MacArthur had stretched but not legally violated any JCS directives. He had violated the President's 6 December directive [not to make public statements on policy matters], relayed to him by the JCS, but this did not constitute violation of a JCS order." Truman ordered MacArthur's relief by Ridgway, and the order went out on 10 April with Bradley's signature.

The relief of the famous general by the unpopular politician created public controversy. Polls showed that the majority of the public disapproved of the decision. Beginning on 3 May 1951, a Joint Senate Committee investigated MacArthur's removal. Its bipartisan conclusion was that "the removal of General MacArthur was within the constitutional powers of the President but the circumstances were a shock to national pride."

== Later life ==
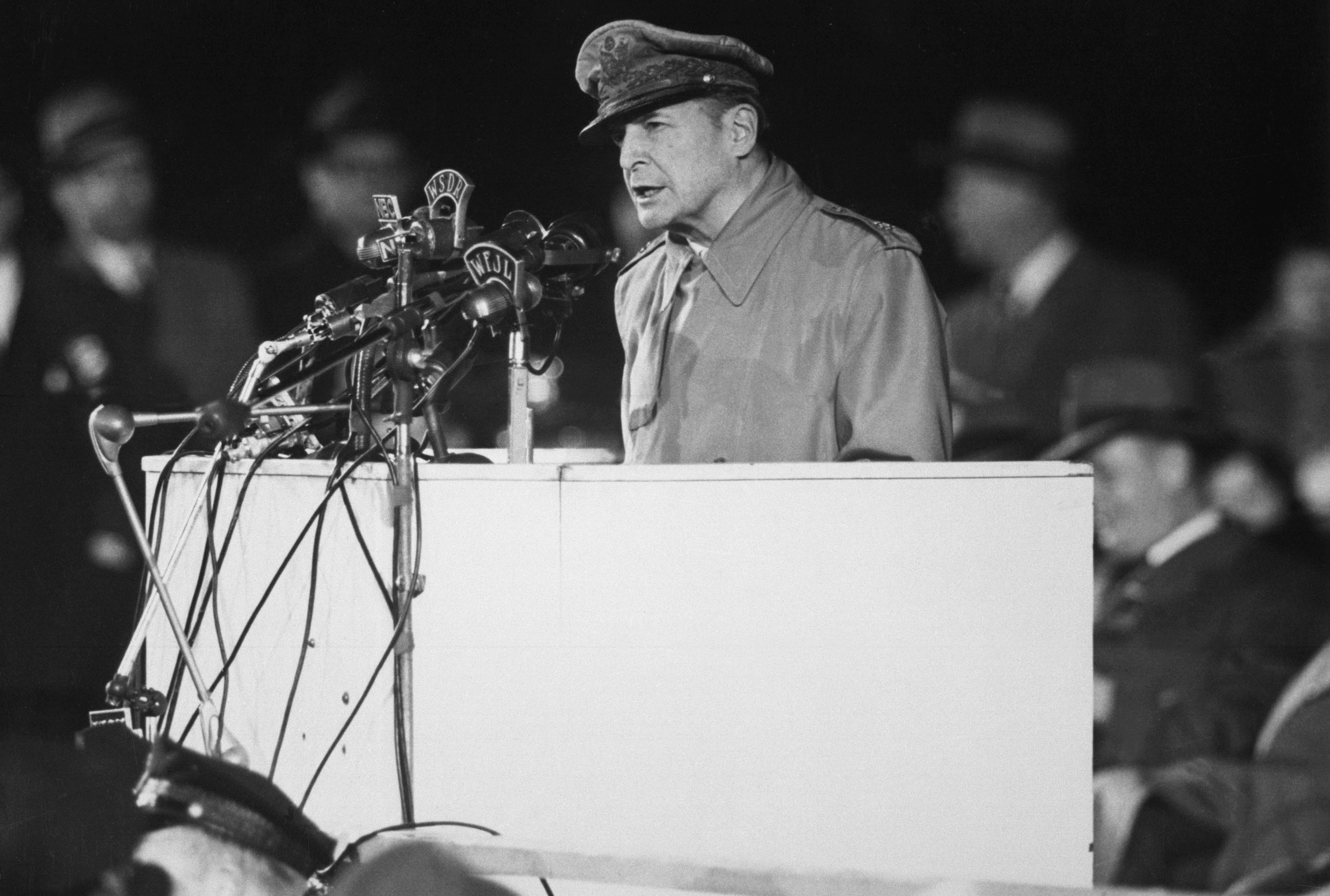
MacArthur speaking at Soldier Field in Chicago in 1951

A day after his arrival in San Francisco from Korea on 18 April 1951, MacArthur flew with his family to Washington, D.C., where he was scheduled to address a joint session of Congress. It was his and Jean's first visit to the continental United States since 1937, when they had been married; Arthur IV, now aged 13, had never been to the U.S. On 19 April, MacArthur made his last official appearance in a farewell address to the U.S. Congress defending his side of his disagreement with Truman over the conduct of the Korean War. During his speech, he was interrupted by fifty ovations. MacArthur ended the address saying:

When I joined the Army, even before the turn of the century, it was the fulfillment of all of my boyish hopes and dreams. The world has turned over many times since I took the oath on the plain at West Point, and the hopes and dreams have long since vanished, but I still remember the refrain of one of the most popular barrack ballads of that day which proclaimed most proudly that "old soldiers never die; they just fade away".

And like the old soldier of that ballad, I now close my military career and just fade away, an old soldier who tried to do his duty as God gave him the light to see that duty.

Good Bye.

MacArthur received public adulation, which aroused expectations that he would run for president, but he was not a candidate. He carried out a speaking tour in 1951–52 attacking the Truman administration for "appeasement in Asia" and for mismanaging the economy. Initially attracting large crowds, by early 1952 MacArthur's speeches were attracting decreasing numbers as many complained that MacArthur seemed more interested in settling scores with Truman and praising himself than in offering up a constructive vision for the nation.

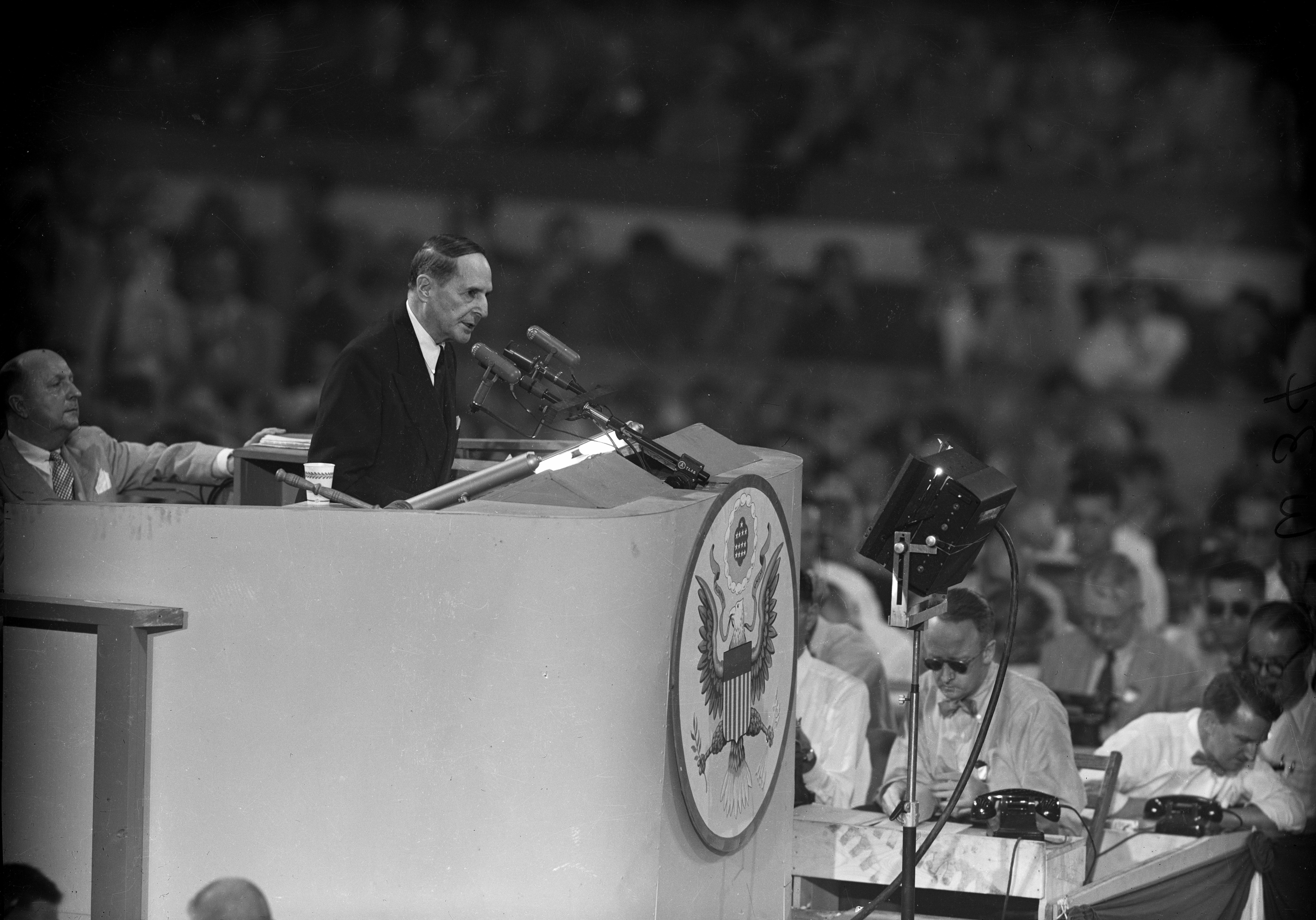
MacArthur delivering the keynote address at the 1952 Republican National Convention

MacArthur felt uncomfortable campaigning for the Republican nomination and hoped that at the 1952 Republican National Convention, a deadlock would ensue between Senator Robert A. Taft and General Dwight Eisenhower for the presidential nomination. MacArthur's plan was to then step in and offer himself as a compromise candidate. His unwillingness to campaign seriously hurt his viability as a candidate. In the end, MacArthur endorsed Taft and was keynote speaker at the convention. Taft ultimately lost the nomination to Eisenhower, who went on to win the general election in a landslide. Once elected, Eisenhower consulted with MacArthur, his former commanding officer, about ending the war in Korea.

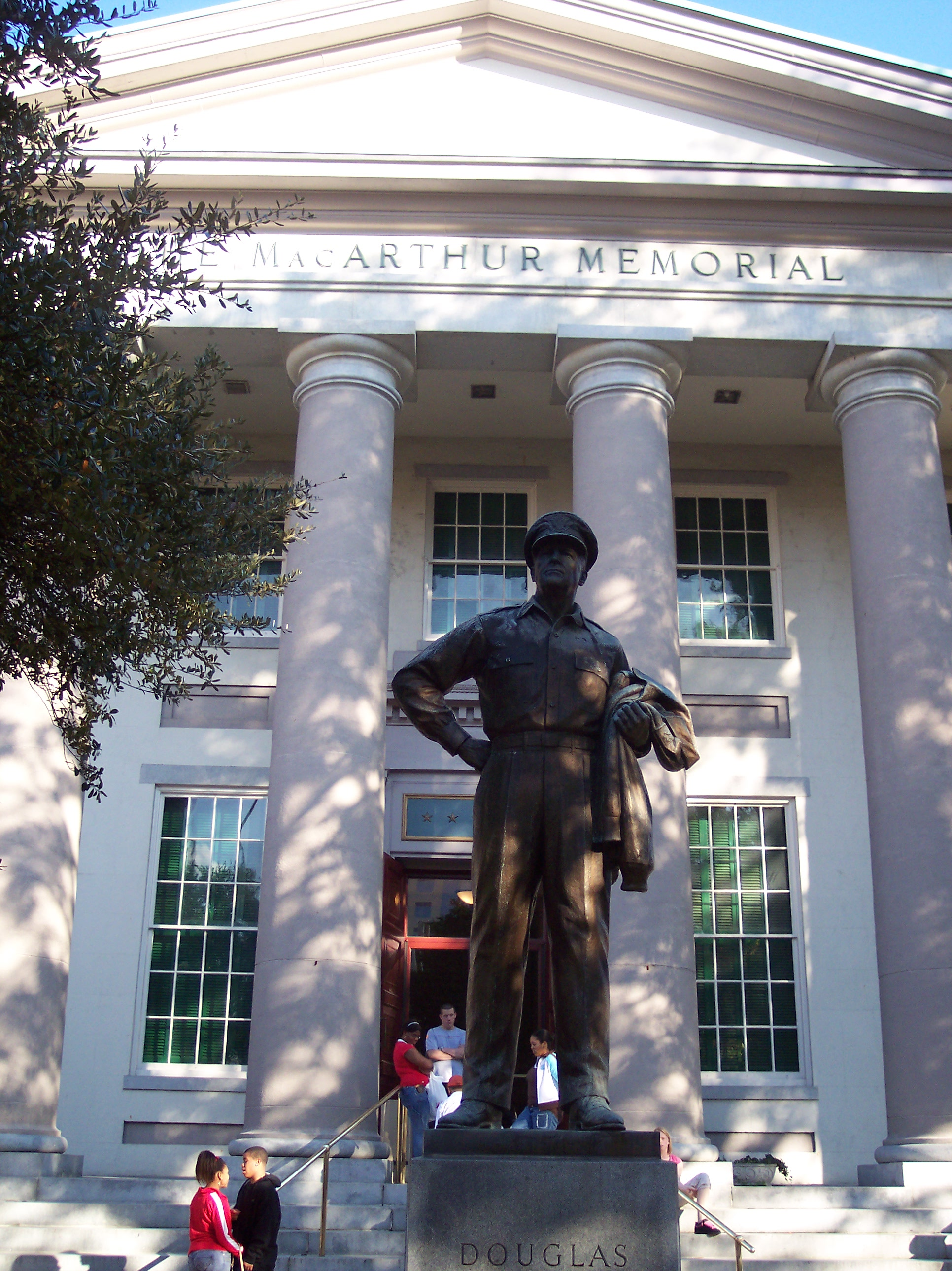
Douglas MacArthur Memorial in Norfolk, Virginia. The statue is a duplicate of the one at West Point. The base houses a time capsule which contains MacArthur, Norfolk and MacArthur Foundation memorabilia.

Douglas and Jean MacArthur spent their last years together in the Waldorf-Astoria Hotel. He was elected chairman of the board of Remington Rand in 1952. In that year, he earned a salary of $68,000, as well as $20,000 pay and allowances as a General of the Army (equivalent to $661,000 and $194,000 in 2025, respectively). The Waldorf became the setting for an annual birthday party on 26 January thrown by the general's former deputy chief engineer, Major General Leif J. Sverdrup.

At the 1960 celebration for MacArthur's 80th birthday, many of his friends were startled by the general's visibly deteriorating health. The next day, he collapsed and was rushed into surgery to control a severely swollen prostate. In June 1960, he was decorated by the Japanese government with the Grand Cordon of the Order of the Rising Sun with Paulownia Flowers, the highest Japanese order which may be conferred on an individual who is not a head of state. Upon receiving the honor, MacArthur said:

No honor I have ever received moves me more deeply than this one. Perhaps this is because I can recall no parallel in the history of the world where a great nation recently at war has so distinguished its former enemy commander. What makes it even more poignant is my own firm disbelief in the usefulness of military occupations with their corresponding displacement of civil control.

After his recovery, MacArthur began to prepare for his death. He visited the White House for a final reunion with Eisenhower. In 1961, to commemorate the fifteenth anniversary of Filipino independence, an eighty-one-year-old MacArthur made a "sentimental journey" to the Philippines, where he was decorated by President Carlos P. Garcia with the Philippine Legion of Honor and met with cheering crowds. MacArthur also accepted an advance of $900,000 (equivalent to $7.4 million in 2025) from Henry Luce for the rights to his memoirs, and wrote the volume that would eventually be published as Reminiscences. Sections began to appear in serialized form in Life magazine in the months before his death.

President John F. Kennedy solicited MacArthur's counsel in 1961 and 1962. The first of three meetings was held shortly after the Bay of Pigs invasion. MacArthur was extremely critical of the military advice given to Kennedy and cautioned the young president to avoid a U.S. military build-up in Vietnam, pointing out that domestic problems should be given a much greater priority. MacArthur later gave similar advice to President Lyndon B. Johnson. In August 1962 Kennedy summoned MacArthur for counsel at the White House after receiving intelligence that the Soviets were preparing to transport nuclear weapons to Cuba. "The greatest weapon of war is the blockade," MacArthur advised Kennedy. Kennedy imposed a naval blockade during the Cuban Missile Crisis two months later. When Kennedy was urged to increase U.S. involvement in Laos and Vietnam by generals, politicians, and advisors he would tell them, "you go back and convince General MacArthur, then I'll be convinced."

In 1962, West Point honored the increasingly frail MacArthur with the Sylvanus Thayer Award for outstanding service to the nation. In August 1962, MacArthur returned to Washington, D.C., to receive the Thanks of Congress. This was his first trip to Congress since April 1951. Congress unanimously passed a special resolution to give him this award for his military leadership during and following World War II and also "for his many years of effort to strengthen the ties between the Philippines and the United States". This honor dates back to the American Revolutionary War and has rarely been given to anybody after the Civil War. Two months later MacArthur was awarded the Congressional Gold Medal.

In 1963, President Kennedy asked MacArthur to help mediate a dispute between the National Collegiate Athletic Association and the Amateur Athletic Union over control of track sports. The dispute threatened to derail the participation of the United States in the 1964 Summer Olympics. His presence helped to broker a deal.

== Illness and death ==
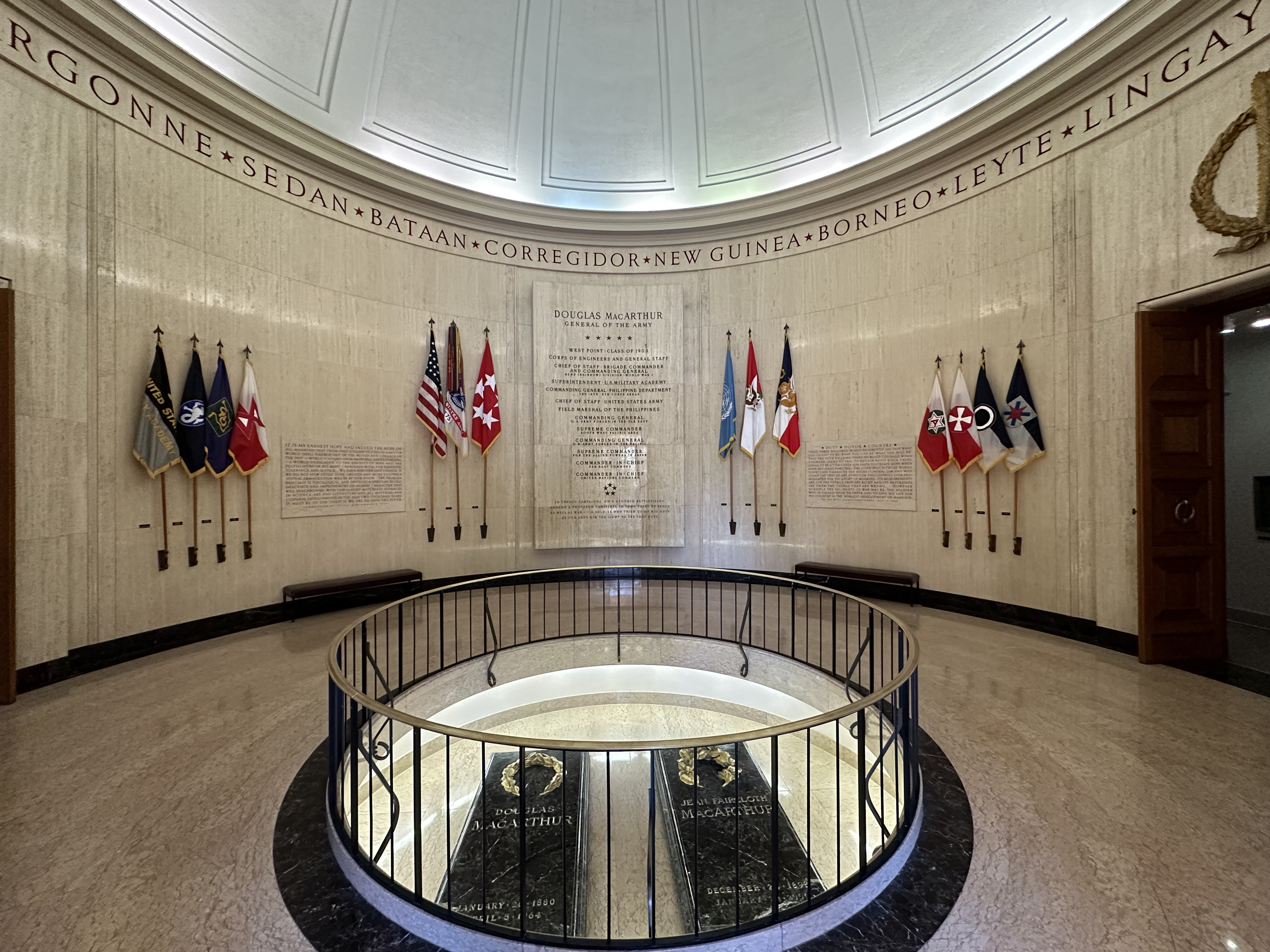
The tomb of Douglas and Jean MacArthur at the MacArthur Memorial in Norfolk, Virginia

On 2 March 1964, MacArthur was admitted to Walter Reed Army Medical Center due to stomach pains and was diagnosed with moderate jaundice. He died in the hospital after surgery on 5 April 1964, of primary biliary cholangitis aged 84. Kennedy had authorized a state funeral before his own death in 1963, and Johnson ordered that MacArthur be buried "with all the honor a grateful nation can bestow on a departed hero". On 7 April his body was taken to New York City, where it lay in an open casket at the Park Avenue Armory. That night it was taken by train to Washington Union Station and transported by a funeral procession to the Capitol, where it lay in state. An estimated 150,000 people filed by the bier.

MacArthur had requested to be buried in Norfolk, Virginia, where his mother had been born. On 11 April, his funeral service was held in St Paul's Episcopal Church in Norfolk and his body was laid to rest in the rotunda of the Norfolk City Hall.

== Legacy ==
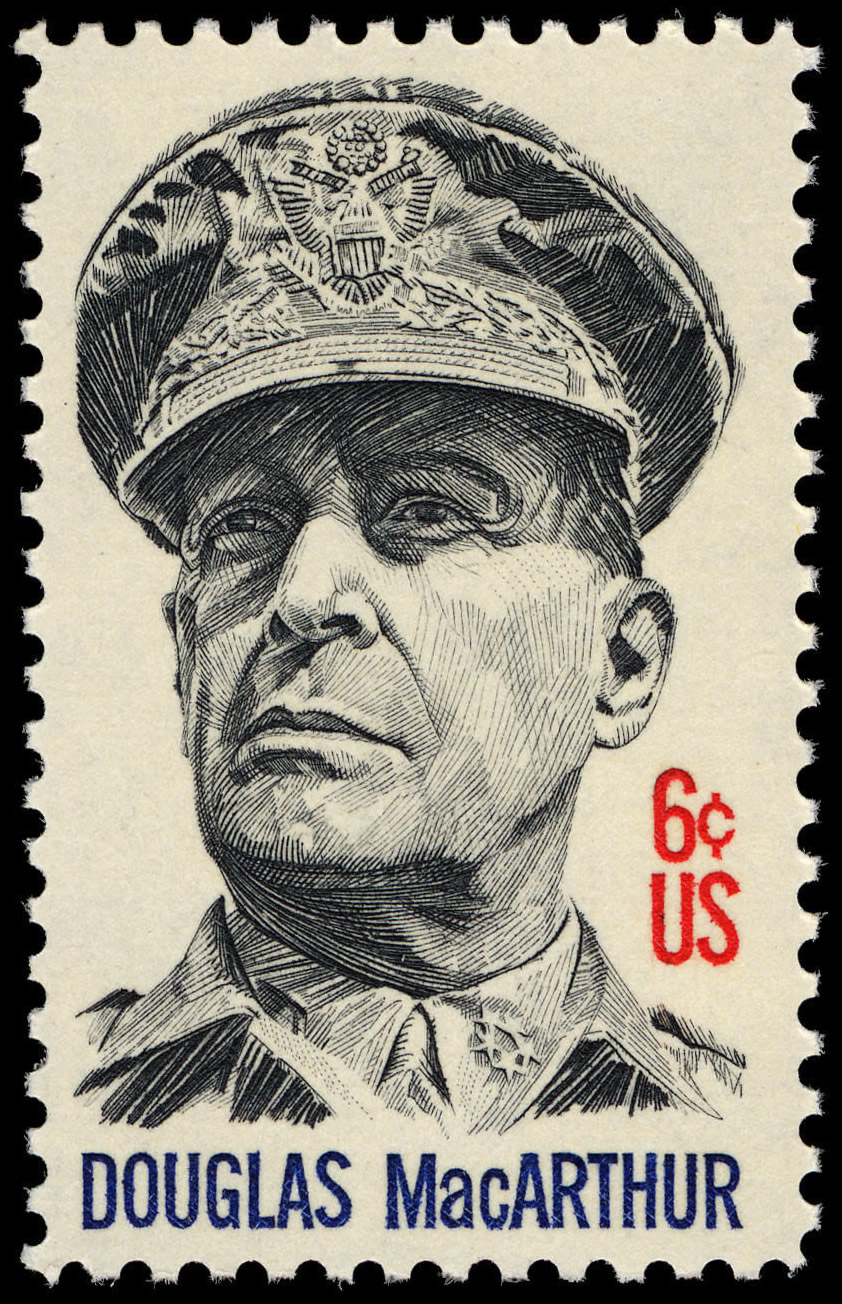
A 1971 MacArthur commemorative postage stamp

MacArthur has a contested legacy. In the Philippines in 1942, he suffered a defeat that Gavin Long described as "the greatest in the history of American foreign wars". However, according to Walter R. Borneman:

in a fragile period of the American psyche when the general American public, still stunned by the shock of Pearl Harbor and uncertain what lay ahead in Europe, desperately needed a hero, they wholeheartedly embraced Douglas MacArthur—good press copy that he was. There simply were no other choices that came close to matching his mystique, not to mention his evocative lone-wolf stand—something that has always resonated with Americans.

MacArthur's concept of the role of the soldier as including civil affairs, quelling riots and low-level conflict was dismissed by the majority of officers who had fought in Europe during World War II and afterwards saw the Army's role as fighting the Soviet Union. British Field Marshal Viscount Alanbrooke stated that MacArthur outshone all of his contemporary American and British generals and that the blend of his strong personality, grasp of tactics, operative mobility and vision had put him in such class, on par with or even greater than Genghis Khan and Napoleon Bonaparte. Truman's relief of MacArthur cast a long shadow over American civil–military relations for decades, and "left a lasting current of popular sentiment that in matters of war and peace, the military really knows best", a philosophy which became known as "MacArthurism".

MacArthur has been portrayed as a reactionary, although he was in many respects ahead of his time. He championed a progressive approach to the reconstruction of Japan. He was often out of step with contemporaries in his insistence that the future lay in the Far East, implicitly rejecting White American contemporary notions of racial superiority. He treated Filipino and Japanese leaders as equals. At the same time, his Victorian sensibilities recoiled at leveling Manila with aerial bombing, an attitude the World War II generation regarded as old-fashioned.

In Korean shamanism, MacArthur is venerated as a god.

=== Honors and awards ===
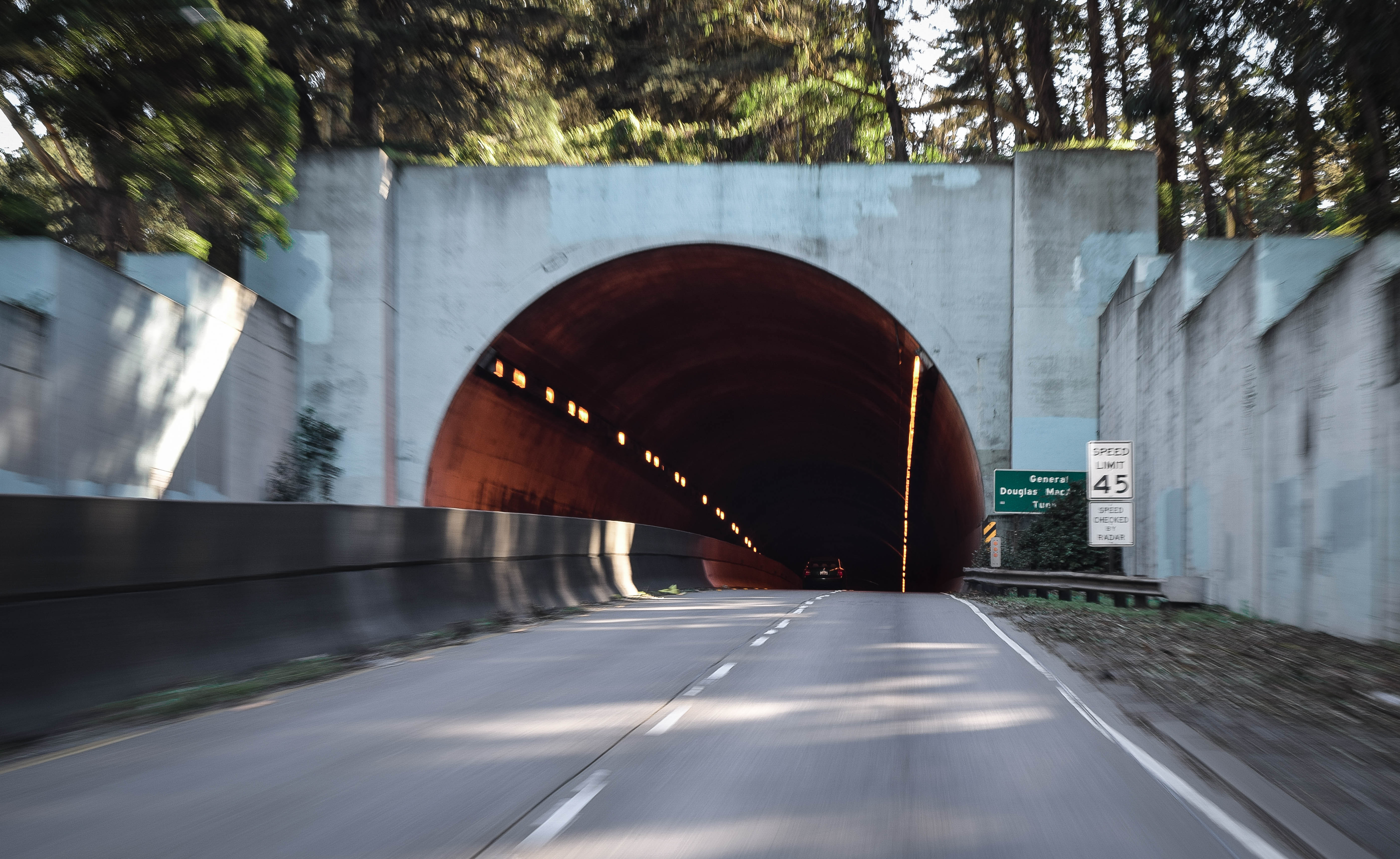
The West entrance of the MacArthur Tunnel in San Francisco, California

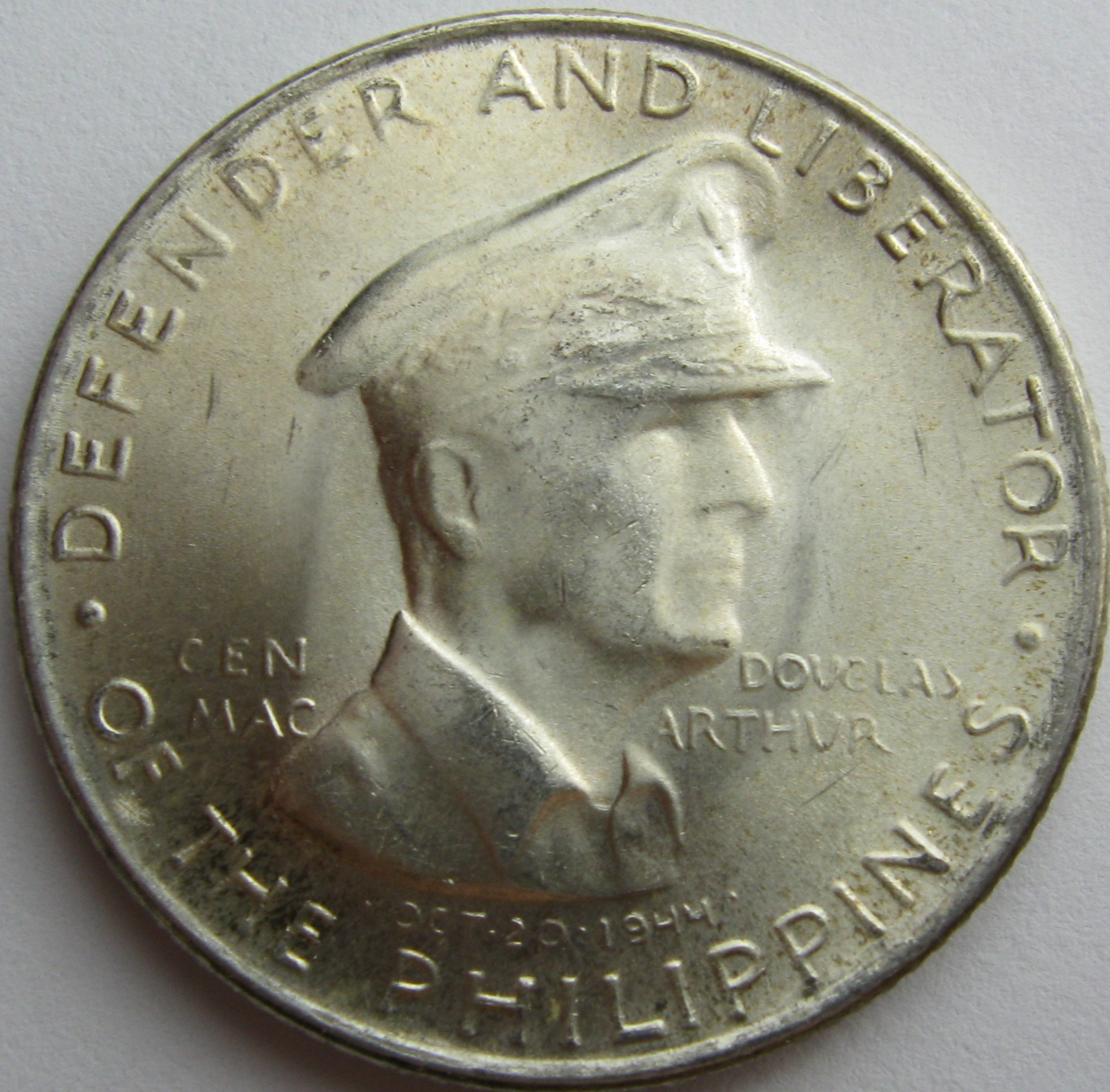
MacArthur was the subject of two different legal tender commemorative coins in the Philippines in 1947. Filipino coins of MacArthur were also struck in 1980, the 100th anniversary of his birth, and in 2014, the 70th anniversary of the Leyte landings.

The MacArthur Memorial in Norfolk consists of three buildings containing nine museum galleries. At its heart is a sunken circular crypt with two marble sarcophagi, one for MacArthur, the other for Jean. The MacArthur Chambers in Brisbane, Australia, hosts the MacArthur Museum on the 8th floor where MacArthur had his office. The Dai-Ichi Seimei Building in Tokyo has preserved MacArthur's 6th floor office as it was from 1945 to 1951. The city of Incheon erected a statue of MacArthur in Jayu Park in 1957.

MacArthur earned over 100 military decorations from the U.S. and other countries including the Medal of Honor, the French Legion of Honour and Croix de guerre, the Order of the Crown of Italy, the Order of Orange-Nassau from the Netherlands, the Honorary Knight Grand Cross of the Order of the Bath from Australia, and the Order of the Rising Sun with Paulownia Flowers, Grand Cordon from Japan. MacArthur was enormously popular with the American public. Streets, public works, children, and even a dance step were named after him. In 1955, his promotion to General of the Armies was proposed in Congress, but the proposal was shelved. He was named Gallup's Most Admired Person in 1946 and 1947 and Most Admired Man in 1951. A 1961 Time article said that "to Filipinos, MacArthur [was] a hero without flaw". In 1961 MacArthur traveled to Manila one final time and was greeted by a cheering crowd of two million.

Since 1987, the General Douglas MacArthur Leadership Awards are presented annually by the US Army on behalf of the General Douglas MacArthur Foundation to recognize officers who have demonstrated "duty, honor, country". Since 1989, the U.S. Army Cadet Command on behalf of the General Douglas MacArthur Foundation annually presents the MacArthur Award to the eight best U.S. Army ROTC programs. The MacArthur Leadership Award at the Royal Military College of Canada is awarded to the graduating officer cadet who demonstrates outstanding leadership performance.

== Dates of rank ==
| Insignia | Rank | Component | Date |
|---|---|---|---|
| None | Cadet | United States Military Academy | 13 June 1899 |
| No pin insignia in 1903 | Second Lieutenant, Engineers | Regular Army | 11 June 1903 |
| | First Lieutenant, Engineers | Regular Army | 23 April 1904 |
| | Captain, Engineers | Regular Army | 27 February 1911 |
| | Major, Engineers | Regular Army | 11 December 1915 |
| | Colonel, Infantry | National Army | 11 August 1917 (Date of rank: 5 August 1917.) |
| | Brigadier General | National Army | 11 July 1918 (Date of rank: 26 June 1918.) |
| | Brigadier General | Regular Army | 28 February 1920 (Date of rank: 20 January 1920.) |
| | Major General | Regular Army | 17 January 1925 |
| | General | Temporary | 21 November 1930 |
| | Reverted to Major General | Regular Army | 1 October 1935 |
| | General | Retired list | 1 January 1938 |
| | Major General | Regular Army | 26 July 1941 (Recalled to active duty.) |
| | Lieutenant General | Army of the United States | 27 July 1941 |
| | General | Army of the United States | 22 December 1941 (Date of rank: 16 September 1936.) |
| | General of the Army | Army of the United States | 18 December 1944 |
| | General of the Army | Regular Army | 23 March 1946 |

== Bibliography ==
- MacArthur, Douglas (1942). Waldrop, Frank C (ed.). MacArthur on War. New York: Duell, Sloan and Pearce. OCLC 1163286.
- —— (1952). Revitalizing a Nation; a Statement of Beliefs, Opinions, and Policies Embodied in the Public Pronouncements of Douglas MacArthur. Chicago: Heritage Foundation. OCLC 456989. Archived from the original on 17 March 2021.
- —— (1964). Reminiscences. New York: McGraw-Hill. OCLC 562005.
- —— (1965). Whan, Vorin E Jr. (ed.). A Soldier Speaks; Public Papers and Speeches of General of the Army, Douglas MacArthur. New York: Praeger. OCLC 456849.
- —— (1965). Courage was the Rule: General Douglas MacArthur's Own Story (Juvenile audience) (abridged ed.). New York: McGraw-Hill. OCLC 1307481.
- —— (1965). Duty, Honor, Country; a Pictorial Autobiography (1st ed.). New York: McGraw-Hill. OCLC 1342695.
- —— (1966). Willoughby, Charles A (ed.). Reports of General MacArthur (4 Volumes). Washington, D.C.: U.S. Government Printing Office. OCLC 407539.

== Notes ==
Military offices
| Preceded by Charles D. Rhodes | Commanding General 42nd Division; November 1918 | Succeeded by Clement Flagler |
| Preceded by Samuel E. Tillman | Superintendent of the United States Military Academy; 1919–1922 | Succeeded by Fred Winchester Sladen |
| Preceded by Charles Summerall | Chief of Staff of the United States Army; 1930–1935 | Succeeded by Malin Craig |
| New office | Supreme Commander for the Allied Powers; 1945–1951 | Succeeded by Matthew Ridgway |
Party political offices
| Preceded by Dwight H. Green | Keynote Speaker of the Republican National Convention; 1952 | Succeeded by Arthur B. Langlie |
Awards
| Preceded by Dwight D. Eisenhower | Recipient of the Sylvanus Thayer Award; 1962 | Succeeded by John J. McCloy |
Honorary titles
| Preceded by John F. Kennedy | Persons who have lain in state or honor in the United States Capitol rotunda 1964 | Succeeded by Herbert Hoover |
