= General Marshall (disambiguation) =

George C. Marshall (1880–1959) was an American soldier and statesman. General Marshall may also refer to:

- Francis Marshall (U.S. Army officer) (1867–1922), U.S. Army general
- Francis Marshall (British Army officer) (1876–1942), British Army major general
- Frederick Marshall (British Army officer) (1829–1900), British Army lieutenant general
- George Frederick Leycester Marshall (1843–1934), British Indian Army major general
- Humphrey Marshall (general) (1812–1872), Confederate States Army brigadier general
- James C. Marshall (1897–1977), U.S. Army Corps of Engineers brigadier general
- Richard Marshall (United States Army officer) (1895–1973), U.S. Army major general
- S.L.A. Marshall (1900–1977), U.S. Army brigadier general
- St. Julien R. Marshall (1904–1989), U.S. Marine Corps brigadier general
- Thomas Marshall (general) (1793–1853), U.S. Army brigadier general
- William Marshall (British Army officer) (1865–1939), British Army lieutenant general
- William Louis Marshall (1846–1920), U.S. Army brigadier general
- Winton W. Marshall (1919–2015), U.S. Air Force lieutenant general

== See also ==
- James Marshall-Cornwall (1887–1985), British Army general
- Attorney General Marshall (disambiguation)
