= The Hollow (Markham, Virginia) =

Historic house in Virginia, United States

- The Hollow House
- U.S. National Register of Historic Places
- Virginia Landmarks Register
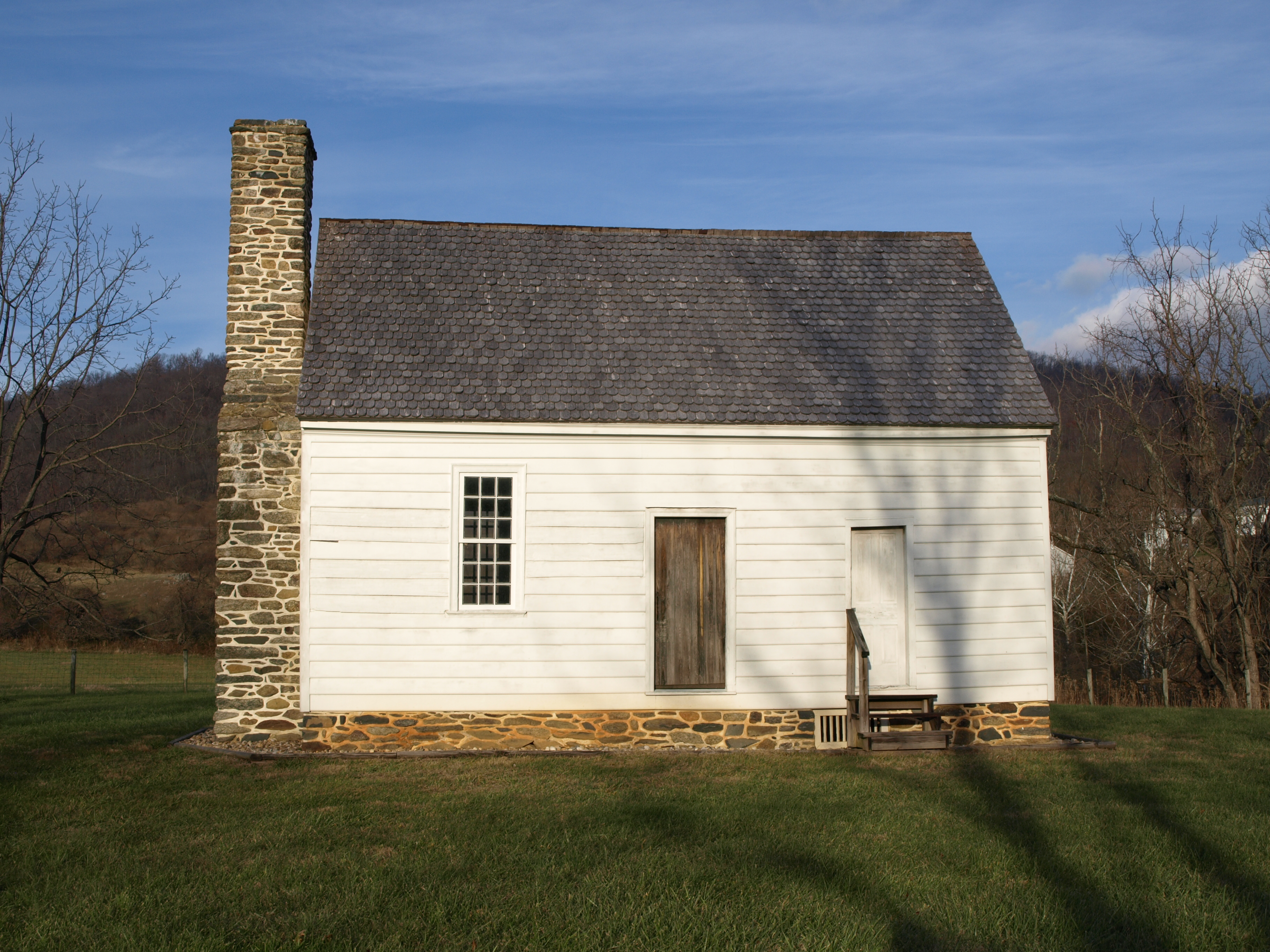

- Location within Northern Virginia Location within Virginia Location within the United States
- Location: VA 688, Leeds Manor Rd. and north of Marshall School Ln., near Markham, Virginia
- Coordinates: 38.90936°N 77.99381°W
- Area: 322.32 acres (130.44 ha)
- Built: 1763–64
- Built by: Colonel Thomas Marshall
- Architectural style: Colonial
- NRHP reference No.: 03001442
- VLR No.: 030-0803

Significant dates
- Added to NRHP: January 16, 2004
- Designated VLR: September 10, 2003

The Hollow is an historic property and dwelling located near Markham, Fauquier County, Virginia, U.S. A part of the John Marshall's Leeds Manor Rural Historic District, it was the boyhood home of Chief Justice John Marshall, and includes the second-oldest dated home in the county. Both the property and the district are listed in the Virginia Landmarks Register (2003) and National Register of Historic Places (2004).

The property measures 322.32 acres (130.44 ha), and is situated about 24 miles north of Warrenton, the Fauquier County seat. It lies just north of the village of Markham and I-66. It is bounded on the west by Leeds Manor Road (State Route 688), on the south by Marshall School Lane, southeast by Beulah Road, east by Naked Mountain, and north by about 38.925° latitude and the Naked Mountain Winery.

The dwelling is a 1½-story, three-bay, Colonial-era frame structure, measuring about 28 by 16 feet (8.5 m × 4.9 m), built in 1763–64 near the southeast corner of the property, on a small ridge facing south towards Markham. It sits on an uncornsed fieldstone foundation. Also on the property are the contributing ruins of a meat house, built about 1763. The house was built by Colonel Thomas Marshall, a multi-term member of the House of Burgesses, county sheriff, clerk of the court, honored soldier and inventor, and father of Chief Justice of the United States Supreme Court John Marshall.
