= Randy Olson =

American marine biologist and filmmaker

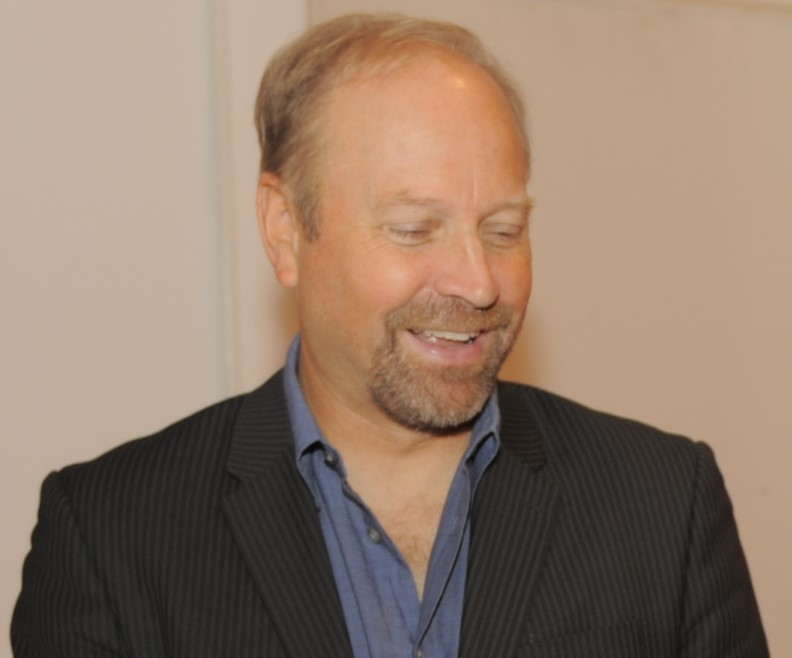
Olson in 2010

Richard Randolph "Randy" Olson is a marine biologist-turned-filmmaker.

He has written and directed a number of short films and feature documentaries which have premiered at film festivals such as Tribeca Film Festival and Telluride Film Festival. Most of his films address major science issues such as the decline of the world's oceans, the controversy around the teaching of evolution versus intelligent design, and the attacks on global warming science.

== Early life ==
Olson was born in Salt Lake City, Utah. He is the son of Colonel John Eric Olson. When he was four years old his family moved to Hawaii, where they lived for four years. Olson credits his time near the ocean in these years with his eventual career as a marine biologist.

== Science career ==
After dropping out of the University of Kansas, Olson worked on an oceanographic project in Puerto Rico. Olson then returned to college at the University of Washington. There he got involved in marine biological research along the outer coast of the Olympic Peninsula of Washington, spent a semester at Friday Harbor Marine Laboratory, and graduated with a B.A. in Zoology.

Olson received a Ph.D. in evolutionary biology from Harvard University in 1984. His dissertation research took him to Australia in the early 1980s studying coral reef ecology on the Great Barrier Reef. While conducting his research, he spent an entire year living on Lizard Island on the northern end of the Great Barrier Reef.

In Townsville, Australia, he was a postdoctoral fellow at the Australian Institute of Marine Science. He worked for the Australian government studying the problem of the crown-of-thorns starfish and its destructive effect on the Great Barrier Reef.

In 1988 Olson was appointed a professor in the Zoology Department at the University of New Hampshire. His research on the dispersal of larvae of marine organisms on coral reefs has been described as "some of the best work in that field". During his time at UNH Olson also produced several short films on marine life, such as Barnacles Tell No Lies, Lobstahs, and Salt of the Earth. Salt of the Earth was shown on a local PBS station. After being awarded tenure in 1994, Olson took a leave of absence to attend film school, eventually resigning his scientific position.

== Film career ==
Olson answering the question, "It’s actually a very entertaining film, but also has a serious message about the need to communicate the dire effects of global warming. How did you try to get that message across?" with regards to Sizzle

Olson earned his M.F.A. from the USC School of Cinematic Arts in 1997. For his student film he wrote and directed the twenty-minute musical comedy short film, His student film, You Ruined My Career, premiered at the 1996 Telluride Film Festival in the "Filmmakers of Tomorrow" showcase.

In 2002, Olson and coral reef ecologist Jeremy Jackson of Scripps Institution of Oceanography, created a 7-minute short film, Rediagnosing the Oceans. Olson expanded this work with the Shifting Baselines Ocean Media Project.

Olson directed the feature documentary, Flock of Dodos, which premiered at the 2006 Tribeca Film Festival. The film focused on the “ongoing debate between evolutionary biologists and those who espouse intelligent design.”

In 2008 Olson wrote and directed the mockumentary feature film, Sizzle, which “confronts global warming with humor.”

Olson partnered in 2019 with surf photographer Brian Bielmann and filmmaker Brent Storm to help produce the documentary feature White Rhino. The film documents the three massive swells that hit Fiji and Tahiti in 2011–12.

Olson has been criticized for potentially "dumbing down" serious science issues. His response is that his critics fail to grasp the difference between "dumbing down" and concision.

== Books ==
Olson has authored the following books and articles:

- Olson, Randy (2009). Don't Be Such a Scientist. Washington, DC: Island Press. ISBN 978-1597265638.
- Olson, Randy (6 December 2013). "Science Communication: Narratively Speaking". Science. 342 (6163): 1168. doi:10.1126/science.342.6163.1168-a. PMID 24311660.
- Olson, Randy; Barton, Dorie; Palermo, Brian (2013). Connection : Hollywood storytelling meets critical thinking. Los Angeles: Prairie Starfish Productions. ISBN 9780615872384.
- Olson, Randy (2015). Houston, We Have A Narrative: Why Science Needs Story. University of Chicago Press. ISBN 9780226270708.
- Olson, Randy (2019). Narrative Is Everything. Los Angeles: Kindle Direct Publishing. ISBN 978-1072232575.
- Olson, Randy (2020). THE NARRATIVE GYM: Introducing the ABT Framework For Messaging and Communication. Independently Published. ISBN 979-8550151402.
- Olson, Randy; Howell, Park (2021). The Narrative Gym for Business: Introducing the ABT Framework for Business Communication and Messaging. ISBN 979-8539288044.
- Olson, Randy; Passon, Doug (2022). The Narrative Gym for Law: Introducing the ABT Framework for Persuasive Advocacy. ISBN 979-8784837936.
- Olson, Randy; Gold, Dave (2022). The Narrative Gym for Politics: Introducing the ABT Framework for Political Communication and Messaging. ISBN 979-8789063293.
