= Winton W. Marshall =

United States Air Force general

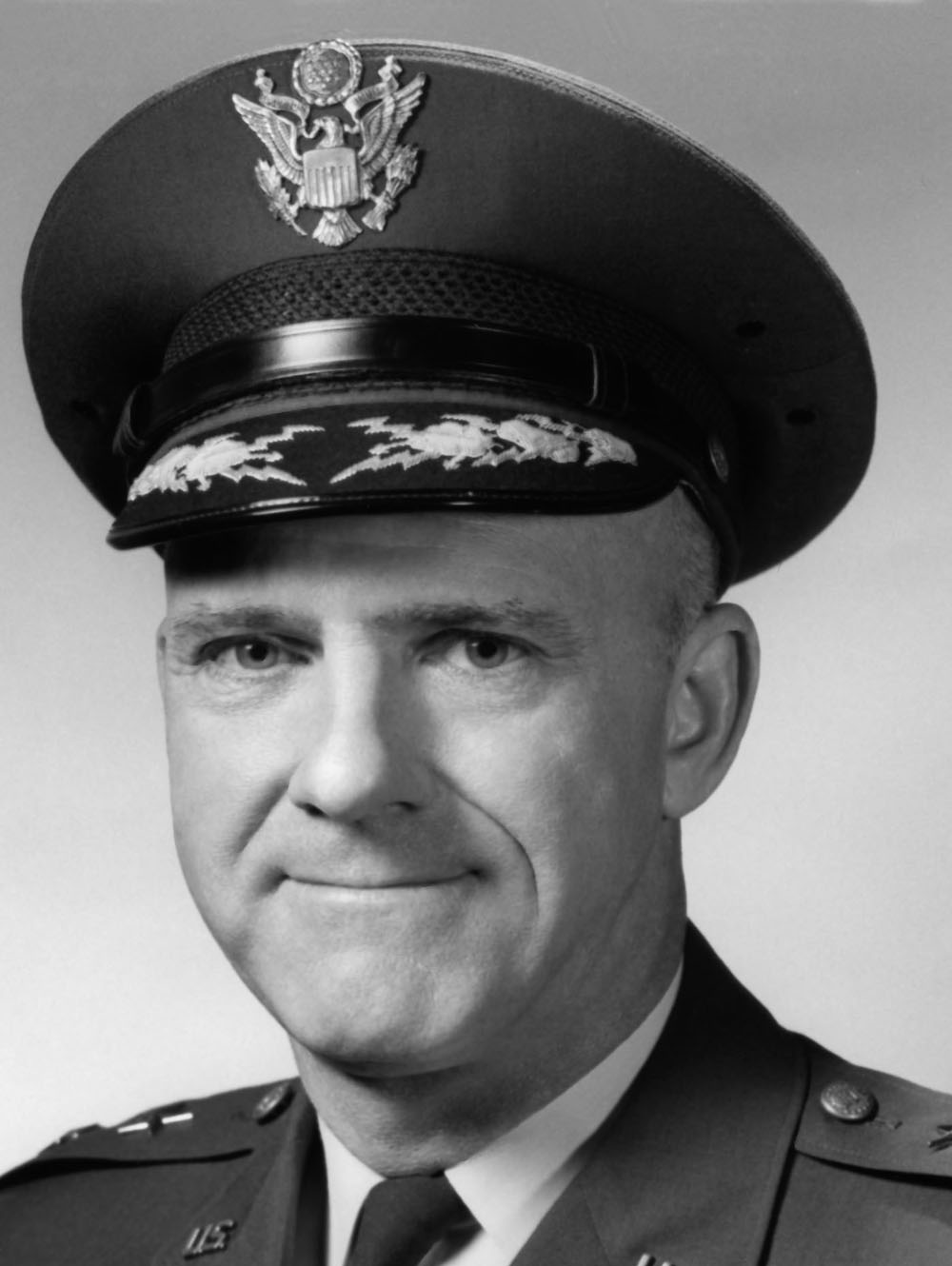
- Born: July 6, 1919; Detroit, Michigan, U.S.
- Died: September 19, 2015 (aged 96); Honolulu, Hawaii, U.S.
- Burial place: Arlington National Cemetery
- Military career
- Allegiance: United States
- Branch: United States Army Air Forces; United States Air Force
- Service years: 1942–1977
- Rank: Lieutenant General
- Nickname: Bones
- Units: 335th Fighter-Interceptor Squadron, 4th Fighter-Interceptor Wing
- Commands: 335th Fighter-Interceptor Squadron; 15th Fighter-Interceptor Squadron; 93d Fighter-Interceptor Squadron; 335th Fighter Squadron; NATO's Allied Defense Sector, 86th Air Division; Seventh Air Force; Pacific Air Forces
- Conflicts: World War II; Korean War; Vietnam War
- Awards: Air Force Distinguished Service Medal (2); Silver Star; Legion of Merit (4); Distinguished Flying Cross (3); Bronze Star Medal; Air Medal (6); Purple Heart

Lieutenant General Winton Whittier Marshall (July 6, 1919 – September 19, 2015) was a United States Air Force general and flying ace. He was deputy commander in chief, U.S. Readiness Command, with headquarters at MacDill Air Force Base in Florida before retiring in 1977.

== Early life ==
Winton Whittier Marshall was born on July 6, 1919, in Detroit, Michigan.

== Military career ==
Marshall began his military career as an aviation cadet in 1942. He completed flight training at Yuma Army Air Base in Arizona, and received his pilot's wings and commission as a second lieutenant in April 1943. Assigned to Las Vegas Army Air Field in Nevada, he began as a pilot with the 326th Fighter Gunnery Training Group before becoming chief of the Bell P-39 Airacobra Training Section there. In February 1945 he went to the Panama Canal Zone as a pilot with the 28th Fighter Squadron and as operations officer of the 32nd Fighter Squadron, later redesignated the 23rd Fighter Squadron, 36th Fighter Group.

In July 1947, he was transferred to Dow Field, Maine, as operations officer of the 48th Fighter Squadron, 14th Fighter Group, the first squadron to be assigned the F-84 Thunderjet, and participated in service testing the F-84 at Edwards Air Force Base in California.

Marshall entered the Air Tactical School at Tyndall Air Force Base in Florida, in August 1948 and four months later became operations officer of the 84th Fighter Squadron at Hamilton Air Force Base in California.

=== Korean War ===
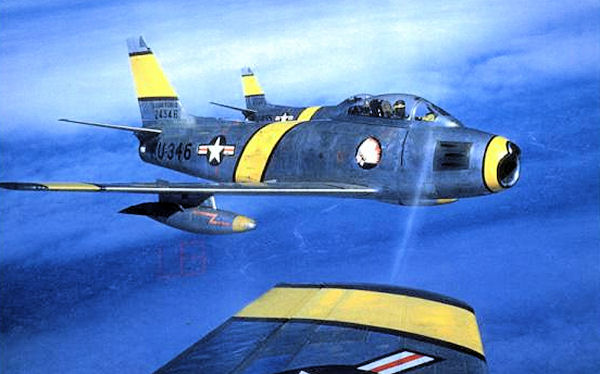
North American F-86F Sabres of the 335th Fighter-Interceptor Squadron "Chiefs" over Korea

In May 1951, Marshall was appointed as commander of the 335th Fighter-Interceptor Squadron, during the Korean War. Stationed at Kimpo Air Base in South Korea, he flew missions in the F-86 Sabre. Marshall shot down his first and second MiG-15s on September 1 and 2, 1951, respectively, over Sinanju.

Marshall shot down two more MiG-15s, including a shared destruction, on November 28. One of these fighters was flown by German Shatalov, a Soviet flying ace with five aerial victories against U.S. aircraft. On November 30, 1951, the 335th Fighter-Interceptor Squadron and other squadrons within the 4th Fighter-Interceptor Wing intercepted a People's Liberation Army Air Force aerial formation consisting of nine Tupolev Tu-2 bombers and 16 Lavochkin La-11s, that was attempting an aerial raid on the Cho'do Island. Marshall shot down one Tu-2 and one La-11, crediting with his fourth and fifth aerial victories and thus earning the title of flying ace. As he was attempting to shoot another La-11, which was flown by Chinese pilot Wang Tianbao, Marshall overshot as the La-11 turned hard left, resulting in the La-11 making a long deflection shot which struck the left wing of Marshall's F-86. Wang saw the F-86 going down in a spin and claimed an F-86 kill, after he returned to his base in Northeast China. However, Marshall managed to regain consciousness and recovered his F-86 from the spin. He flew his crippled aircraft to Suwon Air Base, where it was repaired and Marshall was treated for his wounds. For his heroism during the aerial combat on November 30, he was awarded the Silver Star.

After his recovery, Marshall continued flying combat missions. He shot down his fourth MiG-15 and sixth overall aerial victory on December 5, 1951. Marshall became the fifth jet ace of the Korean War, credited with 6 1/2 enemy aircraft destroyed, seven probable, and six damaged, while flying 100 missions. In January 1952, he returned to the United States to command the 93rd Fighter-Interceptor Squadron at Kirtland Air Force Base in New Mexico.

=== Post war ===
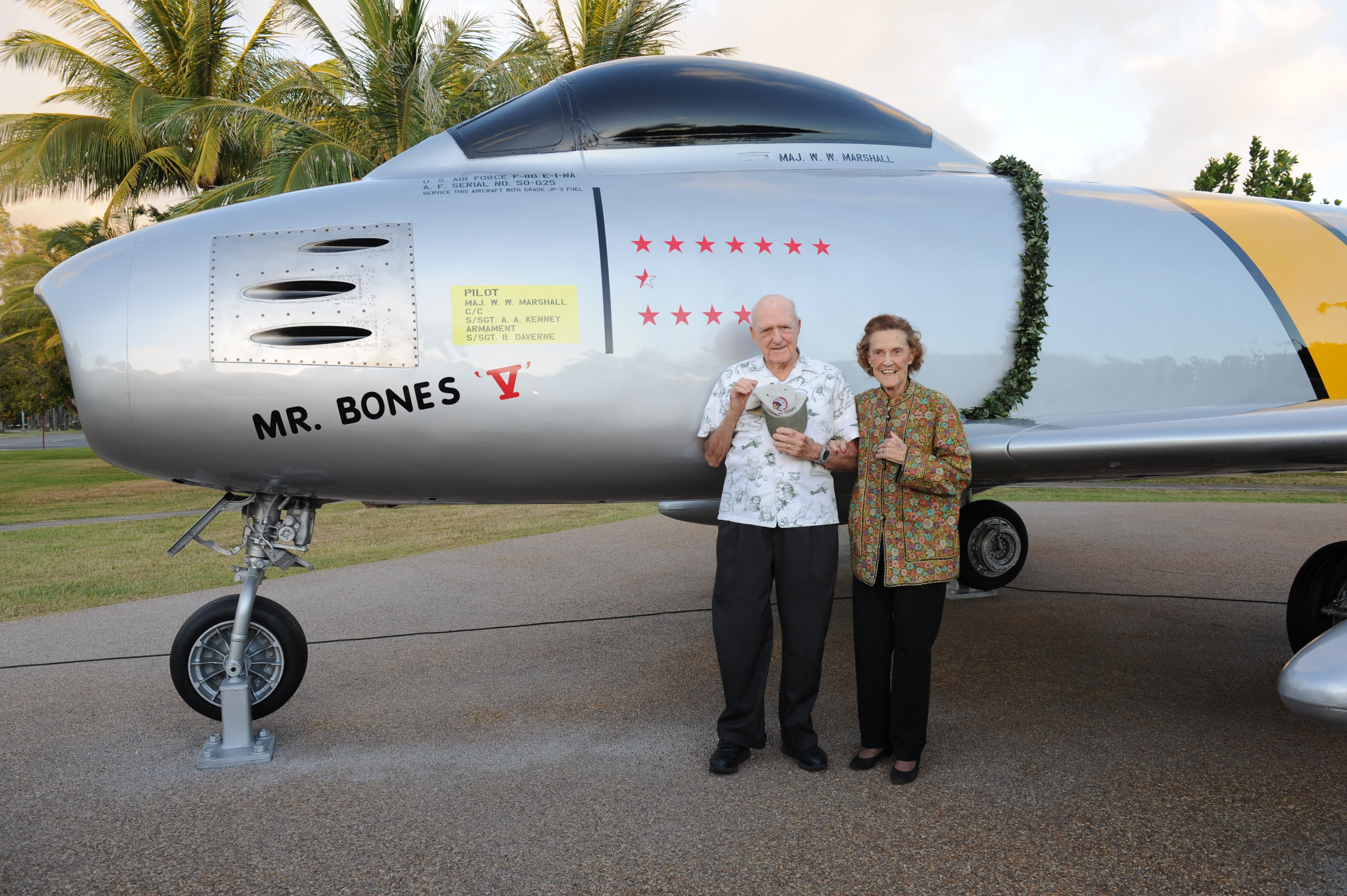
Marshall and his wife stand next to a static F-86 display dedicated in his honor, at Hickam AFB, Hawaii (2011)

Marshall was assigned as commander of the 15th Fighter-Interceptor Squadron at Davis-Monthan Air Force Base in Arizona, in July 1953. There, Marshall was credited with saving a Strategic Air Command B-47 bomber which was on fire at the end of a runway. Seeing no crash or fire-fighting equipment coming, and noting that the crew had escaped, he taxied his F-86 to the burning aircraft and blew out the fire with his jet exhaust. For this action, Marshall was named to the Strategic Air Command's Heads-Up Club. He flew in the 1953 Bendix transcontinental air race, and captained the Central Air Defense Force Team in the 1953 and 1954 Air Defense Command Weapons Meet.

In July 1954, Marshall became chief of the Central Air Defense Force Tactical Evaluation Board at Richards-Gebaur Air Force Base in Missouri, where he established the first tactical evaluation system in the Air Defense Command; developed the first wind-driven tow reel target system; and headed a team of military and civilian technicians that extended radar search capability (later known as the Marshall fix) of fighter-interceptor aircraft from 30 to 200 miles (50 to 300 km). In 1957, he was chief of the Central Air Defense Force Bendix Trophy Race Team flying the F-102 Delta Dagger, with his team taking first and second place.

Marshall entered the Air War College at Maxwell Air Force Base in Alabama, in 1958, and on graduation was assigned to the 49th Tactical Fighter Wing in France as deputy commander for operations. The wing was transferred to Spangdahlem, West Germany, where he was instrumental in getting the first strobe light landing system on an operational military base in Europe. Marshall assumed command of NATO's Allied Defense Sector in the 86th Air Division at Ramstein Air Base in West Germany, in January 1961. There he was credited with the development of an open-loop combat air defense communications network providing an immediate reaction system to cope with the East German and Czechoslovak MiG threat. He also played a key role in the programming and installation of the 412-L Semi-automatic Air Defense System linking the 86th Air Division and the U.S. Army surface-to-air missile system. He went to Headquarters U.S. Air Force at the Pentagon in Washington, D.C., in June 1964, to serve in the Directorate of Operations successively as deputy chief and chief of the Air Defense Division, and as deputy director for forces. From June 1966 to July 1967, he served in the Joint Chiefs of Staff as deputy director of operations, J-3 in the National Military Command Center, and chief of the European Division, Directorate of Plans, J-5.

In May 1968, Marshall was assigned as chief of staff, Allied Air Forces Southern Europe in Naples, Italy, and in September 1969 became director of plans, J-5, U.S. European Command, at Vaihingen, West Germany. During the Vietnam War, he was appointed as vice commander of the Seventh Air Force at Tan Son Nhut Air Base in South Vietnam, in September 1971. During this time, he flew 88 combat missions in various fighter and attack aircraft. The following September, he moved to Headquarters Pacific Air Forces at Hickam Air Force Base in Hawaii, as deputy chief of staff, plans and operations.

Marshall was promoted to the grade of lieutenant general effective September 1, 1974, with date of rank August 27, 1974. He was appointed vice commander in chief of the Pacific Air Forces, in September 1974. His final assignment was as Deputy Commander in Chief of U.S. Readiness Command at MacDill Air Force Base in Florida, from June 1975 until his retirement on September 1, 1977.

== Later life ==
Marshall died at Tripler Army Medical Center in Hawaii, on September 19, 2015. He was buried at Arlington National Cemetery.

== Awards and decorations ==
His military decorations and awards include the Air Force Distinguished Service Medal with oak leaf cluster; Silver Star; Legion of Merit with three oak leaf clusters; Distinguished Flying Cross with two oak leaf clusters; Bronze Star Medal; Air Medal with five oak leaf clusters; Purple Heart; from the Republic of Korea: the Order of Military Merit, Chungmu Medal with gold star and the Order of National Security Merit; and from the Republic of Vietnam: the National Order of Vietnam, 5th Class, and the Gallantry Cross with palm.

Command Pilot
Air Force Distinguished Service Medal with bronze oak leaf cluster		Silver Star
Legion of Merit with three bronze oak leaf clusters	Distinguished Flying Cross with two bronze oak leaf clusters	Bronze Star Medal
Purple Heart	Air Medal with silver oak leaf cluster	Air Force Presidential Unit Citation with bronze oak leaf cluster
American Campaign Medal	World War II Victory Medal	National Defense Service Medal with service star
Korean Service Medal with three bronze campaign stars	Vietnam Service Medal with three bronze campaign stars	Air Force Longevity Service Award with one silver and two bronze oak leaf clusters
Small Arms Expert Marksmanship Ribbon	South Korean Order of Military Merit; Chungmu Medal with gold star	South Korean Order of National Security Merit; Tongil Medal
National Order of Vietnam; Knight	Republic of Korea Presidential Unit Citation	Republic of Vietnam Gallantry Cross
United Nations Service Medal for Korea	Vietnam Campaign Medal	Korean War Service Medal

=== Silver Star citation ===
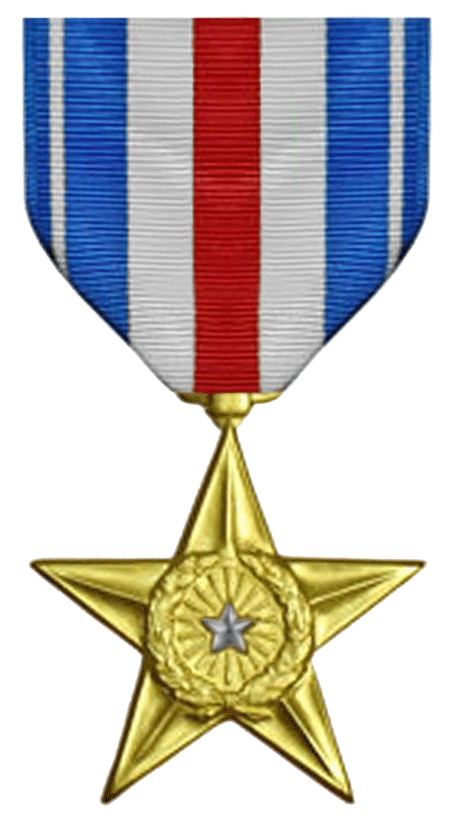

Marshall, Winton W.
Colonel, U.S. Air Force
335th Fighter-Interceptor Squadron, 4th Fighter-Interceptor Wing, Fifth Air Force
Date of Action: November 30, 1951

Citation:

The President of the United States of America, authorized by Act of Congress July 9, 1918, takes pleasure in presenting the Silver Star to Colonel Winton Whittier Marshall, United States Air Force, for gallantry in action in aerial combat over North Korea on 30 November 1951. While leading a squadron of twelve F-86 aircraft in the 335th Fighter-Interceptor Squadron, 4th Fighter-Interceptor Wing, Fifth Air Force, on a combat air patrol, he sighted nine TU-2 enemy bombers headed southward in the area of Namsi-Dong, North Korea, escorted by large numbers of fighter aircraft. Although realizing that the friendly forces were greatly outnumbered and were faced with intense and accurate cannon fire, Colonel Marshall displayed outstanding courage and tactical skill in leading his squadron in an immediate and aggressive attack on the enemy bombers. He coolly and skillfully deployed his forces to obtain the maximum tactical advantage and then led them in on the initial attack, during which he personally destroyed one TU-2 bomber. Expertly regrouping his force, he launched successive and continuing attacks affording the enemy no opportunity to reorganize. On the third pass, his F-86 sustained major damage from two direct hits by enemy cannon fire. One hit was in the leading edge of the left wing, the projectile exploding in the area of the fuel cell. The second projectile exploded against the head rest, destroying the canopy completely and badly damaging his parachute. He received numerous lacerations about the face, head, neck and back. Partially stunned from the force of the second explosion he recovered control of his aircraft but found himself separated from his flight. Although bleeding profusely and suffering from severe shock and exposure to sub-freezing temperatures and despite the sluggish reactions of his damaged aircraft, he rejoined his comrades in battle, against overwhelming odds. Totally disregarding his own safety, Colonel Marshall continued to carry the offensive, and largely through his own inspiring leadership and heroic personal example, the enemy formation was completely disrupted. When he has expended his ammunition and was low on fuel, he was forced to break off the attack and return to home base. Despite his wounds and the adverse flight conditions imposed by loss of his canopy, complicated further by the fact that he was without radio communication or radio compass as a result of battle damage, he managed to land his F-86 safely. At the time of this deed, Colonel Marshall had flown a total of 64 missions in the Korean campaign. The gallantry and selfless devotion to duty displayed by Colonel Marshall in this action of high personal courage reflected great credit upon himself, the Far East Air Forces, and the United States Air Force.
