= Markham Historic District =

Historic district in Virginia, United States

- U.S. National Register of Historic Places
- U.S. Historic district
- Virginia Landmarks Register
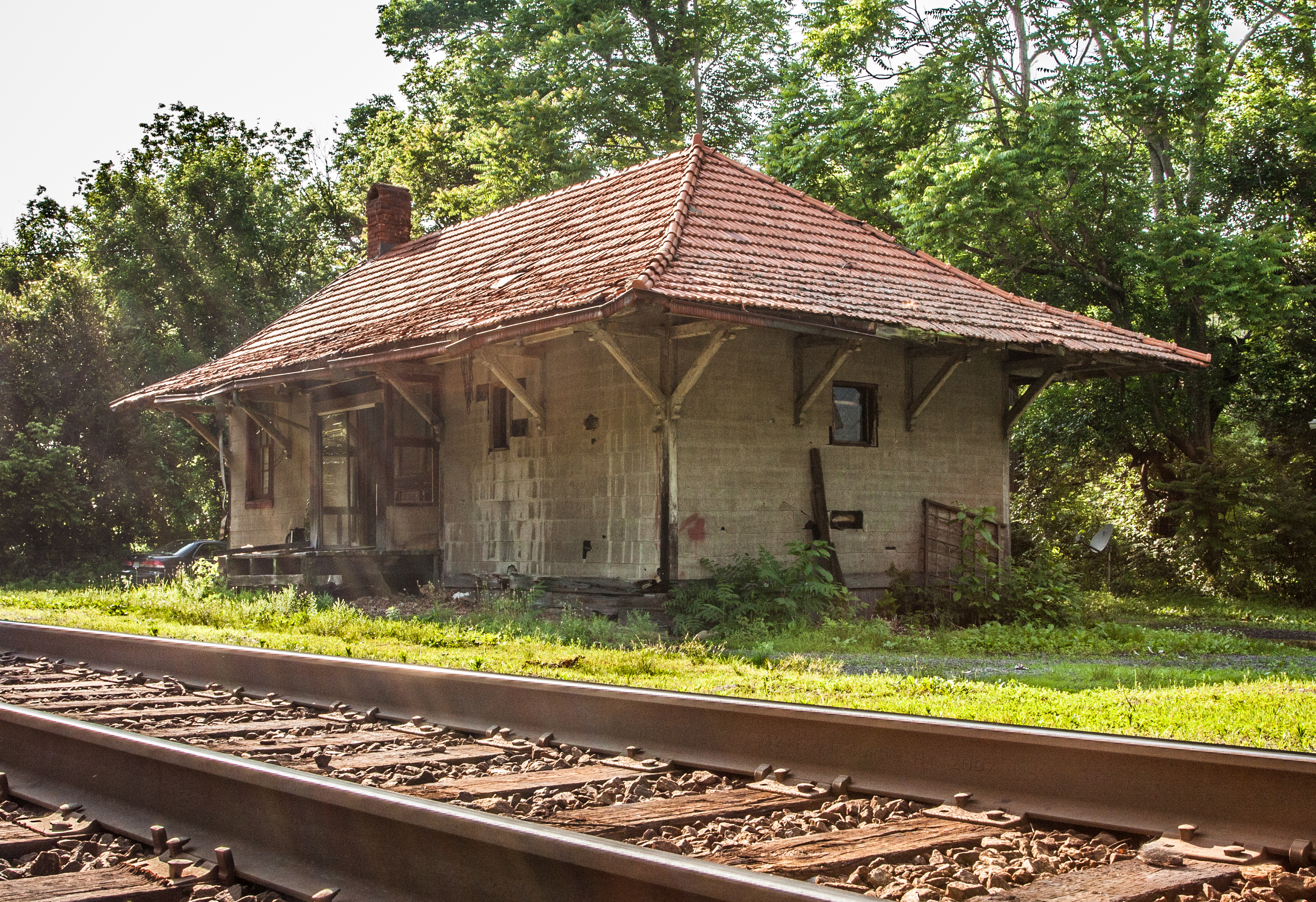
- Abandoned Rail Depot in Markham, Virginia

- Location within Northern Virginia Location within Virginia Location within the United States
- Location: Pts of E. John Marshall Hwy, Farm House Rd., Leeds Manor Rd., Old Markham Rd. Poverty Hollow Ln, Rail Stop Rd. etc., Markham, Virginia
- Coordinates: 38°54′21″N 77°59′52″W
- Area: less than one acre
- Built: 1811
- Architectural style: Greek Revival, et al.
- NRHP reference No.: 05001261
- VLR No.: 030-5157

Significant dates
- Added to NRHP: November 17, 2005
- Designated VLR: September 14, 2005

Markham Historic District is a national historic district located at Markham, Fauquier County, Virginia. It encompasses 44 contributing buildings and 4 contributing sites in the rural villages of Farrowsville and Markham. The majority of resources in the district were constructed in the mid- and late 19th century and include multiple dwellings, a hotel, as well as commercial buildings, and a train station. The district also contains early-20th-century dwellings. Notable buildings include Mountain View (c. 1811), Wolf's Crag (c. 1820), Rosebank (c. 1870), Markham School (1918), the 1819 stone Upper Goose Creek Church, and the former Markham Freight Station (c. 1900).

It was listed on the National Register of Historic Places in 2005.

== Gallery ==
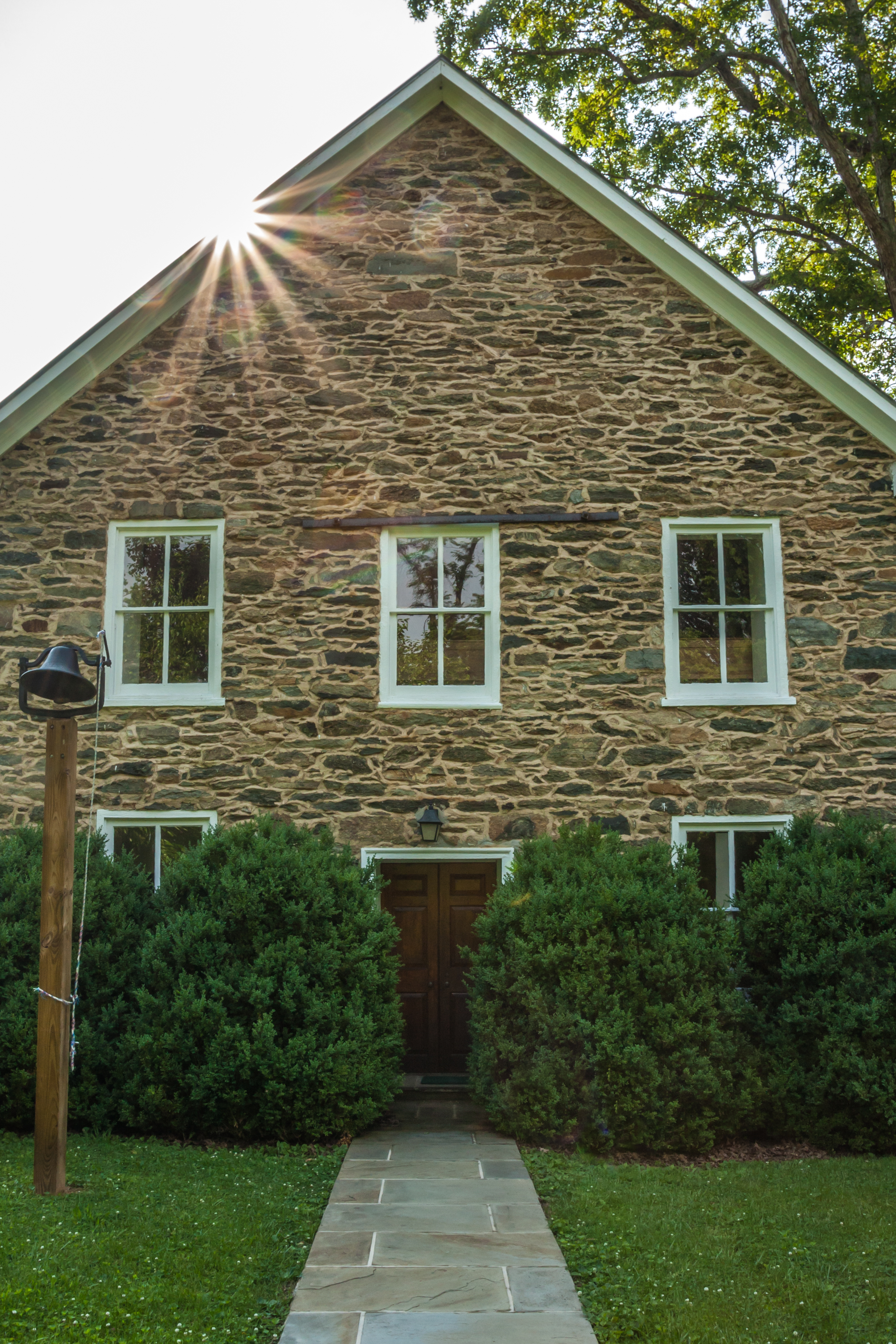
Upper Goose Creek Stone Church

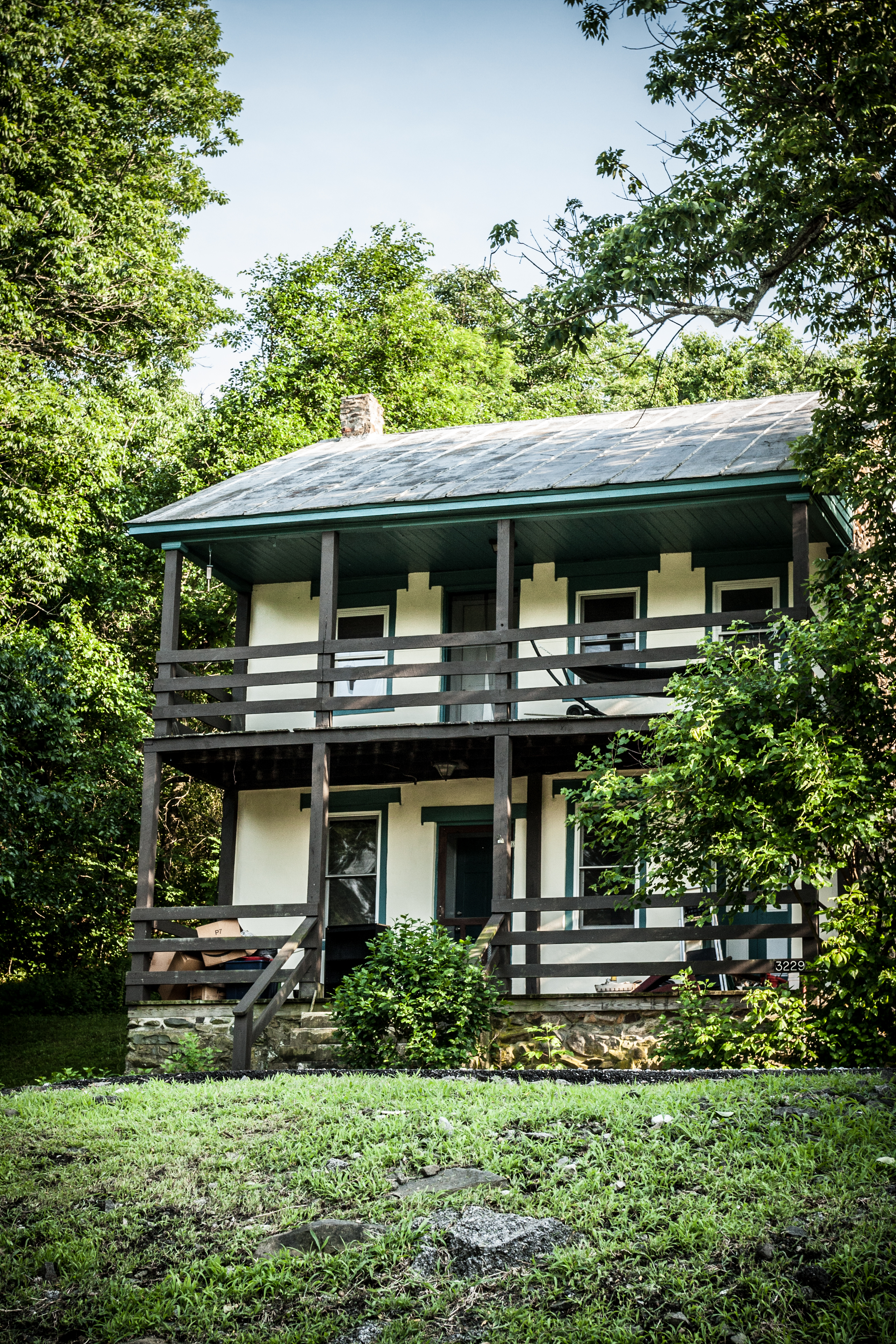
Residence

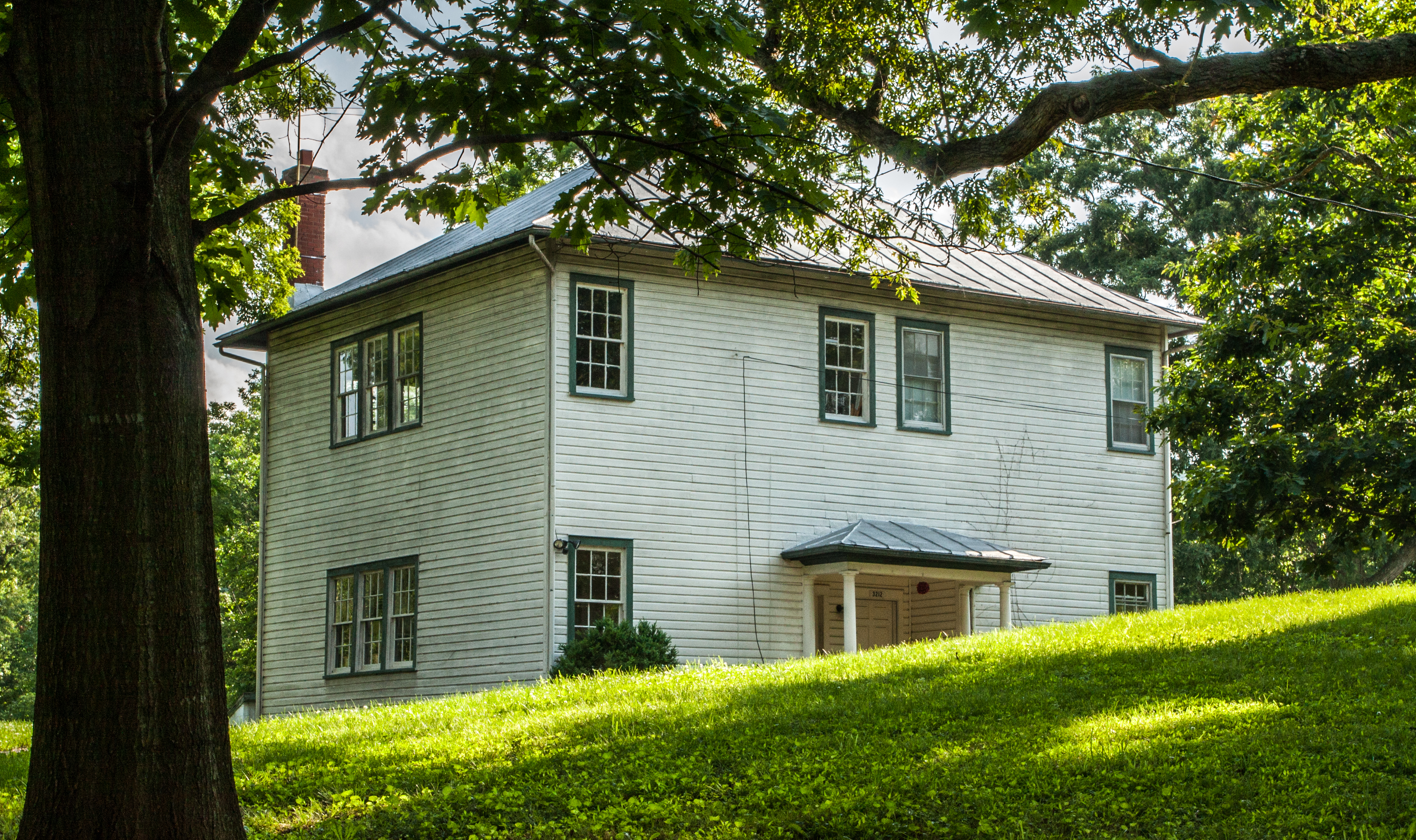
Markham School

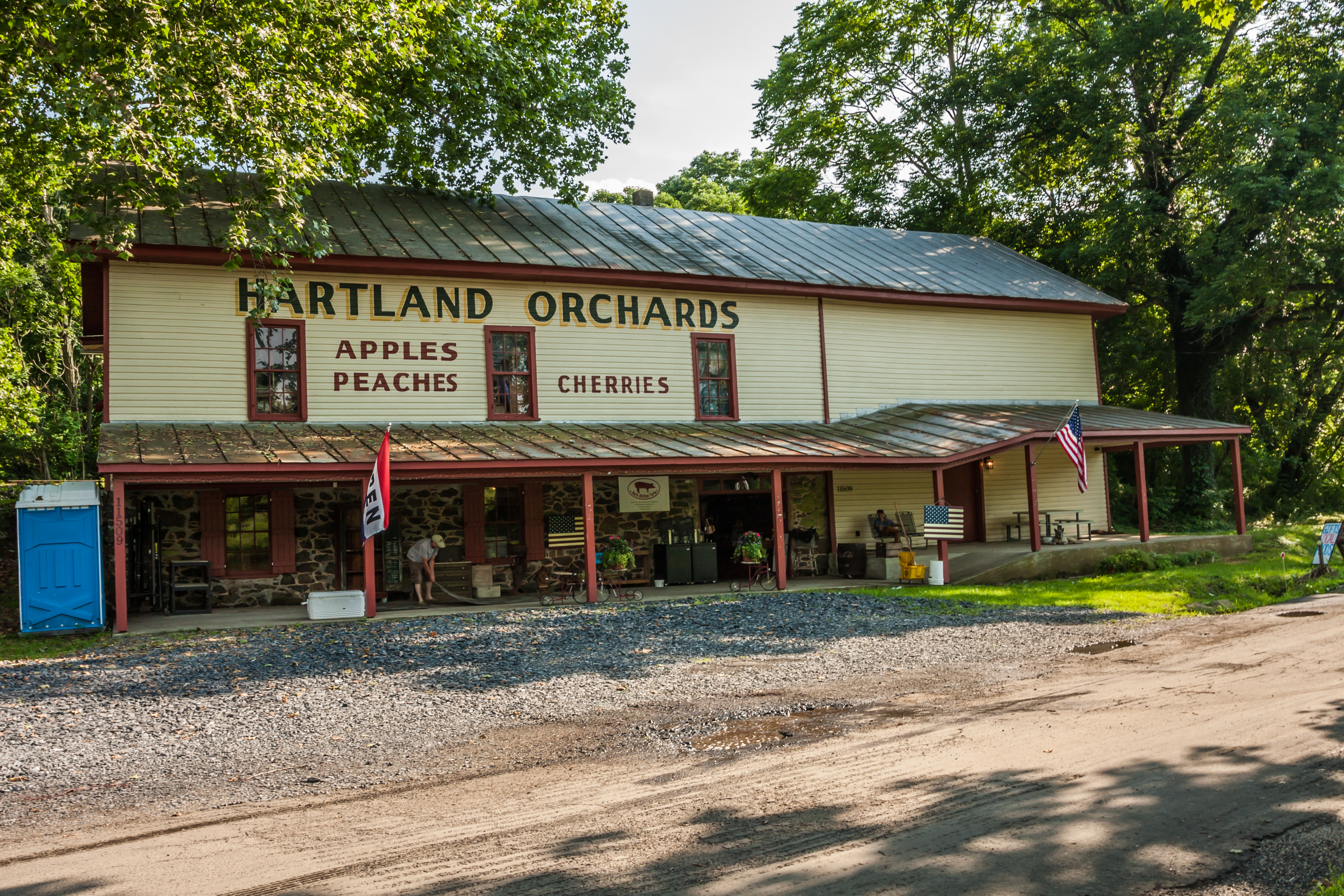
Warehouse/Store

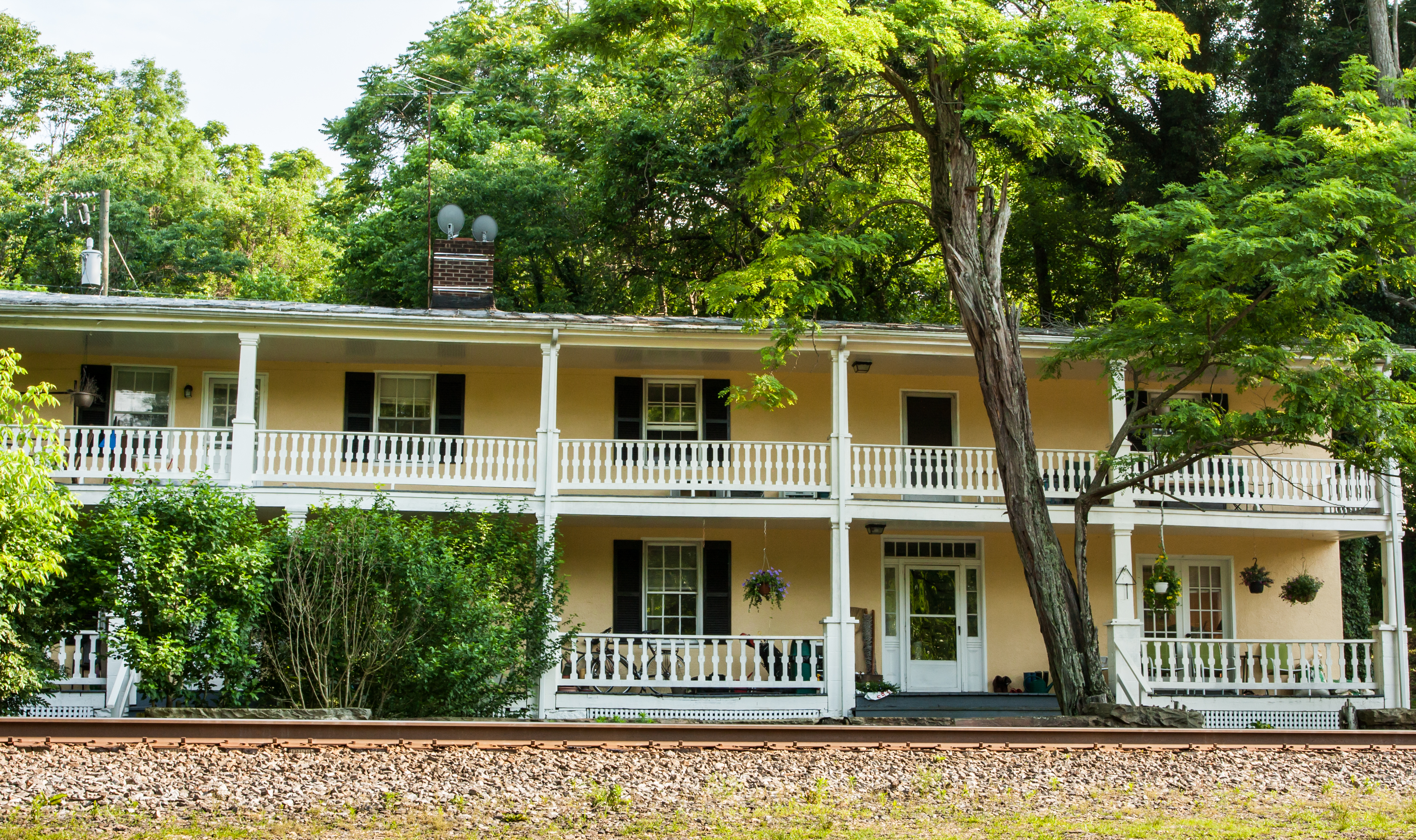
Two-story Hotel

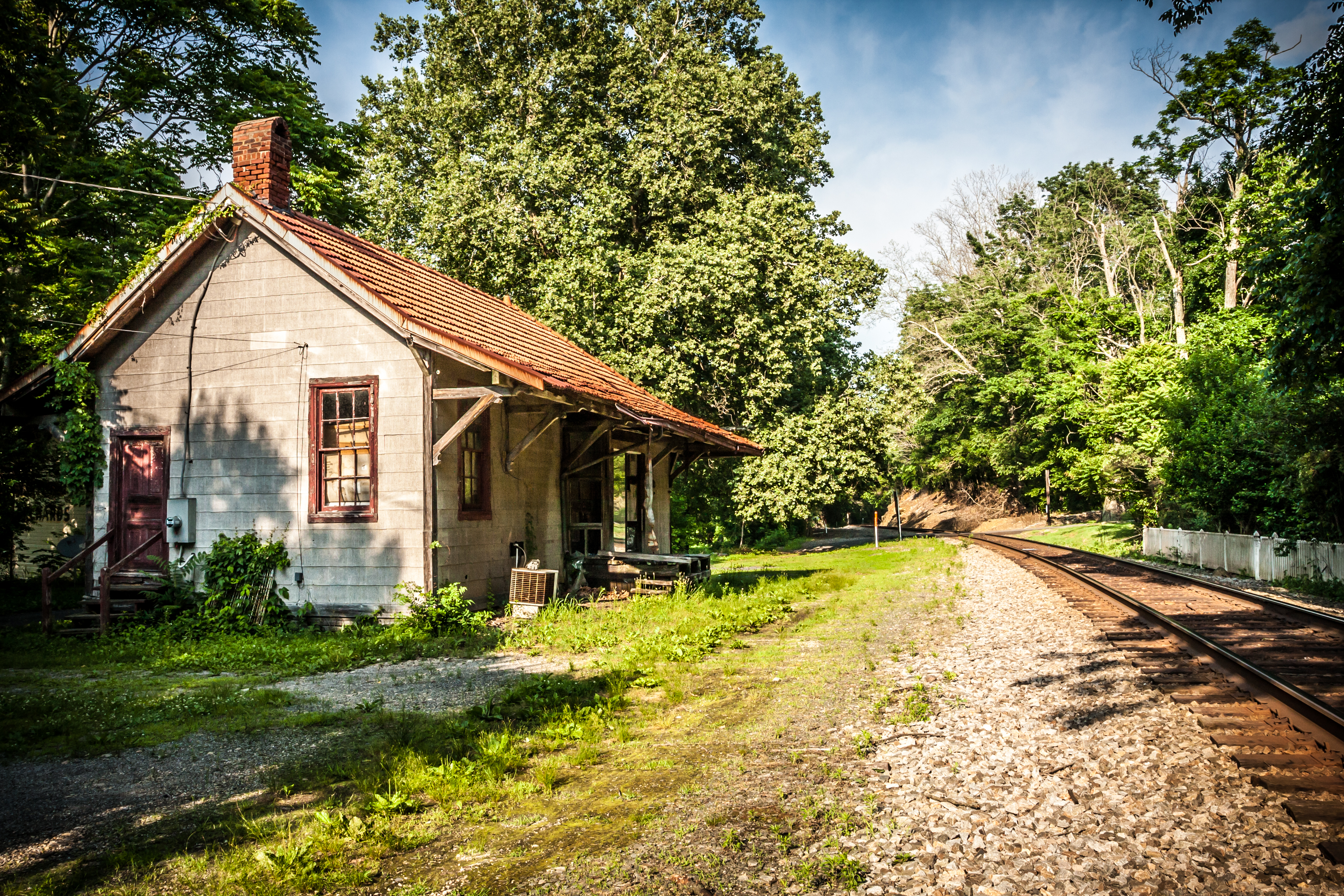
Rail depot, looking east
