= Don't Be Such a Scientist =

2009 book by Randy Olson

Don't Be Such A Scientist: Talking Substance in an Age of Style
- Author: Randy Olson
- Language: English
- Genre: Science, Communication
- Publisher: Island Press
- Publication date: September 28, 2009
- Publication place: United States
- Media type: Print (Paperback)
- Pages: 256 p. 6x9
- ISBN: 978-1-59726-563-8
- OCLC: 286479843
- Dewey Decimal: 501.4 22
- LC Class: Q223 .O47 2009

Don't Be Such A Scientist: Talking Substance in an Age of Style is a book published by Island Press written by scientist-turned-filmmaker Randy Olson which arises from a talk of the same title Olson gave to science audiences at universities and museums for five years preceding its publication. The focus of the book is the challenge scientists face in communicating to the general public in an age of information-overload. Olson draws on his two careers, first as a marine biologist who achieved a tenured professorship, then his second career which began when he then resigned to attend film school and acting classes, eventually becoming an independent feature filmmaker. Among other topics, the book addresses the role of spontaneity, storytelling, and likeability in the mass communication of science.

== Reviews ==
- Science News
- Discover Magazine
- NPR
