= John E. Olson =

John Eric Olson
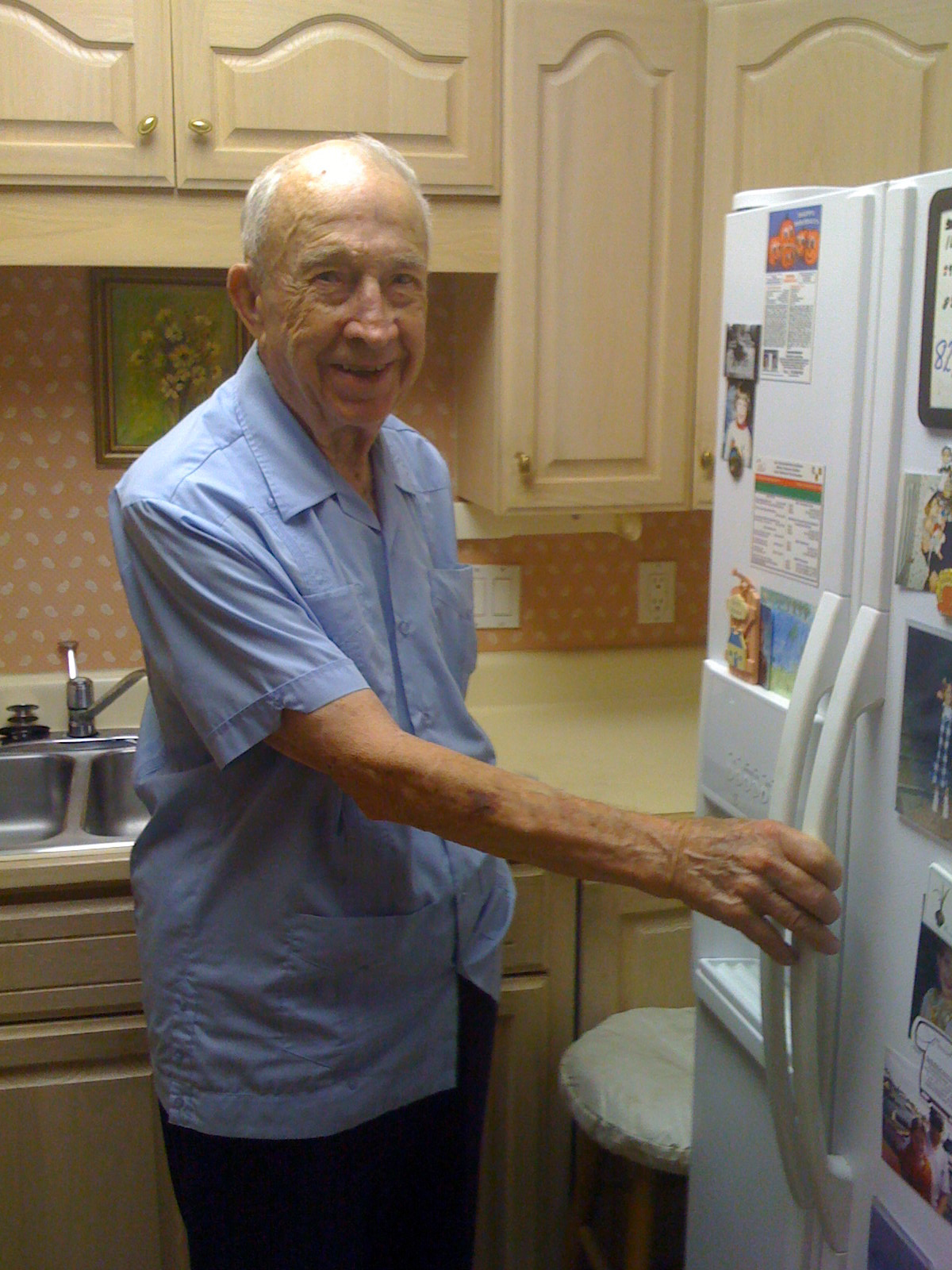
- Olson at home near San Antonio, Texas in 2009
- Born: November 27, 1917; Fort Leavenworth, Kansas
- Died: October 2, 2012 (aged 94) Kansas City, Kansas
- Allegiance: United States of America
- Branch: United States Army
- Service years: 1939–1967
- Conflicts: World War II; Vietnam War
- Awards: Silver Star; Bronze Star Medal; Order of Merit; Army Commendation Medal with one Oak Leaf Cluster

John Eric Olson (November 27, 1917 – October 2, 2012) was a U.S. Army Colonel, West Point graduate (class of 1939), and one of the last surviving officers of the Bataan Death March of World War II. He was also a military historian and author of three books, as well as numerous magazine articles dealing primarily with his experiences as a prisoner of war in the Philippines and in Japan from 1942 to 1945.

== Early life ==
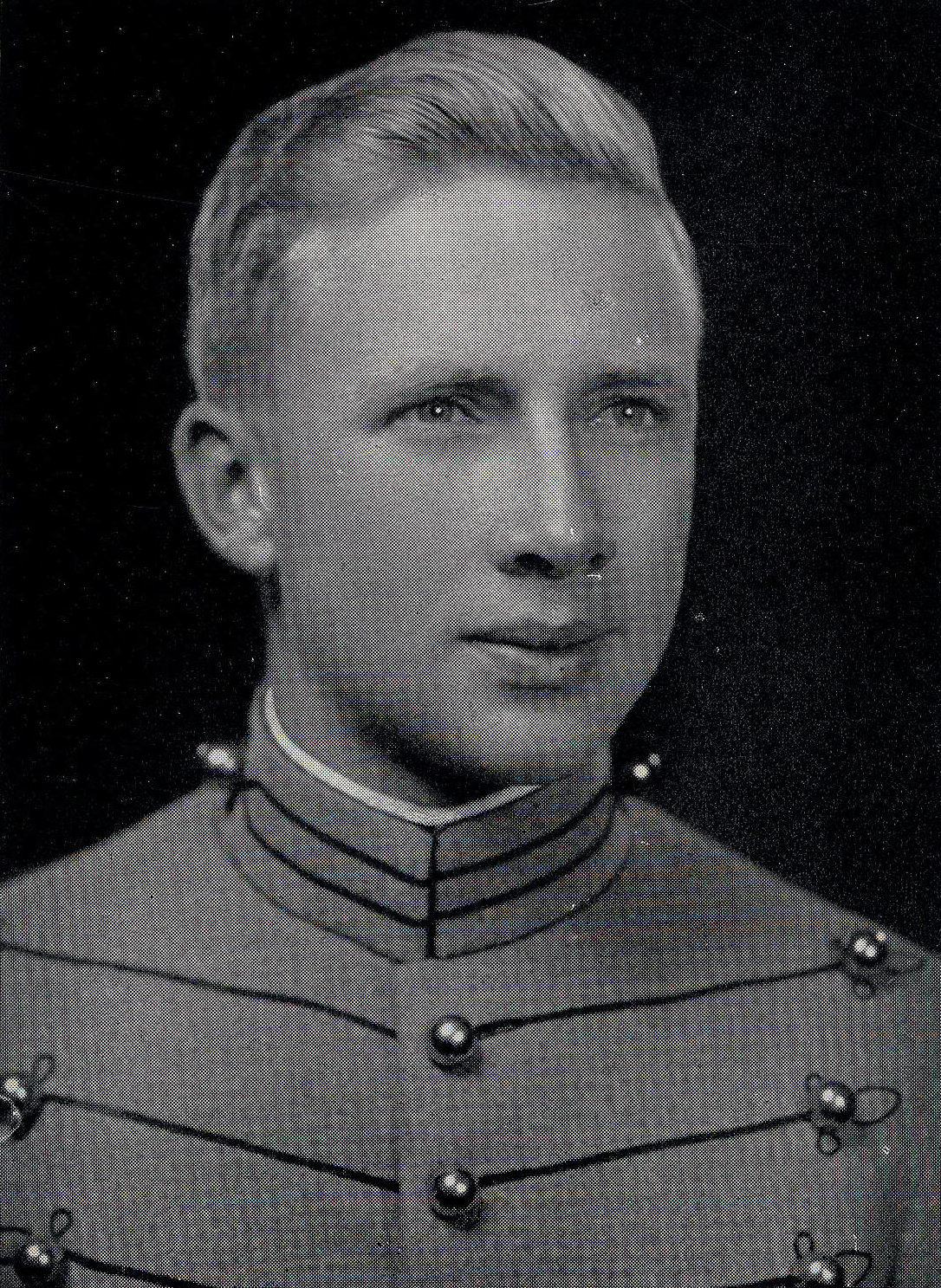
Olson as a West Point cadet c. 1939

Olson was born at Fort Leavenworth, Kansas, on November 27, 1917, the only son of Hans Oscar and Clara (Nee Carr) Olson. He grew up primarily in Holly Springs, Mississippi. After graduating from high school, he attended Marion Military Academy (Alabama) for a year before earning a Congressional appointment to West Point. Upon graduation in 1939 he was deployed to Fort William McKinley in the Philippines as a Second Lieutenant.

== World War II ==
As the Japanese invasion of the Philippines began in 1941, Olson was assigned to the 57th Infantry Regiment of the Philippine Scouts on the Bataan Peninsula. The U.S. forces in the Philippines were ordered to surrender to the Japanese in April, 1942. Olson was captured and joined more than 9600 U.S. soldiers and nearly 50,000 Filipinos who made up what came to be known as the Bataan Death March. He was first imprisoned at Camp O'Donnell prison where he was appointed Assistant to the Adjutant, keeping secret records for the prison. Before being transferred to Cabanatuan prison, in June, 1942, he managed to bury all his reports in the nearby jungle. In 1948 he returned, exhumed those records, and nearly four decades later used them to write his history of the camp.

Shortly before leaving Camp O'Donnell, he and another prisoner were given a sack of cement and ordered to create a monument to the soldiers who died on the Bataan Peninsula. Before starting to work, he was ordered elsewhere. But years later, while conducting research on the war, Olson came across a photo of General Douglas MacArthur pointing to a small cross in the brush. It turned out to be the work of the other soldier, whose name Olson cannot recall. Thirty years later Olson headed up an effort that managed to raise enough funds to bring the cross to the U.S. where it is now on display at the National Prisoner of War Museum, Andersonville, Georgia.

After transport to Japan in November 1942, Olson was imprisoned at the Osaka Seiko Company steel mill in Osaka, Japan where he spent the remainder of the war in forced labor, until being moved to Oeyama before the onset of U.S. bombing raids. Liberated in September, 1945, he traveled to Kyoto, Japan where he stayed at the Miyako Hotel, overlooking the city, and was given the Emperor's Penthouse Suite, which he wrote about in an article published in the October 1983 issue of The Retired Officer, "I Slept in the Emperor's Bed."

== Post-War experience ==
Back in the United States, Olson married Harriette Marshall (daughter of Major General Richard J. Marshall, a member of Douglas MacArthur's staff on Corregidor Island). The two had met en route to the Philippines just before the war. The Olsons had five children, including scientist-turned-filmmaker Randy Olson. Col. Olson served as J-3 advisor in the early 1960s in Vietnam. He retired as a full colonel in 1967. He later became Vice President of Black and Veatch Consulting Engineers as Director of International Marketing.

After his second retirement, he set to work fulfilling the vow he had made after World War II to eventually write a book about his Camp O'Donnell experiences. In 1985 he self-published his first book, "O'Donnell: Andersonville of the Pacific", in which he drew parallels between Camp O'Donnell and the Civil War Confederate prison, Andersonville—the two prisons represent the two highest levels of mortality in history for U.S. POW's. In both cases, the cause of the high mortality was primarily disease due to unsanitary conditions brought on by overcrowding and poor administration.

In the following years he published three more books, wrote numerous articles, and became a popular authority on the history of the Philippine Scouts. On May 24, 2008 he was awarded the Lifetime Achievement Award from the Philippine Scouts Heritage Society. His military awards include, among others, the Silver Star, the Bronze Star Medal, the Order of Merit, and the Army Commendation Medal with one Oak Leaf Cluster.

== Publications ==
- 1985: O'Donnell, Andersonville of the Pacific, ISBN 978-9996986208
- 1994: The Guerrilla and the Hostage, ISBN 978-0964443204
