= Markham, Fauquier County, Virginia =

Unincorporated community in Virginia, United States

Markham, Virginia
- Unincorporated community
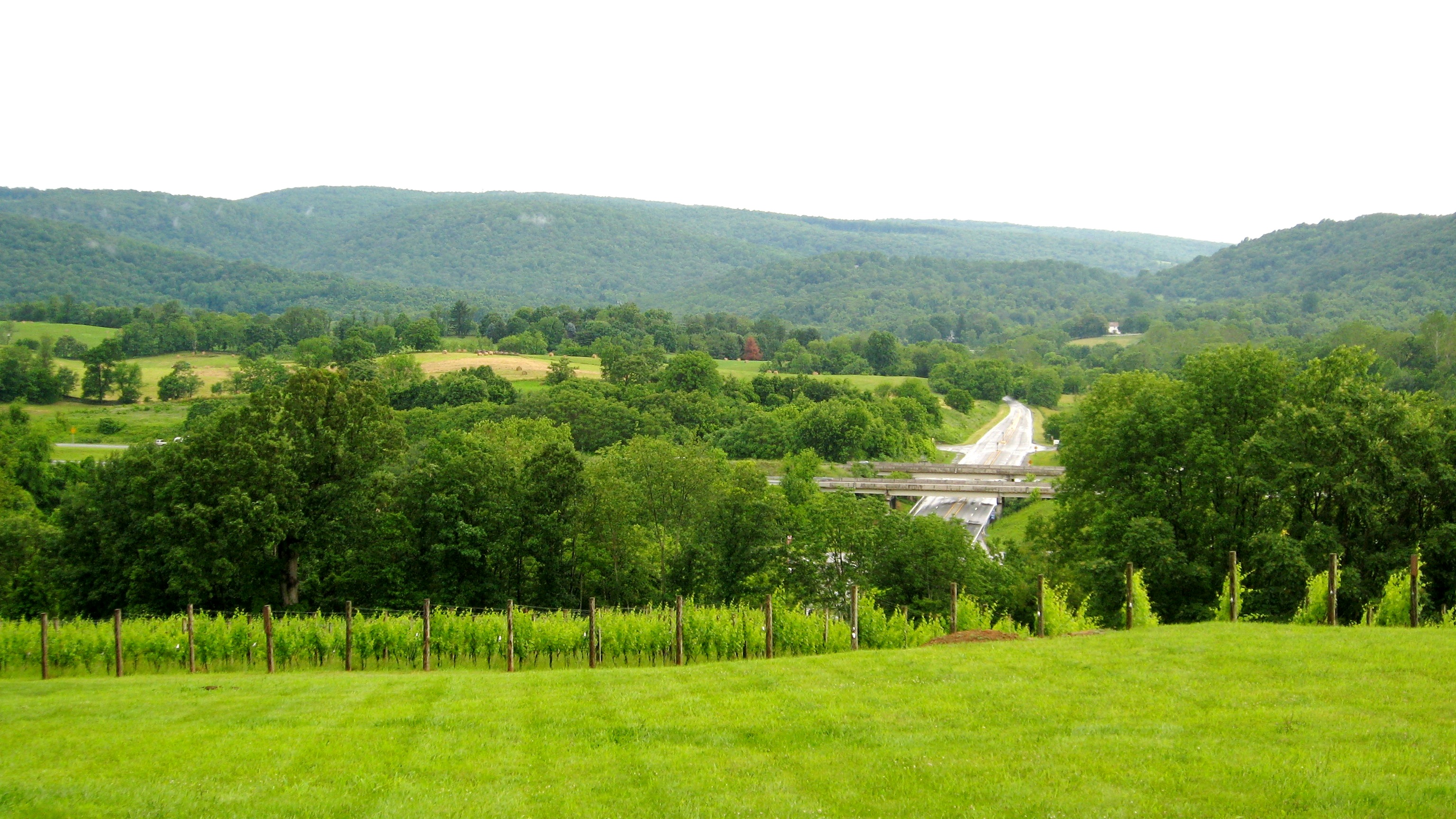
- Countryside in Markham

- Location within the Commonwealth of Virginia Markham (Virginia) Markham (the United States)
- Coordinates: 38°54′14″N 78°00′07″W
- Country: United States
- State: Virginia
- County: Fauquier
- Time zone: UTC−5 (Eastern (EST))
  - Summer (DST): UTC−4 (EDT)
- ZIP codes: 22643
- GNIS feature ID: 1495900

Markham is a small unincorporated village in Fauquier County, Virginia, United States, along State Route 55 and off Interstate 66. It is home to Naked Mountain Vineyard, its own post office, and the ZIP Code of 22643. The former Manassas Gap Railway (now Norfolk Southern B-Line) runs through the community.

The John Marshall's Leeds Manor Rural Historic District, Markham Historic District, The Hollow, and Morven are listed on the National Register of Historic Places.

== Notable people ==
- James Markham Ambler, American naval surgeon
- Richard H. Jeschke, Brigadier General in the Marine Corps; died in Markham
- Richard Marshall, born in Markham; Major General in the United States Army during World War II
- St. Julien R. Marshall, born in Markham; Brigadier general in the Marine Corps; brother of Richard Marshall
