= Attorney General Marshall =

Attorney General Marshall may refer to

- Dale Marshall (politician) (born 1963), Attorney General of Barbados
- Edward C. Marshall (1821–1893), Attorney General of California
- Jack Marshall (1912–1988), Attorney General of New Zealand
- Steve Marshall (politician) (born 1964), Attorney General of Alabama

== See also ==
- General Marshall (disambiguation)
