= Flock of Dodos =

Flock of Dodos: The Evolution-Intelligent Design Circus
- Directed by: Randy Olson
- Written by: Randy Olson
- Produced by: Ty Carlisle
- Music by: Amotz Plessner
- Distributed by: New Video (US Home Video), Documentary Educational Resources (International)
- Release date: 2006
- Running time: 84 minutes
- Country: United States
- Language: English

Flock of Dodos: The Evolution-Intelligent Design Circus is a documentary film by American marine biologist and filmmaker Randy Olson. It highlights the debate between proponents of the concept of intelligent design and the scientific evidence and consensus that supports evolution, as well as the potential consequences of science rejection.

The documentary was first screened publicly on February 2, 2006, in Kansas, where much of the public controversy on intelligent design began, as well as the starting point of discussion in the documentary. Other public screenings followed in universities, including Harvard and Stony Brook University, marking the celebration of Charles Darwin's birthday.

== Synopsis ==
Flock of Dodos examines the disagreements that proponents of intelligent design have with the scientific consensus position of evolution. Olsen also expressed concerns in relation to the potential to distrust and reject science in general.

The evolutionarily famous dodo (Raphus cucullatus) is a now-extinct bird that lived on the island of Mauritius. Due to its lack of fear of humans and inability to fly, the dodo was easy prey, and thus became known for its apparent stupidity.

The film attempts to determine who the real "dodos" are in a constantly evolving world: the scientists who are failing to effectively promote evolution as a scientifically accepted fact, the intelligent design advocates, or the American public who get fooled by the "salesmanship" of evolution critics. The film gives equal air time to both sides of the argument, including intelligent design proponent Michael Behe and several of his colleagues.

While Randy Olson ultimately sides with the scientists who accept evolution, the scientists are criticized for their elitism and inability to efficiently present science to the general public, which ultimately contributes to the spread of misconceptions.

The film begins by going over the history of intelligent design thought from Plato and Paley to the present-day incarnation promoted by the Discovery Institute. Olson mixes in humorous cartoons of squawking dodos with commentary from his mother and interviews with proponents on both sides of the intelligent design/evolution debate.

On the intelligent design side, Olson interviews Behe, John Calvart (founder of the Access Research Network) and a member of the Kansas school board. Olson also unsuccessfully tries to interview Kansas Board of Education member Connie Morris (associated with Kansas evolution hearings) and members of the Discovery Institute.

== Release ==
The documentary premiered at the Tribeca Film Festival in New York, in April 2006, and since then has played at film festivals all over the U.S. and abroad. The documentary was shown in museums and universities as part of a "Dodos Darwin Day" event (celebrating Charles Darwin's birthday) on or around February 12, 2007. Flock of Dodos: the Evolution-Intelligent Design Circus is currently (as of January 2008) in rotation on Showtime in the US and available on DVD.

The documentary was praised by the journal Nature and a variety of other publications.

In 2007, Olson released a collection of "pulled punches," of unreleased material that he chose to leave out that reflected poorly on intelligent design supporters.

== Discovery Institute response ==
Olson invited the Discovery Institute, a hub of the intelligent design movement, to appear in the film. Instead the institute responded by creating a website, Hoax of Dodos, characterizing the documentary as "revisionist history," and a "hoax" filled with inaccuracies and misrepresentations.

Biologist PZ Myers responded to the institute's "bogus complaint that Olson was lying in the movie" about Ernst Haeckel's drawings of embryos is false. Myers explained the drawings have not been used in recent biology textbooks "other than a mention that once upon a time Haeckel came up with this idea of ontogeny recapitulating phylogeny." Myers and other critics of intelligent design have shown that each of these texts treats Haeckel's theory of ontogeny recapitulating phylogeny as an example of an outdated exaggeration. Myers notes in his rebuttal of the criticism from design proponents that, "I would add that progress in evolutionary biology has led to better explanations of the phenomenon that vertebrate embryos go through a period of similarity: it lies in conserved genetic circuitry that lays down the body plan."

In early 2007, in response to Olson's claim, "the Discovery Institute is truly the big fish in this picture, with an annual budget of around $5 million," the Institute responded that their budget is only $4.2 million, and that they spend close to $1 million per year funding intelligent design.
