= Brian Palermo =

American character actor, science communicator, and comedian

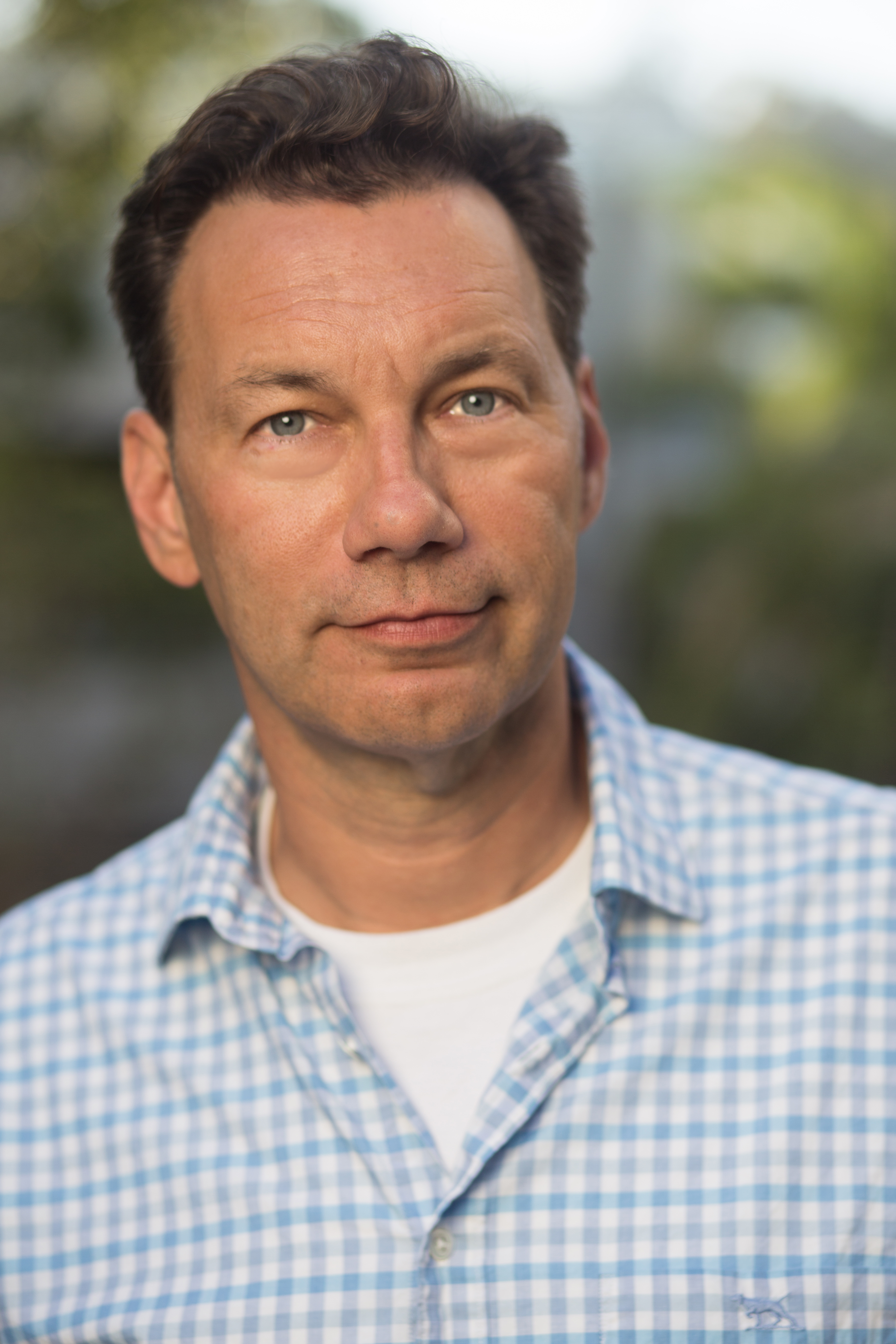
- Palermo in 2019
- Born: Brian Joseph Palermo
- Occupations: Actor, comedian, science communicator, improv instructor
- Years active: 1994–present
- Website: palermoimprovtraining.com

Brian Palermo is an American character actor, science communicator, improv instructor and comedian. He has appeared in a number of television shows, commercials and movies. Palermo is also a writer whose credits include Warner Brothers' Histeria! and Disney's The Weekenders and Dave The Barbarian, both created by Doug Langdale. He is also a co-author with Randy Olson and Dorie Barton of the 2003 book, Connection: Hollywood Storytelling Meets Critical Thinking.

== Career ==
His film credits include The Social Network, My Life In Ruins, Daddy Day Care and Big Momma's House among others. Television credits include Entourage, Friends, Gary Unmarried, 90210, Zeke and Luther, The Middle, State of Georgia, Will and Grace, Digimon Data Squad, Malcolm In The Middle, Henry Danger, and Danger Force.

Palermo has appeared numerous times on The Tonight Show with Jay Leno, though in April 2011 he started doing "correspondent" pieces where he played "The Humanalyzer," pretending he can analyze dreams to prove how gullible people are. These are introduced live by Palermo and Jay Leno. Palermo has also appeared as a recurring character on Tyler Perry's House of Payne as Phil who adopts a fake French accent and persona as "Phillipe."

Palermo is a member of the improvisational and sketch comedy group called "The Groundlings," based in Hollywood, California. He both performs and teaches with this company. He has performed alongside many well-known comedians such as Will Ferrell, Eddie Izzard and Harland Williams.

Palermo won the 1988 "Big Easy" award for Best Actor for his role as "Teach" in David Mamet's American Buffalo.

Palermo appeared on the podcast Skepticality, where he spoke to host Derek Colanduno about teaching improv for 15 years at The Groundlings. He came to use improv to help scientists improve their communication skills thanks to Randy Olson. He states: "The idea is to get people's attention with the emotional stuff first, then hit them with the substance." He got a series of small parts in cinema, played a computer science professor in the movie The Social Network, he also had a part in Thank You for Smoking and others. "The book brings a very cerebral subject down to a level that almost everybody can understand."

Palermo ran a hands-on workshop at the Ocean Sciences Meeting in February 2020 on "How to Make Your Science Communication More Effective."

His Palermo Improv Training project is a consultancy whose goal is to facilitate improv training for various applications within the worlds of corporate, science communication and improv comedy. According to Palermo, "An alarmingly large number of the world's population are misinformed and uninterested in scientific issues that have incredible impacts on all of our lives. And part of correcting this situation must be improving our science communications with people at every level of our societies. But most scientists get precious little communications training." His clients include Jet Propulsion Laboratory, National Park Service, and the USDA.

In 2003, Palermo, along with Randy Olson and Dorie Barton, published Connection: Hollywood Storytelling Meets Critical Thinking. The book brings together a former scientist (Olson), a story consultant (Barton), and an improv actor (Palermo) to explain how critical thinking in science combined with a century of Hollywood knowledge is used in the creation and shaping of stories. It also provides the narrative tools for effective communication.

== Bibliography ==
- Palermo, Brian (2003). Connection: Hollywood Storytelling Meets Critical Thinking. Australia: Prairie Starfish Productions. ISBN 978-0615872384.

== Filmography ==
=== Film ===
| Year | Title | Role | Notes |
|---|---|---|---|
| 1994 | Hollywood Dreams | Larry | |
| 1995 | Hollywood Dreams: Take 2 | Larry | |
| 1996 | Love Me Twice | Matt | |
| 1999 | The Thirteenth Year | Starter #1 | TV film |
| 2000 | In God We Trust | Radio DJ | Short film |
| 2000 | Big Brother Trouble | Coffee House Manager | |
| 2000 | Big Momma's House | Cazwell | |
| 2003 | Welcome to the Neighbourhood | Bruce | |
| 2003 | Daddy Day Care | Skeptical Father | |
| 2003 | Dinner with Fival | Brad Norton | Short film |
| 2004 | Who Dead It? | Mayor Jeffery Chancer | Direct-to-video |
| 2005 | Kicking & Screaming | Beantown Customer | |
| 2005 | Rebound | Alumni Association Member #1 | |
| 2005 | Dinner Conversation | Stephen | Short film |
| 2005 | Thank You for Smoking | FBI Agent | |
| 2005 | I'm Not Gay | Alex | Short film |
| 2006 | You Did What? | Andy Pztarski | |
| 2006 | Soup of the Day | Todd | |
| 2006 | The Enigma with a Stigma | Finnius J. Whippie | |
| 2007 | Women on Top | Kyle Rancor | |
| 2007 | Jekyll | John | |
| 2007 | Hell on Earth | Luc | TV film |
| 2009 | Shrink | Mitch | |
| 2009 | My Life in Ruins | Marc | |
| 2009 | Arrow Heads | Schoolboy | Short film |
| 2010 | Fudgy Wudgy Fudge Face | Dr. Cinnamon Eyes | |
| 2010 | Gaysharktank.com | | Short film |
| 2010 | The Social Network | CS Lab Professor | |
| 2010 | Love Shack | Ted Haynes | Direct-to-video |
| 2011 | Judy Moody and the Not Bummer Summer | Zombie | |
| 2011 | Answers to Nothing | Bill | |
| 2011 | One Sharp Girl | Mr. Sharp | TV film |
| 2011 | Let Go | Dress Salesman | |
| 2012 | Girl vs. Monster | Steve Lewis | TV film |
| 2012 | Shmagreggie Saves the World | Jim | TV film |
| 2013 | Breaking Belding | Mr. Belding/Walter White | Short film |
| 2016 | Pee-wee's Big Holiday | Marvin | |
| 2017 | Tangoborn Menclenty | Publisher | |
| 2017 | Almost Vegas | Gary Smith | TV film |
| 2018 | Vicarious | Kyle | TV film |
| 2018 | The Happytime Murders | Paramedic | |
| 2020 | The Pack Podcast | Payne | Short film |

=== Television ===
| Year | Title | Role | Notes |
|---|---|---|---|
| 1997 | Animal Tales | Clark | |
| 1998 | Suddenly Susan | Larry the Paramedic | Episode: "Ready...Aim...Fong!" |
| 1998 | Baywatch | Carl | Episode: "To the Max" |
| 1998 | Damon | D.E.A. Man | Episode: "Under Covers" |
| 1998 | The Closer | Russ | Episode: "My Best Friend's Funeral" |
| 1998 | The Hughleys | White Guy #1 | Episode: "Pilot" |
| 1998 | The Secret Lives of Men | Patient | Episode: "Phil's Problem" |
| 1998 | The Secret Lives of Men | Man in Clinic | Episode: "The Bird" |
| 1998-2010 | The Tonight Show with Jay Leno | Various roles | Recurring, 9 episodes |
| 1999 | Veronica's Closet | Usher | Episode: "Veronica's Night at the Theater" |
| 1999 | Will & Grace | Brian Kelly | Episode: "To Serve and Disinfect" |
| 1999-2002 | Family Law | Neil Sefton | Recurring role, 3 episodes |
| 2000 | Curb Your Enthusiasm | Brian | Episode: "Porno Gil" |
| 2000 | 3rd Rock from the Sun | Steve | Episode: "Dick Solomon's Day Off" |
| 2000 | 3rd Rock from the Sun | Mr. Barnes | Episode: "Red, White & Dick" |
| 2001 | Jack & Jill | Wedding Guest | Episode: "What Weddings Do to People" |
| 2001 | Three Sisters | Customer | Episode: "The Dry Spell" |
| 2001 | For Your Love | | Episode: "The Rules of Engagement" |
| 2001 | JAG | Motorist | Episode: "Adrift" |
| 2002 | That '80s Show | Kenmore | Recurring role, 3 episodes |
| 2002 | According to Jim | Bartender | Episode: "No Surprises" |
| 2002 | Crossing Jordan | Lewis Pate | Episode: "The Truth Is Out There" |
| 2003 | Good Morning, Miami | Trip | Episode: "The Ex Games" |
| 2003 | Grounded for Life | Jeff | Episode: "Ticket to Ride" |
| 2004 | I'm with Her | Clerk | Episode: "Party of Two" |
| 2004 | Friends | Another Passenger | Episode: "The Last One" |
| 2004 | One on One | Mr. Evans | Episode: "Lost in the Headlights" |
| 2004 | Significant Others | James | Series regular, 12 episodes |
| 2004-2012 | Bleach | Kaname Tōsen | |
| 2005 | Huff | Doug Coleman | Episode: "Christmas Is Ruined" |
| 2005 | Everwood | Rick | Episode: "A Mountain Town" |
| 2006 | Monk | Shirt Salesman | Episode: "Mr. Monk Goes to a Fashion Show" |
| 2006 | Malcolm in the Middle | Steve | Episode: "Mono" |
| 2006 | The Unit | National Guard Commander | Episode: "First Responders" |
| 2006 | Sons & Daughters | Colleen's Doctor | Episode: "Hospital Visit" |
| 2006 | Lovespring International | Client's Boyfriend | Episode: "Burke Makes a Friend" |
| 2006 | Kekkaishi | Toshihiko Tsukijigaoka | Episode: "The Best Cake in the World" |
| 2006 | Big Day | Jean-Pierre | Episode: "Alice Can't Dance" |
| 2006-2008 | Digimon Data Squad | Akihiro Kurata | Series regular, 18 episodes |
| 2007 | Entourage | Real Estate Agent | Episode: "Adios, Amigos" |
| 2008 | Hollywood Residential | Todd | Episode: "Where's Tom?" |
| 2008 | Gary Unmarried | Jim | Episode: "Gary and Allison Brooks" |
| 2008 | Heroes | Rental Car Agent | Episode: "The Eclipse: Part 1" |
| 2009 | Trust Me | Richard Donarelli | Episode: "Au Courant" |
| 2009 | Psych: Flashback to the Teen Years | Job Fair Guy | Episode: "Job Un-Fair" |
| 2009-2011 | In Gayle We Trust | Mike Evans | Series regular, 8 episodes |
| 2010 | Tyler Perry's House of Payne | Phillipe | Recurring role, 3 episodes |
| 2010 | Warren the Ape | MTV Exec #1 | Episode: "Bad Po-Fo" |
| 2011 | 90210 | Giles Scott | Episodes: "Revenge with the Nerd" & "It's High Time" |
| 2011 | The Middle | Phil Bickel | Episode: "Royal Wedding" |
| 2011 | Svetlana | Lee Ashton | Episode: "Season 2, Episode 4" |
| 2011 | State of Georgia | Brady | Episode: "Best Friends For-Never" |
| 2011 | Love Bites | Rick Rondo | Episode: "Boys to Men" |
| 2011 | Good Luck Charlie | Danny Flufferman | Episode: "Return to Super Adventure Land" |
| 2011-2012 | Fresh Hell | Tommy | Series regular, 9 episodes |
| 2012 | Zeke and Luther | | Episode: "Inside Luther's Brain" |
| 2013 | 2 Broke Girls | Pilot Bill | Episode: "And Just Plane Magic" |
| 2013 | Anger Management | Prosecutor | Episode: "Charlie Is an Expert Witness" |
| 2013 | Modern Family | Dryden Dad | Episode: "The Future Dunphys" |
| 2013 | Maron | Teddy | Episode: "Marc's Dad" |
| 2013 | The League | Taco Truck Customer | Episode: "The Bye Week" |
| 2014 | The League | Brian | Episode: "Ménage à Cinq" |
| 2014 | See Dad Run | Director | Episodes: "See Dad Watch Janie Run Away" & "See Dad Fire Original Katie... Again" |
| 2015 | Major Crimes | Avery Cook | Episode: "Thick as Thieves" |
| 2016 | Bungo Stray Dogs | Guy | Episode: "Teaching Them to Kill, Then to Die" |
| 2016 | Bungo Stray Dogs | Motojirou Kajii | Episode: "The Strategy of Conflict" |
| 2017 | The Adventures of Puss in Boots | Various roles | Episode: "Too Many Cats" |
| 2017 | Bizarre Bloopers | Narrator | |
| 2018 | The Arrangement | Howie Tarses | Episode: "Surface Tension" |
| 2018 | Nobodies | Warm-Up Comic | Episode: "Tape Night" |
| 2019 | Ultraman | Mitsuhiro Ide | 2 episodes |
| 2019 | Mood Swings | Dr. Sitwell | |
| 2020 | Henry Danger | Mr. Wallabee | Episode: "Mr. Nice Guy" |
| 2020 | Grown-ish | Johnny | Episode: "Thinkin Bout You" |
| 2021 | Danger Force | Mr. Nice Guy | Episode: "Miles Has Visions" |
| 2021 | The Rigmarole | Improvisor | Episode: "A Punishing Victory" |
