= Morven (Markham, Virginia) =

Historic house in Virginia, United States

- U.S. National Register of Historic Places
- Virginia Landmarks Register
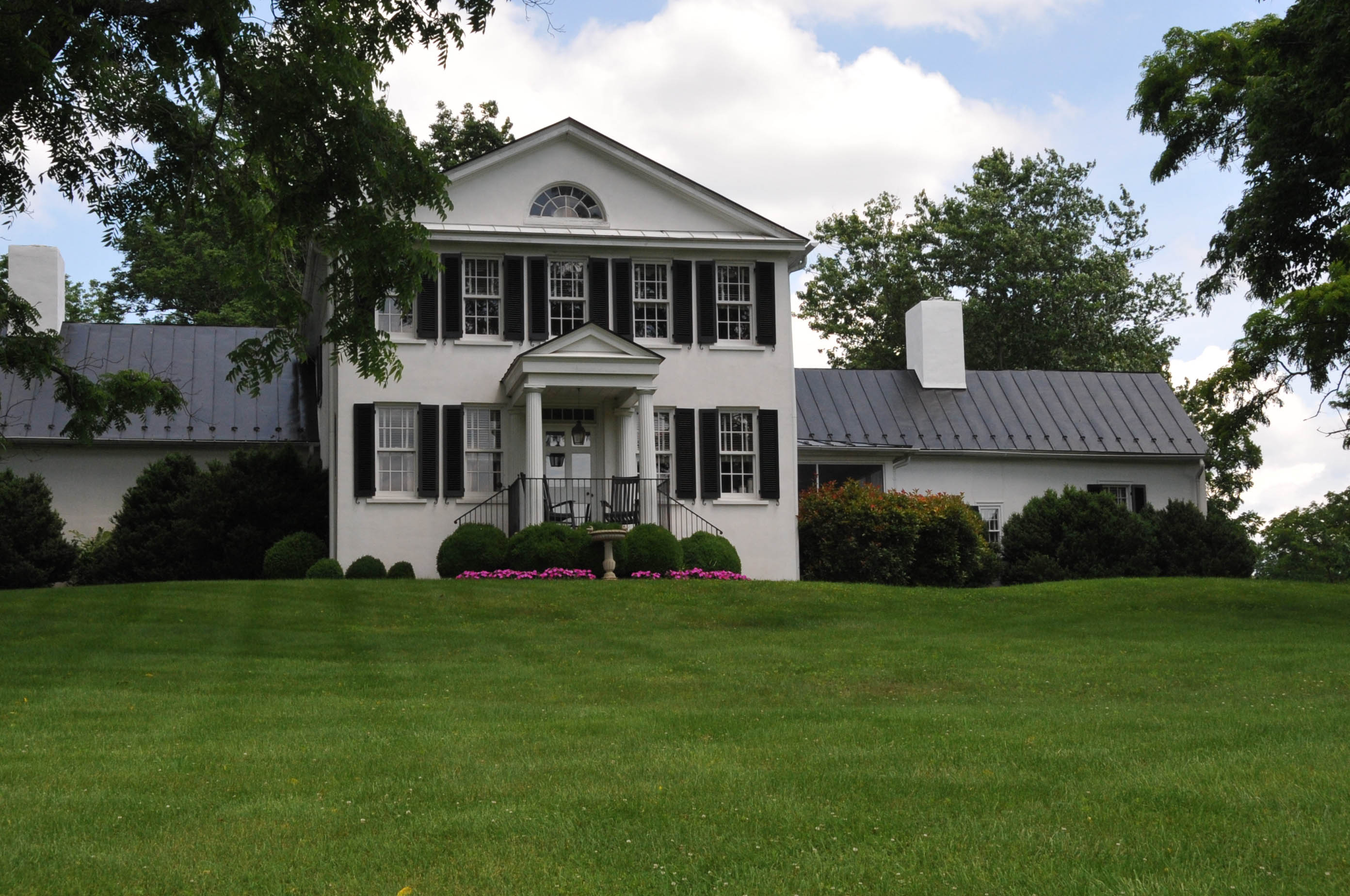

- Location within Northern Virginia Location within Virginia Location within the United States
- Location: 3918 Leeds Manor Rd., near Markham, Virginia
- Coordinates: 38°52′21″N 77°59′51″W
- Area: 40 acres (16 ha)
- Built: 1820
- Architectural style: Federal
- NRHP reference No.: 02000597
- VLR No.: 030-0864

Significant dates
- Added to NRHP: May 30, 2002
- Designated VLR: March 14, 2001

Morven is a historic home located near Markham, Fauquier County, Virginia. The house consists of four one-to-two story, three-bay, gable-roofed houses dating from the late-18th to mid-19th centuries and in the Federal style. The houses were sequentially built in log, frame and stone at right angles of each other. The house is in a cross plan, with an open courtyard in the middle. Also on the property are the contributing meat house and stone summer kitchen (c. 1820).

It was listed on the National Register of Historic Places in 2002.
