= Richard Marshall (United States Army officer) =

United States Army general (1895–1973)

Richard Jaquelin Marshall
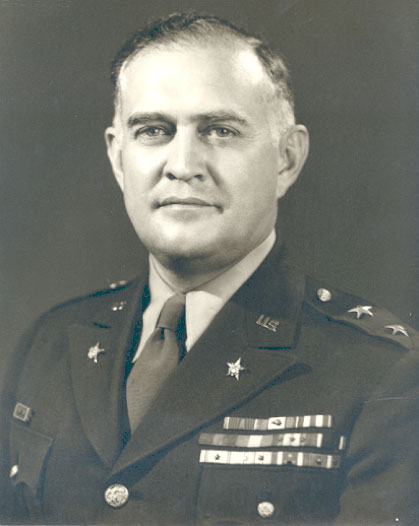
- Born: 16 June 1895; Markham, Virginia, U.S.
- Died: 3 August 1973 (aged 78); Fort Lauderdale, Florida, U.S.
- Burial place: Arlington National Cemetery, Arlington County, Virginia, U.S.
- Relatives: BG St. Julien R. Marshall; George C. Marshall (Distant Cousin); John Marshall (Ancestor)
- Military career
- Allegiance: United States
- Branch: United States Army
- Service years: 1915–1946
- Rank: Major General
- Service number: 0-4635
- Units: Field Artillery Branch
- Conflicts: Pancho Villa Expedition; World War I World War II
- Awards: Distinguished Service Cross; Army Distinguished Service Medal (3); Silver Star; Legion of Merit; Distinguished Service Star (Philippines) (2); Legion of Honour (France) Order of Orange-Nassau (Netherlands)
- Other work: Superintendent of the Virginia Military Institute

Major General Richard Jaquelin Marshall (16 June 1895 – 3 August 1973) was a senior officer in the United States Army.

He served in the 1st Division during World War I and became the Chief of Staff of United States Army Forces in the Pacific Theater of Operations by the end of World War II.

== Early life and education ==
Marshall was born in Markham, Fauquier County, Virginia, on 16 June 1895, the son of Marion Lewis Marshall and his wife Rebecca Coke Marshall. His maternal grandfather, Richard Coke Marshall, was a colonel for the Confederacy in the Civil War, and great-grandson of the fourth Supreme Court Chief Justice, John Marshall. He was also a distant cousin of George Catlett Marshall. He attended public schools and Norfolk Academy in Norfolk from 1907 to 1911.

In 1911, he entered Virginia Military Institute, Lexington, Virginia. He graduated eighth in his class of 56 with a Bachelor of Science degree in electrical engineering in 1915, was an initiate of the Beta Commission of the Kappa Alpha Order, and went to work as an assistant chemist for Consolidated Electric Light and Power Co., in Baltimore, Maryland. He enlisted in the 4th Maryland Infantry, National Guard while employed in Baltimore. When the Guard was called into the service for the Mexican Border War, 18 June 1916, he was commissioned First Lieutenant and Battalion Adjutant. While at Eagle Pass, Texas, in August, 1916 he took examinations for the Regular Army and was commissioned a second lieutenant in the field artillery in November 1916. In March, 1917 he joined first Regular Army unit, 8th Field Artillery at Fort Bliss, Texas.

== World War I ==
After the American entry into World War I in April, 1917, expansion of the Regular Army was accelerated and the 2nd Battalion of the 8th Field Artillery was sent to Fort Sill, Oklahoma, to form the 14th Field Artillery. In May Marshall was transferred to the 6th Field Artillery, one of the oldest Regular Army units, and which was then stationed at Douglas, Arizona, preparing for overseas service as one of the units forming the 1st Division. This was the first American division to be sent to serve with the American Expeditionary Forces (AEF) on the Western Front, where it arrived in June.

Marshall saw combat in the Battle of Soissons, the Battle of Saint-Mihiel, and in the Meuse–Argonne offensive, where, on the morning of 1 November 1918, he was wounded by fragments of a German 105 mm shell. He was in army hospitals in France until March 1919, by which time the war had since come to an end, due to the Armistice with Germany. He had been promoted to captain and was a battery commander of B Battery, 6th Field Artillery.

== Between the wars ==
Upon returning to the U.S. after the war, Marshall was assigned to the postwar Quartermaster Corps. He oversaw construction of Fitzsimons Hospital, Denver, Colorado. He was Quartermaster at Ft. Benning, Georgia 1924, then attended Quartermaster School in 1926, graduated in 1927 and was assigned to Ft. Monmouth, NJ.

In 1929 he was sent to the Philippines and assigned as Quartermaster of the Harbor Defenses of Manila and Subic Bays. He took up residence on Corregidor Island at Fort Mills where he had under his direction the start of construction of the West end of the Malinta Hill Tunnel. In World War II this same Tunnel became General MacArthur's Command Post on Corregidor.

Marshall returned to the U.S. in 1932, attending Command and Staff School at Ft. Leavenworth, Ks, followed by the Army Industrial College, Washington, D.C. He graduated in 1935 and after summer maneuvers with the First Army entered the Army War College, graduating 1936. He was then placed in charge of the Water Transportation Branch.

He married Nell B. Mutter. They had two children, Richard J. Marshall, Jr., who died on 2 March 1943 in World War II, and Harriette Marshall Olsen, who married John E. Olson, who survived the Bataan Death March. After Nell died in 1934, he married Isabel Crum in Montgomery, Alabama on 28 December 1935. From the marriage, he gained a stepdaughter, Dorothy, and step son, Lieutenant Kenneth Roscoe Lummus, who died on 28 March 1943.

In 1939, upon the request of General Douglas MacArthur, Marshall was assigned to duty again in the Philippines. A vacancy had occurred through the return of Col. Dwight D. Eisenhower to duty in the U.S. The officers on this duty were assisting Gen. MacArthur in advising the Philippine Commonwealth Government in forming and training an army for the defense of the Islands after Independence which was to be granted in 1946. He was on this duty in July 1941 when Gen. MacArthur was recalled to active duty. He was detailed to General Staff with troops and Deputy Chief of his Command, the United States Army Forces in the Far East. In October, 1941 he was promoted to temporary Colonel.

== World War II ==
After Pearl Harbor, Marshall was promoted to brigadier general and remained as Deputy Chief of Staff. He was left in charge of the old Command Post at #1 Victoria in Manila when General MacArthur went to Corregidor to establish his Command Post on December 24, 1941. He remained there until directed to bring the balance of the Staff to Corregidor, January 1, 1942. As the Japanese invasion of the Philippines advanced, the fall of Corregidor appeared imminent. As a result, on the night of March 11, 1942 MacAurthur, his family, and his staff, including Marshall, evacuated under cover of night in four PT boats of Motor Torpedo Boat Squadron Three, with the lead boat commanded by Lieutenant John D. Bulkeley. After an open ocean voyage of several hundred miles they reached Mindanao, then flew to Darwin, Australia, reaching there on March 17, 1942.

From Darwin, MacArthur chose to travel south by train because of his wife's fear of flying. As Quartermaster, Marshall was sent ahead to assess troop strength and resources for the potential immediate return to the Philippines. In a historic moment, reenacted in the movie, MacArthur, Marshall met MacArthur's train upon arrival in Adelaide and broke the news to him that U.S. forces in the Pacific would not be sufficient to support any sort of immediate effort to recapture the Philippines. This made clear to MacArthur the war would be more than just a few months in duration.

After a few weeks in Australia the Allied arrangements for a Southwest Pacific Command were completed and Marshall was detailed as MacArthur's Deputy Chief of Staff. In July the US Army Service of Supply, SWPA succeeded the former command for the US Army Forces in Australia and he became Commanding General, with promotion to Major General.

In early 1942 Marshall was given additional duty as Deputy Chief of Staff of USAFFE (U.S. Armed Forces Far East) when it was used to provide a US Army agency for MacArthur to exercise command over US Army troops in SWPA (South West Pacific Army). Increase in size of SWPA Command rapidly increased the administrative problems of MacArthur's Headquarters. In November, 1944, he was detailed as MacArthur's Chief of Staff, USAFFE and, when MacArthur became commander of AFPAC (U.S. Army Forces in the Pacific), Marshall became Deputy Chief of Staff.

In 1945, with entry into Japan after the surrender, Marshall became Deputy Chief of Staff of SCAP (Supreme Commander for the Allied Powers). On October 10 he was ordered to Headquarters in Tokyo to take over as the Chief of Staff.

On September 2, 1945, he accompanied MacArthur on board the USS Missouri for the signing of the surrender treaty with the Japanese delegation.

== Post-World War II ==
In May 1946 Marshall was ordered to temporary duty in the Office of the Chief of Staff, US Army, Washington, D.C., in order that he be available to become Superintendent of the Virginia Military Institute.

He retired from the Army on Nov 30, 1946 and became the 7th Superintendent of VMI until he resigned in June 1952. While at VMI his neighbor, Washington and Lee University, conferred upon him the honorary degree of Doctor of Laws (LL D). President Harry S. Truman appointed him to serve as Deputy Chief of the Bell Mission to make an economic survey of the Philippines. He received the rank of Minister without portfolio for that appointment.

== Military record and death ==
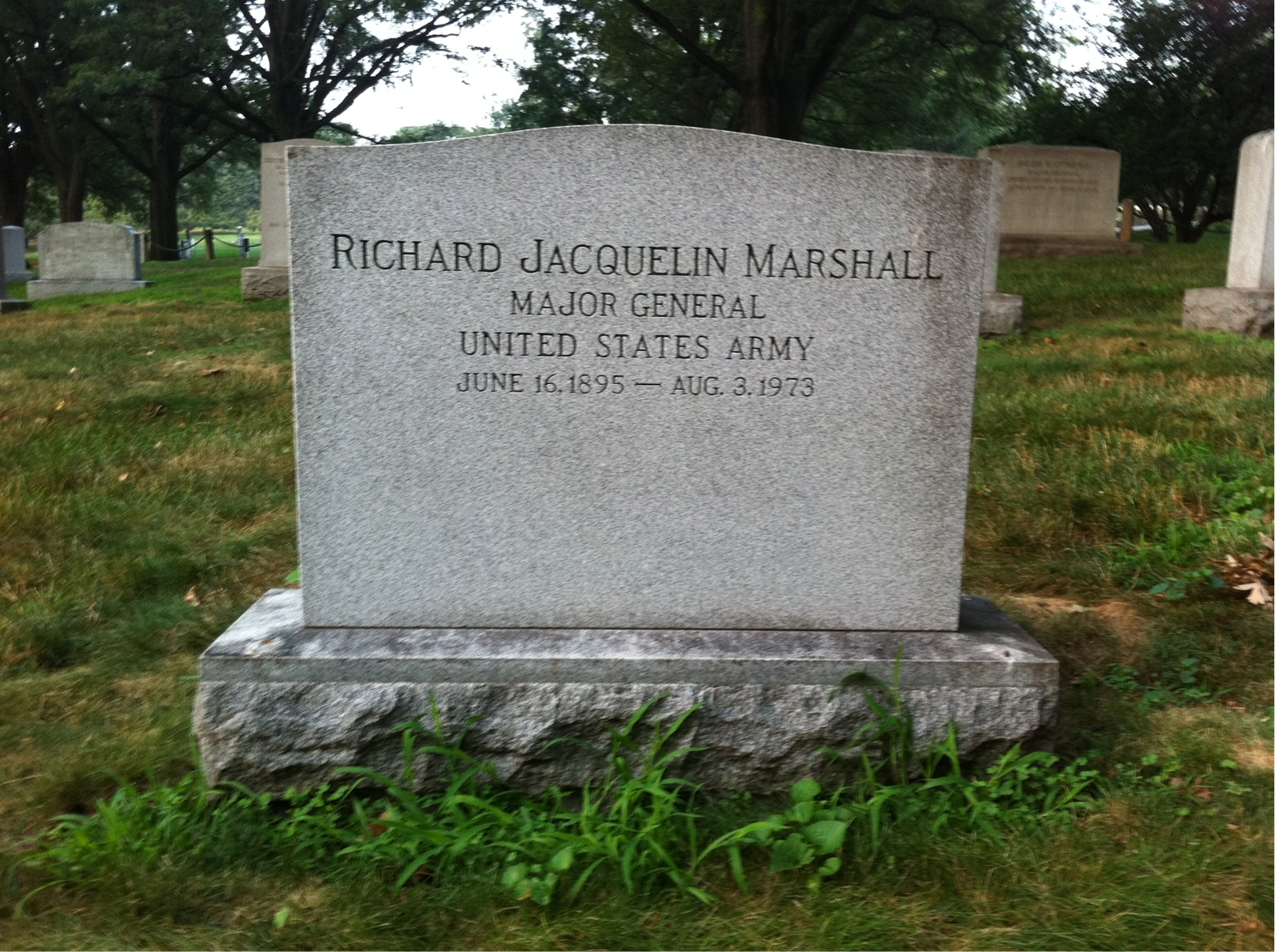
The grave of Major General Richard J. Marshall at Arlington National Cemetery.

During his Army career, Marshall received the Silver Star during World War I, and the Distinguished Service Cross and Army Distinguished Service Medal with two oak leaf clusters from the three command and staff positions that he held in World War II. He was made an Officer of the Legion of Honour of France, and a Grand Officer of the Order of Orange-Nassau with Crossed Swords (Netherlands), and received the Distinguished Service Star of the Philippines with an oak leaf cluster.

During his last year at VMI, the State of Virginia promoted him to Lieutenant General in the Virginia Militia (Unorganized). Following the disruptions of World War II he got the VMI Foundation off the ground with an increase in funds from $100,000 to $600,000. General Marshall, a 1915 graduate, expanded the Corps of Cadets from 300 to 950 during the six years of his administration, both academic and military offerings were expanded and the faculty was enlarged to meet the demands of the growing Cadet Corps, growth made possible by the planning and completion during his administration of the new cadet barracks.

He retired in 1952 after suffering a stroke and moved to Florida. He died at Fort Lauderdale on 3 August 1973, and is buried at Arlington National Cemetery, in Arlington County, Virginia. His brother, Marine Corps Brigadier General St. Julien R. Marshall, was subsequently buried next to him in 1989.

== Decorations ==
Here is the ribbon bar of Major General Richard J. Marshall:

1st Row	Distinguished Service Cross		Army Distinguished Service Medal w/ two OLCs	Silver Star
2nd Row	Legion of Merit	Mexican Border Service Medal	World War I Victory Medal w/ three battle clasps	Army of Occupation of Germany Medal
3rd Row	American Defense Service Medal w/ Foreign Service Clasp	Asiatic-Pacific Campaign Medal w/ silver and bronze service stars	World War II Victory Medal	Officer of the Legion of Honour
4th Row	Grand Officer of the Order of Orange-Nassau	Philippine Distinguished Service Star w/ Bronze Star	Philippine Defense Medal w/ Bronze Star	Philippine Liberation Medal w/ two Bronze Stars

== Bibliography ==
- Couper, William (1952). History of the Shenandoah Valley. New York: Lewis Historical.
- McGill, John (1956). The Beverley Family of Virginia: Descendants of Major Robert Beverley, 1641–1687, and allied families. Columbia, South Carolina: R.L. Bryan.
