= 93rd Fighter-Interceptor Squadron =

93d Fighter-Interceptor Squadron
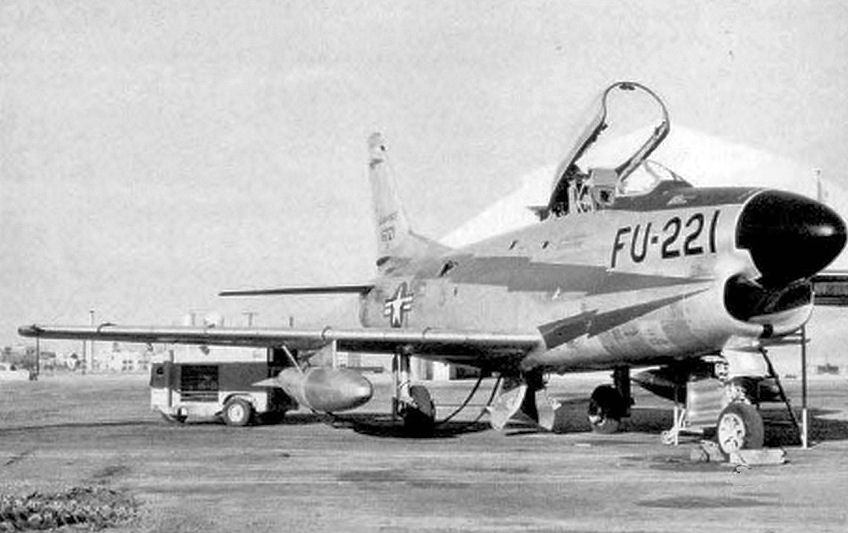
- Squadron F-86D Sabre (Note: Aircraft is North American F-86D-35-NA Sabre serial 51-6221, taken about 1955. Aircraft markings were red lightning bolts on the fuselage.)
- Active: 1942–1945; 1946–1949; 1949–1960
- Country: United States
- Branch: United States Air Force
- Role: Fighter-Interceptor
- Engagements: Mediterranean Theater of Operations; China-Burma-India Theater

Insignia
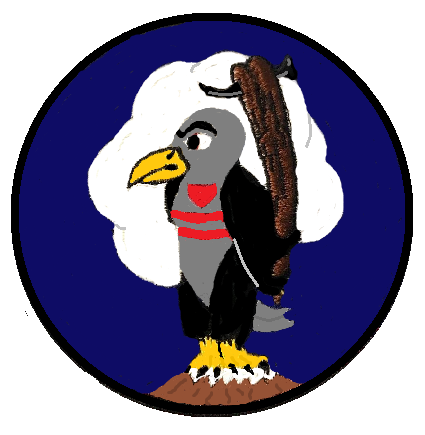
- 93rd Fighter-Interceptor Squadron emblem (Note: Approved 6 August 1958.)

The 93rd Fighter-Interceptor Squadron is an inactive United States Air Force unit. Its last assignment was with the Albuquerque Air Defense Sector at Kirtland Air Force Base, New Mexico, where it was inactivated on 8 July 1960.

The squadron was activated as the 93rd Fighter Squadron. Following training in the United States, it deployed with Lockheed P-38 Lightnings to North Africa, entering combat in January 1943. It moved forward with Allied forces through Sicily to mainland Italy. In the summer of 1944, it was transferred to India, where it retrained on single engine fighters, then to China to reinforce Fourteenth Air Force. It remained in China after V-J Day, but returned to the United States, where it was inactivated at the port of embarkation in November 1945.

The squadron was activated the following year in Hawaii, where it served until inactivating in 1949. Shortly thereafter, it was reactivated at Kirtland and equipped with jet fighters.

== History ==
=== World War II ===
The squadron was activated in early 1942 under III Fighter Command in North Carolina. It trained initially with Bell P-39 Airacobras, it was then re-equipped with Lockheed P-38 Lightnings.

Moved overseas between October 1942 and February 1943, the ground echelon established itself in French Morocco with the force that invaded North Africa on 8 November. The air echelon, which had trained for a time in England, arrived in North Africa between late December 1942 and early February 1943.

The unit began combat with the Twelfth Air Force in January 1943, supporting ground operations during the Allied drive against Axis forces in Tunisia. It patrolled the coast of North Africa and protected Allied shipping in the Mediterranean Sea between April and July 1943. It also provided cover for the convoys that landed troops on Pantelleria island on 11 June and on Sicily on 10 July 1943. The squadron supported the landings at Anzio on 22 January 1944 and flew patrols in that area for a short time.

Transferred to the China-Burma-India Theater, it moved to India in February and March 1944. It initially carried out training with Curtiss P-40 Warhawk and Republic P-47 Thunderbolt aircraft. Moving to China in May, it became part of the Fourteenth Air Force. The squadron continued training and on occasion flew patrols and escort missions before returning to full-time combat duty in January 1945. It attacked enemy airfields and installations, flew escort missions and aided the operations of Chinese ground forces by attacking troop concentrations, ammunition dumps, lines of communication and other targets to hinder Japanese efforts to move men and matèriel to the front.

It was inactivated in China on 27 December 1945.

=== Cold War ===
The squadron was reactivated at Wheeler Field, Hawaii in late 1946. It was equipped with North American P-51 Mustangs and was responsible for the air defense of the Hawaiian Islands until 1949. It was reassigned to Continental Air Command, Ninth Air Force, being stationed in New Mexico. Re-equipped with Lockheed F-80 Shooting Star jet aircraft, it trained as a tactical fighter squadron. The unit upgraded to North American F-86A Sabre day interceptors in 1951, performing air defense duties over the Sandia National Laboratories in New Mexico at Kirtland Air Force Base. On 22 March 1950, F-86As 48–306 and 49-1019 took off in parallel from Kanawha Airport and had an apparent mid-air collision.

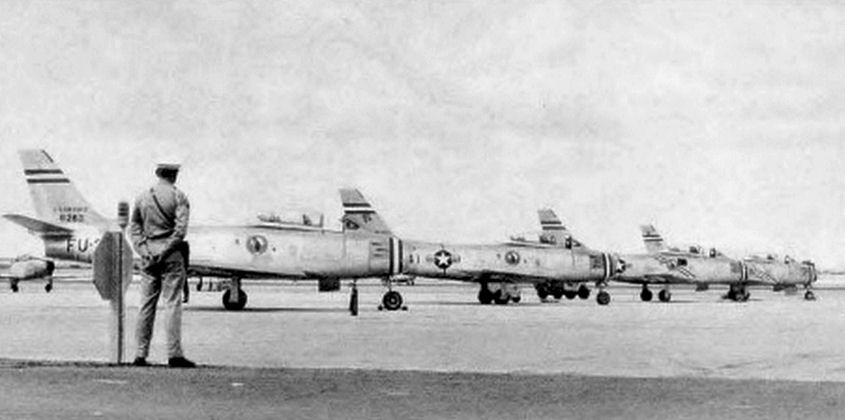
93d Fighter-Interceptor Squadron F-86Fs at Kirtland AFB in 1950

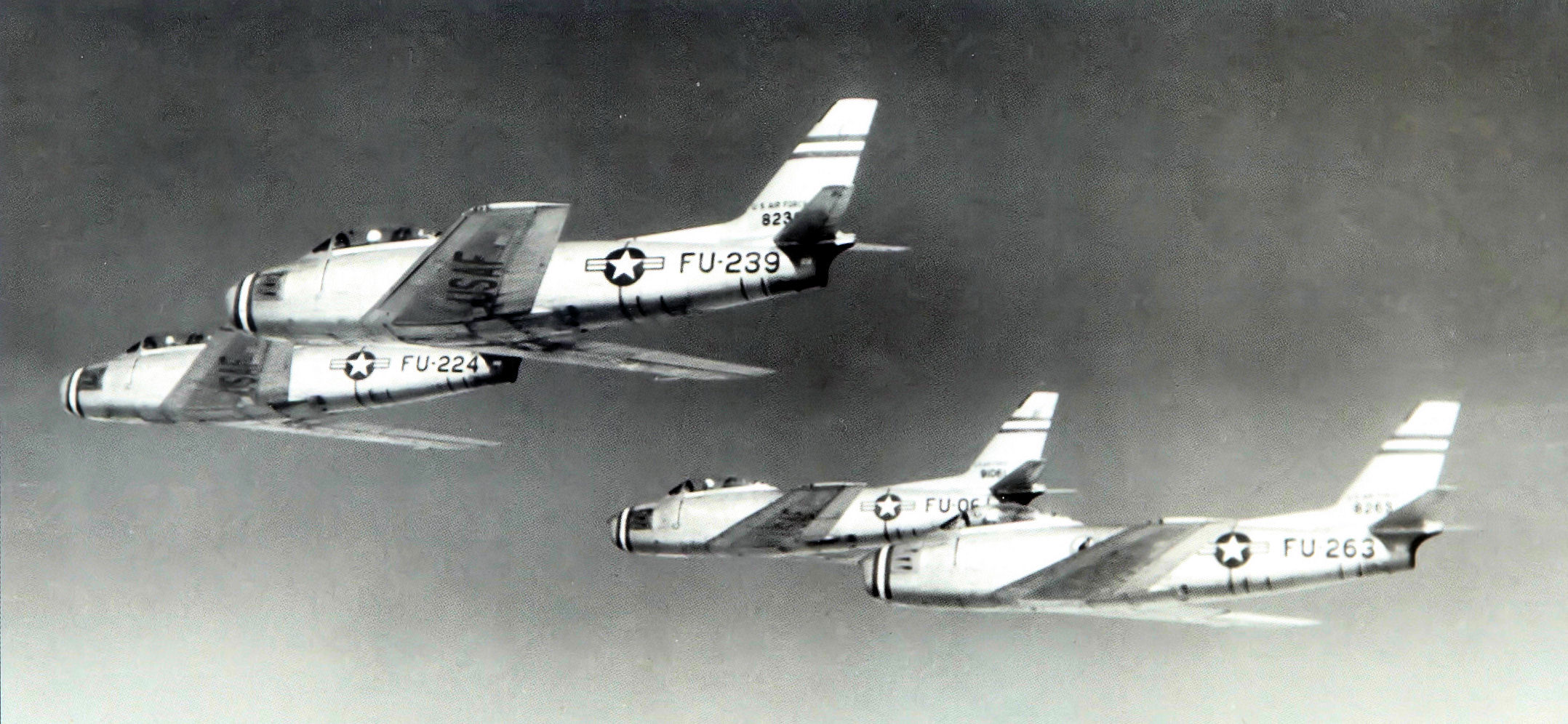
A 93d Fighter-Interceptor Squadron 4 F-86A overflight of Kirtland AFB in 1951 (Note: Identified aircraft are: 48-239, 48-224, 48-263 and 49-1061.)

It was re-equipped with F-86Ds in 1953. It began upgrading to the F-86L in 1957, which incorporated the Semi Automatic Ground Environment, or SAGE computer-controlled direction system for intercepts. The duration of the F-86L's service was destined to be quite brief, since by the time the last 'L' was delivered, the type was already being phased out in favor of supersonic interceptors. The squadron was inactivated in 1960 during an ADC reorganization and phase-out of the F-86 from active-duty units.

== Lineage ==
- Constituted as the 93d Pursuit Squadron (Interceptor) on 13 January 1942

Activated on 9 February 1942
Redesignated the 93d Fighter Squadron on 15 May 1942
Inactivated on 8 December 1945

- Activated on 15 October 1946

Redesignated 93d Fighter-Interceptor Squadron on 20 January 1950
Discontinued on 8 July 1960

=== Assignments ===
- 81st Pursuit Group (later 81st Fighter Group), 9 February 1942 – 8 December 1945
- 81st Fighter Group (later 81st Fighter-Interceptor Group), 15 October 1946 (attached to Albuquerque Air Defense Area after 1 May 1950) (Note: Cornett & Johnson indicate the squadron was reassigned to the 1st Fighter Wing at this time, but neither Maurer nor Ravenstein reflect this assignment. Compare Cornett & Johnson, p. 121 with Maurer, p. 313 and Ravenstein, p. 6.)
- Western Air Defense Force, 10 August 1951 (attached to 34th Air Division)
- 34th Air Division, 6 February 1952
- Albuquerque Air Defense Sector, 1 January – 8 July 1960

=== Stations ===
- Morris Field, North Carolina, 9 February 1942
- Dale Mabry Field, Florida, 1 May 1942
- Muroc Army Airfield, California, 26 June – 4 October 1942
- Port Lyautey Airfield, French Morocco, 10 November 1942
- Berteaux Airfield, Algeria, 19 February 1943
- Youks-les-Bains Airfield, Algeria, 10 March 1943

Operated from Thelepte Airfield, Tunisia, 6 March – c. 5 April 1943

- Bone Airfield, Algeria, 3 April 1943
- Monastir Airfield, Tunisia, 22 May 1943
- Sidi Ahmed Airfield, Tunisia, 23 August 1943
- Castelvetrano Airfield, Sicily, Italy, 21 October 1943
- Montecorvino Airfield, Italy, c. February 1944
- Karachi Airport, India, c. 1 March 1944
- Kwanghan Airfield, China, c. 11 July 1944
- Guskhara Airfield, India, C. October 1944 – 16 October 1945
- Shanghai Airport, China, c. 9 – 17 November 1945
- Camp Stoneman, California, 5 – 8 December 1945
- Wheeler Field, Hawaii, 15 October 1946 – 21 May 1949
- Kirtland Air Force Base, New Mexico, 17 June 1949 – 8 July 1960

=== Aircraft ===
- Bell P-39 Airacobra, 1942–1944
- Lockheed P-38 Lightning, 1943–1944
- Curtiss P-40 Warhawk 1944
- Republic P-47 Thunderbolt, 1944–1945
- North American P-51 (later F-51) Mustang, 1946–1949
- Lockheed F-80 Shooting Star, 1949
- North American F-86A Sabre, 1951-1953
- North American F-86F Sabre, 1953
- North American F-86D Sabre Interceptor, 1953-1957
- North American F-86L Sabre, 1957-1960

== See also ==
List of accidents and incidents involving military aircraft (1950–1954)
