= John Marshall's Leeds Manor Rural Historic District =

Historic district in Virginia, United States

- U.S. National Register of Historic Places
- U.S. Historic district
- Virginia Landmarks Register
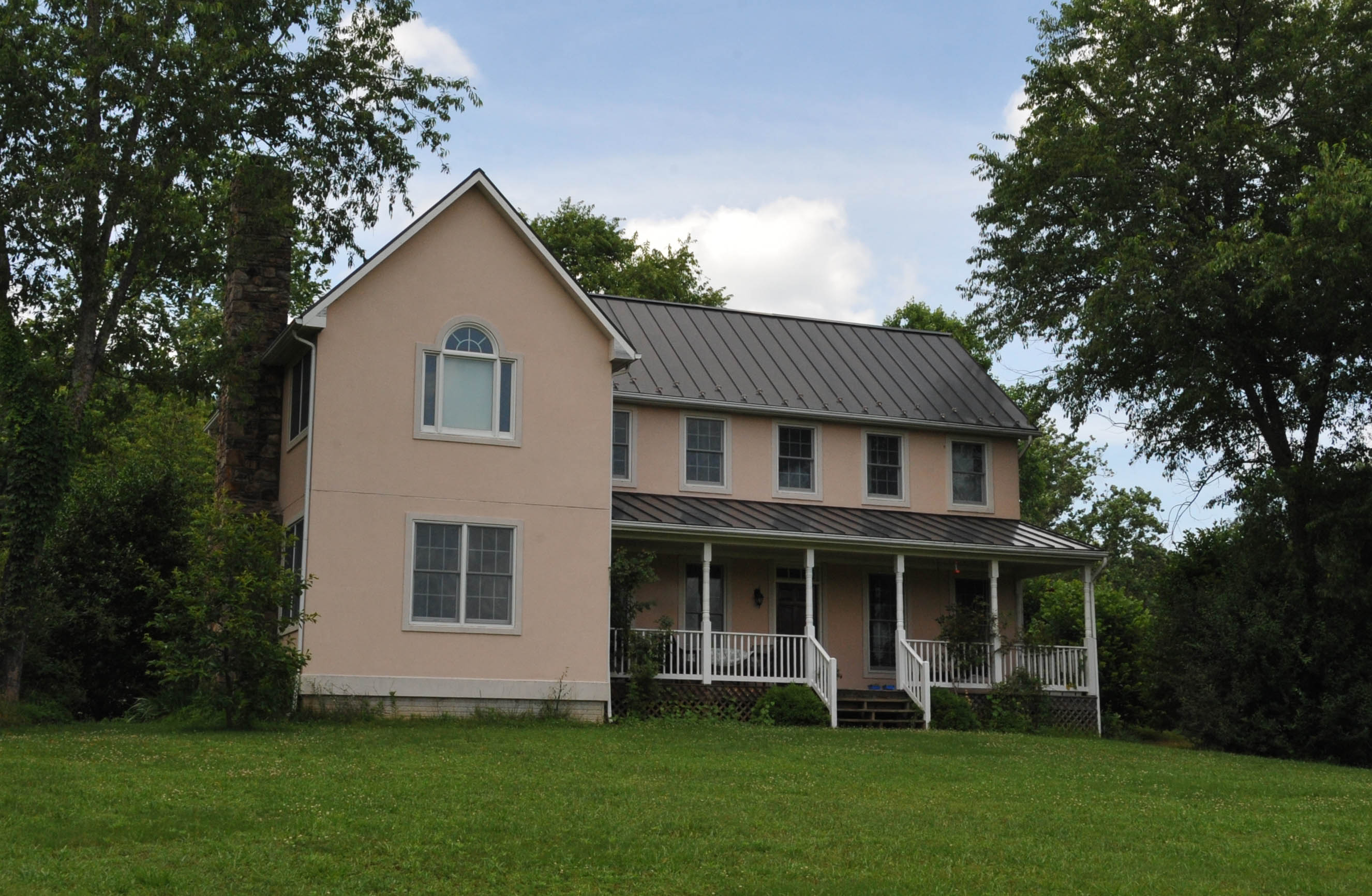

- Location within Northern Virginia Location within Virginia Location within the United States
- Location: Pts of E. John Marshall Hwy, Farm House Rd., Leeds Manor Rd., Old Markham Rd. Poverty Hollow Ln, Rail Stop Rd. etc., near Markham, Fauquier County, Virginia
- Coordinates: 38°53′50″N 77°59′57″W
- Area: 22,184 acres (8,978 ha)
- Built: 1736
- Architect: Sutton, William
- Architectural style: Colonial, Early Republic
- NRHP reference No.: 07001138
- VLR No.: 030-5428

Significant dates
- Added to NRHP: November 1, 2007
- Designated VLR: September 5, 2007

John Marshall's Leeds Manor Rural Historic District is a national historic district located near Markham, in Fauquier County, northeastern Virginia.

== Description ==
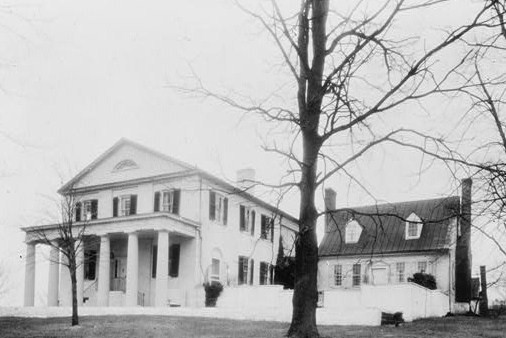
John Marshall's Leeds plantation house.

The historic district encompasses 395 contributing buildings, 45 contributing sites, and 24 contributing structures. The district is characterized as a cohesive locality that is characterized by large expanses of open agricultural land, historic roadways, and rolling foothill terrain.

The architectural resources located within the district are a diverse collection of types and styles dating from the mid-18th century through the mid-20th century.

It was listed on the National Register of Historic Places in 2007.
