= St. Julien R. Marshall =

United States Marine Corps general (1904–1989)

St. Julien Ravenel Marshall
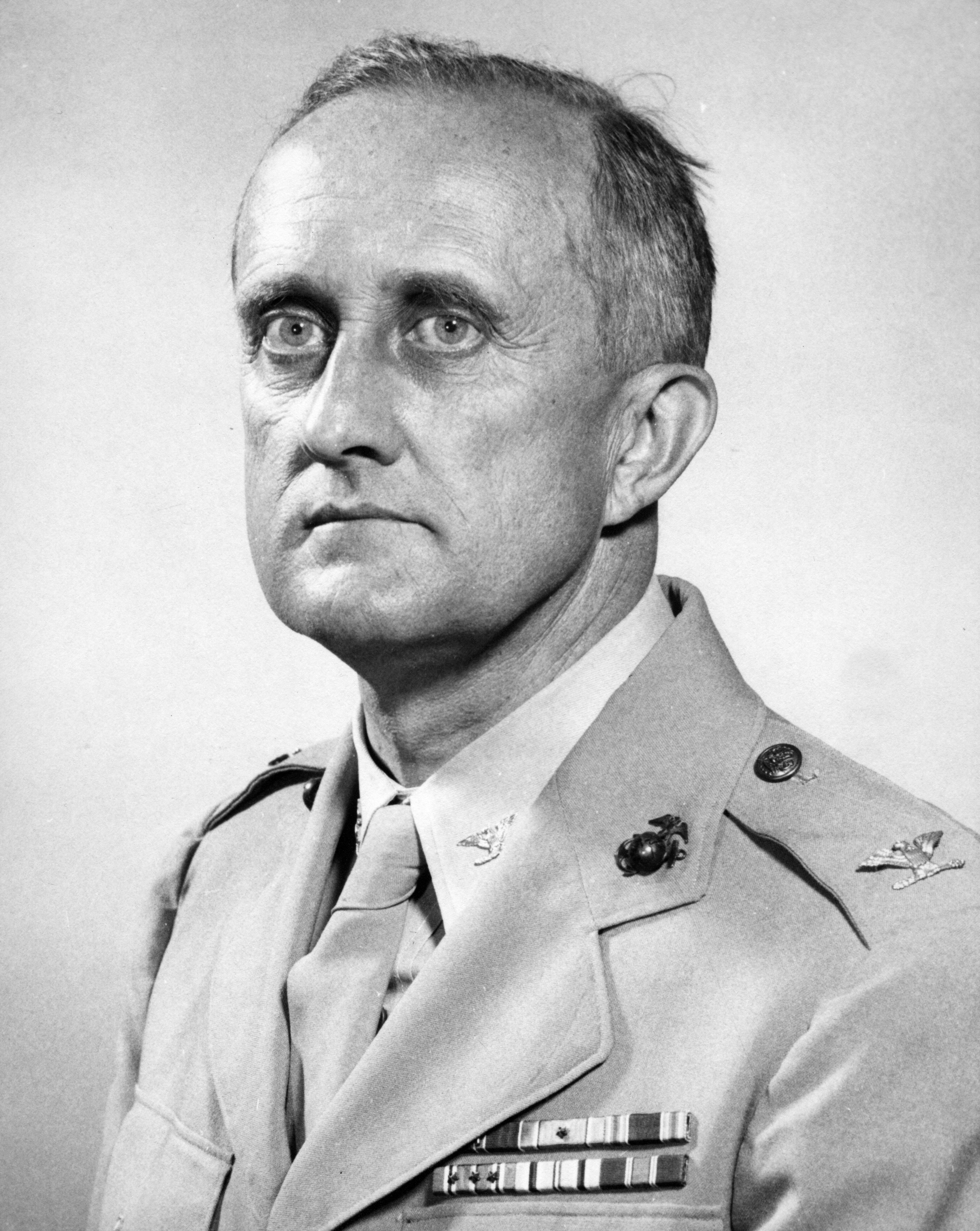
- Marshall as Colonel, USMC
- Born: January 27, 1904; Markham, Virginia, US
- Died: March 24, 1989 (aged 85); Arlington, Virginia, US
- Burial place: Arlington National Cemetery
- Relatives: MG Richard Marshall (brother)
- Military career
- Allegiance: United States of America
- Branch: United States Marine Corps
- Service years: 1924–1955
- Rank: Brigadier general
- Commands: G-2 of V Amphibious Corps
- Conflicts: World War II: Aleutian Islands campaign; Battle of Tarawa; Battle of Kwajalein; Battle of Saipan; Battle of Tinian; Recapture of Guam
- Awards: Bronze Star Medal

St. Julien Ravenel Marshall (January 27, 1904 – March 24, 1989) was officer in the United States Marine Corps with the rank of brigadier general. He distinguished himself as Intelligence officer (G-2) of V Amphibious Corps during World War II. Marshall also served with the group that established the Central Intelligence Agency after the war. His older brother was Major General Richard Marshall.

== Biography ==
St. Julien Ravenel Marshall was born on January 27, 1904, in Markham, Virginia, as the son of Marion Lewis Marshall and his wife Rebecca Coke Marshall. His maternal grandfather, Richard Coke Marshall, was a colonel for the Confederacy in the Civil War, and great-grandson of the first supreme court justice, John Marshall. He was also a distant cousin of George C. Marshall, who served as Chief of Staff of the United States Army in World War II.

He attended the Central High School in Washington, D.C., and subsequently received appointment to the Virginia Military Institute in Lexington and graduated in summer 1924 with a Bachelor of Science degree. Marshall subsequently entered the Marine Corps service and was commissioned second lieutenant. He was then ordered to the Basic School at Philadelphia Navy Yard for basic officer training.

After completion of his training, Marshall was attached to the Marine detachment aboard the battleship USS Utah and spent next several years at sea. He then served at the Marine Corps Base Quantico and with the Marine barracks in the Virgin Islands. Marshall attended the Harvard Law School in Cambridge, Massachusetts, and received law degree in 1934. He then served as JAG officer on the staff of commandant, 14th Naval District at Pearl Harbor, Hawaii under Rear Admiral Harry E. Yarnell.

Marshall served in various legal assignments until the beginning of World War II, when he joined 1st Marine Brigade under Major General Holland Smith. He became Smith's protege and followed him as intelligence officer on the staffs of 1st Marine Division, Amphibious Force, Atlantic Fleet and V Amphibious Corps. Marshall participated in most of the Pacific campaigns (Aleutian Islands, Tarawa, Kwajalein, Saipan, Tinian and Guam), reached the rank of colonel and received the Bronze Star Medal with Combat "V" for his service in Pacific.

He returned to the United States in October 1944 and served on the staff of Marine Corps Schools, Quantico under Brigadier General William T. Clement until summer 1945, when he joined Fleet Marine Force, Pacific on Hawaii as Intelligence officer (G-2).

In 1947, Marshall served with the first group that established the Central Intelligence Agency and remained with that bureau until 1950. He was later transferred to the Headquarters Marine Corps in Washington, D.C., and assumed duty as head of the Discipline Branch, Personnel Department. Marshall retired on June 30, 1955, after 31 years of active service and was advanced to the rank of brigadier general on the retired list for having been specially commended in combat.

Following his retirement from the Marine Corps, he worked as a lawyer with the Alexandria law firm of Davis & Ruffner until his second retirement in 1969. Marshall was a founding member of the Army Navy Country Club, the Jamestowne Society, The Order of Founders and Patriots of America, and the Virginia Society of the Cincinnati.

Brigadier General Marshall died on March 24, 1989, of cardiopulmonary arrest at his home in Arlington, Virginia. He is buried next to his wife Marion Russell Marshall (1904–1998) at Arlington National Cemetery, in Arlington, Virginia. His brother, Major General Richard Marshall, is buried also next to him.

== Decorations ==
Here is the ribbon bar of Brigadier General St. Julien R. Marshall:

1st Row	Bronze Star Medal with Combat "V"		American Defense Service Medal with Base Clasp
2nd Row	American Campaign Medal	Asiatic-Pacific Campaign Medal with three 3/16 inch service stars	World War II Victory Medal
