= United States Army Forces in the Far East =

United States Armed Forces Far East (USAFFE) Hukbong Katihan ng Estados Unidos sa Malayong Silangan
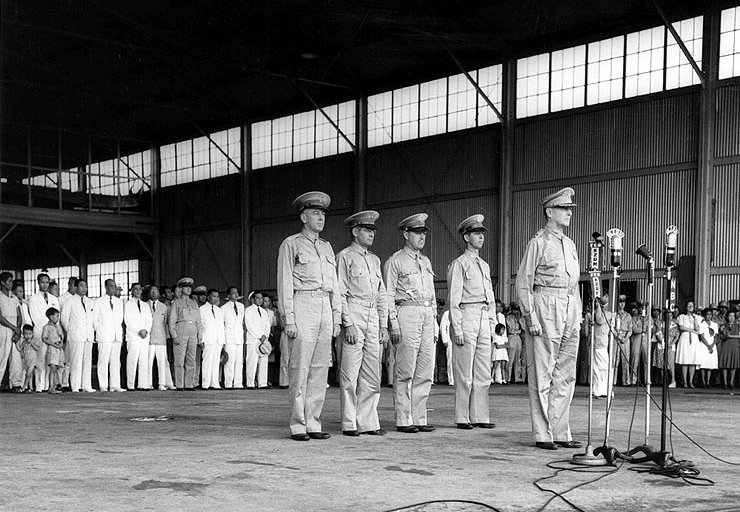
- Lt. Gen. Douglas MacArthur conducts a ceremony formally inducting the Philippine Army Air Corps into United States Army Forces in the Far East at Camp Murphy, Rizal on 15 August 1941. Behind MacArthur, from left to right, are: Lt. Col. Richard K. Sutherland, Col. Harold H. George, Lt. Col William F. Marquat, and Maj. LeGrande A. Diller.
- Active: 26 July 1941 – 30 June 1946
- Country: (Commonwealth of the Philippines) Philippine Commonwealth; United States
- Branch: Regular Army
- Role: Territorial Defense
- Size: 250,000
- Part of: United States Department of War; ABDA Command; South West Pacific Area
- Garrison/HQ: AMP Bldg., Brisbane, Australia; Melbourne, Australia; Malinta Tunnel, Corregidor; No. 1 Calle Victoria, Manila
- Engagements: World War II

Commanders
- Chief of Staff: BGen (Later LGen.) Richard K. Sutherland
- Deputy Chief of Staff: BGen (Later MGen.) Richard J. Marshall
- G1 Personnel: Col. Charles Stivers
- G2 Intelligence: Col. (Later MGen.) Charles A. Willoughby
- G3 Operations: Col. Constant Irwin
- G4 Supply: Col. (Later BGen.) Lewis C. Beebe
- Chief, Corps of Engineers: Colonel (Later BGen.) Hugh John Casey
- Chief, Quartermaster Corps: BGen. Charles C. Drake
- Chief, Signal Corps: BGen. Spencer B. Akin
- Notable commanders: General Douglas MacArthur Major General Richard J. Marshall Major General Horace H. Fuller

Insignia
- Emblem

United States Armed Forces Far East (USAFFE) (Filipino: Hukbong Katihan ng Estados Unidos sa Malayong Silangan; Spanish: Fuerzas del Ejército de los Estados Unidos en el Lejano Oriente) was a military formation of the United States Army active from 1941 to 1946. The new command's headquarters was created on 26 July 1941, at No. 1, Calle Victoria, Manila, Philippines, with General Douglas MacArthur as commander. The Chief of Staff was Brigadier General Richard K. Sutherland and the Deputy Chief of Staff was Lieutenant Colonel Richard J. Marshall. The core of this command (including MacArthur, Marshall, and Sutherland) was drawn from the Office of the Military Advisor to the Commonwealth Government of the Philippines.

Creation of this command led to the subordination of the headquarters of the Philippine Department of the U.S. Army, as a service command, since planning and tactical control were now under USAFFE control. MacArthur explains, "It became an administrative echelon. It was analogous to a corps area". MacArthur recommended that Philippine Department commander Major General George Grunert be reassigned, as his services were no longer needed. On 23 October, Grunert returned to the United States and MacArthur was temporarily appointed as the Philippine Department's commander.

== History ==
In January 1941, the intelligence officer (G-2) of the Philippine Department recommended, to his superior in Washington, D.C., that an American high command in the Far East be created, with the commander of the Philippine Department as its designated commander. It does not appear this idea was seriously considered until Douglas MacArthur suggested, to the Chief of Staff of the United States Army, that such a command be created with MacArthur as the Far Eastern Commander.

On 6 June, Acting Chief of the War Plans Division Brigadier General Leonard T. Gerow noted that he saw no need for such a command, as US Forces in the Far East were concentrated in the Philippines. As such, Gerow argued that should a "crisis" occur, then MacArthur should become the commander of, not some new command, but rather, of the Philippine Department itself.

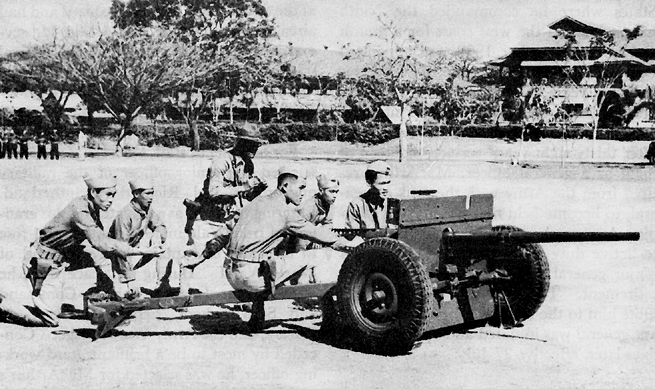
Philippine Scouts being trained at Fort William McKinley on a 37 mm (M3) anti-tank gun.

On 20 June, Army Chief of Staff George C. Marshall informed MacArthur, "Both the Secretary of War (Stimson) and I are much concerned about the situation in the Far East. Your qualifications and experience make you the logical selection for the Army Commander in the Far East should the situation approach a crisis. The Secretary has delayed recommending your appointment as he does not feel the time has arrived for such action. At the proper time, he will recommend to the President that you be so appointed."

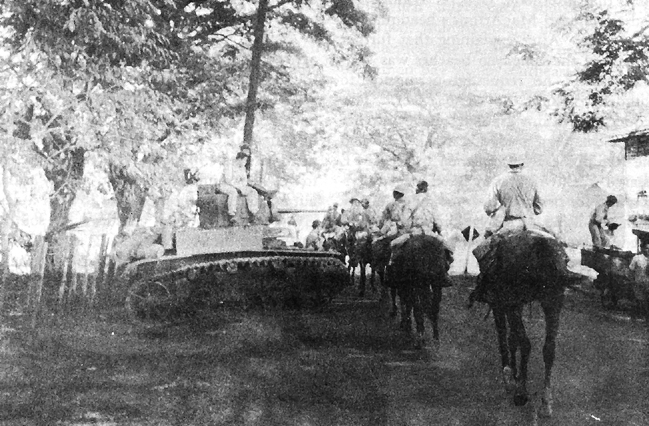
December 1941. The 26th Cavalry Regiment of the Philippine Scouts moves past a M3 Stuart tank, into Pozorrubio, in an attempt to repel Japanese forces.

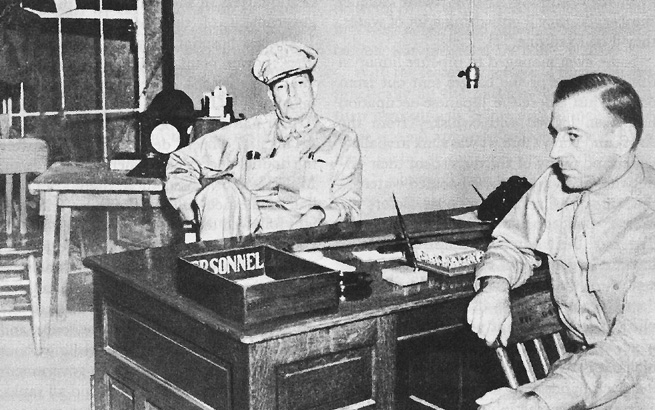
General MacArthur and Lieutenant General Richard K. Sutherland in Malinta Tunnel, March 1942

On 17 July, Gerow made the following recommendations:

- The President should call into the service of the United States all organized military forces of the Commonwealth of the Philippines;
- General MacArthur should be called to active duty as a Major General and assigned as commander of Army Forces in the Far East;
- $10,000,000, from the President's Emergency Fund should be allotted to cover the costs of mobilization and training of the Philippine Army;
- Training of the Philippine Army be financed from the sugar excise fund, or from other funds; and
- 425 U.S. Army reserve officers be sent to the Philippines to assist in mobilization and training.

On 25 July, Secretary of War Henry L. Stimson requested that President Roosevelt issue orders calling the military forces of the Commonwealth into active service for the United States. Stimson explains, "All practical steps should be taken to increase the defensive strength of the Philippine Islands".

The following day, Roosevelt froze all Japanese assets within the United States and issued the orders to absorb the forces of the Philippine Army. That same day, the United States Department of War created the USAFFE command, with jurisdiction over the Philippine Department and the military forces of Commonwealth of the Philippines (seemingly the Philippine Army, with two regular and ten reserve divisions, and the Philippine Army Air Corps). At the same time, MacArthur was recalled to active duty, with the rank of lieutenant general, as the USAFFE commander, from his positions as military advisor to the Philippine government and Field Marshal of the Philippine Army.

On 4 November 1941 USAFFE formally created the North Luzon Force, South Luzon Force, and the Visayas-Mindanao Force. Actually all had been in existence for several months.

Following the Japanese invasion of the Philippines in December 1941, the short-lived American-British-Dutch-Australian Command (ABDACOM) was formed on 1 January 1942, to control all Allied forces in South East Asia and the South West Pacific. ABDACOM nominally controlled USAFFE forces, although the latter was effectively an independent force.

In February 1942, the US Army established United States Army Forces in Australia under Lieutenant General George Brett under the authority of General MacArthur. Australia will the launching area for supplies and reinforcements in the Philippines. This expanded USAFFE to a theater of Operations command rather than being only within the Philippines. US Army Forces in Dutch East Indies under MGen. Elliot S. Thorpe, was also established as Air Fields are created for the fighters escorting ships or Cargo planes.

In March, due to the worsening Allied position in Asia and the Pacific, Roosevelt ordered MacArthur to relocate his command to Australia. MacArthur's famous speech regarding the Philippines, in which he said, "I came out of Bataan and I shall return" was made on 20 March at Terowie, South Australia during his first contact with the press in Australia. General Jonathan Wainwright officially assumed control of the remaining forces in the Philippines, now known as United States Forces in the Philippines (USFIP) on 23 March.

On 18 April 1942, ABDACOM was replaced by General Headquarters (GHQ), Southwest Pacific Area (SWPA) in Melbourne, including USFIP. MacArthur was appointed Supreme Commander, SWPA. USFIP, with the exception of some ad hoc guerilla and resistance outfits, had surrendered to Japanese by 8 May.

MacArthur formally reconstituted USAFFE in Australia in February 1943, to assume responsibility for all administrative staff duties pertaining to U.S. Army units in the SWPA, as well as control of guerrilla forces in the Philippines.

On 20 October 1944, the recapture of the Philippines commenced when Allied forces landed in Leyte Gulf. The campaign was declared completed on 4 July 1945 Major General Richard J. Marshall assumed command and MacArthur assumed Allied Powers in Asia Pacific command in preparation for the Invasion of Japan.

USAFFE was absorbed by US Army, Western Pacific under Lieutenant General Robert Richardson, even before end of war and since bulk of US Army was stationed in Japan it was formally dissolved in the lead-up to Philippine independence on 4 July 1946.

In 1947, the term was revitalized with the creation of Far East Command under General MacArthur in Tokyo. "General MacArthur, however, retained direct command of Army components, wearing a second hat as Commanding General, Army Forces Far East (CG AFFE)." "In 1952, after General MacArthur had left.. the headquarters of Army Forces Far East was fully staffed and placed on a par with the other two component commands, and the Far East Command was given a truly joint staff."

== Order of battle ==
=== 31 July 1941 ===
Total Strength—22,532 (1,434 officers—21,098 enlisted, including 11,937 Philippine Scouts)

- USAFFE Headquarters (5)
- Philippine Department Headquarters (289)
- Philippine Division (10,473)
- Harbor Defenses of Manila and Subic Bays (5,360)
- Philippine Army Air Corps (2,407)
- 26th Cavalry Regiment (838)
- 43rd Infantry Regiment (329)
- 86th Field Artillery Battalion (PS)(388)
- 88th Field Artillery Regiment (PS)(518)
- 808th Military Police Company (69)
- Service Detachments (1,836)
- Other (20)

=== 30 November 1941 ===
Total Strength: 31,095 (2,504 officers and 28,591 enlisted, including 11,957 Philippine Scouts)

- USAFFE Headquarters (61)
- Philippine Department (553)
- North Luzon Force (38)
- South Luzon Force (10)
- Visayas-Mindanao Force (9)
- Philippine Division (10,233)
- Harbor Defenses of Manila and Subic Bays (5,225)
- Far East Air Force (5,609)
- 26th Cavalry Regiment (PS)(842)
- 43d Infantry Regiment (PS)(328)
- 86th Field Artillery Battalion (PS)(395)
- 88th Field Artillery Regiment (PS)(538)
- 200th Coast Artillery (AA) Regiment (1,809)
- 192nd Tank Battalion (588)
- 194th Tank Battalion (410)
- 808th Military Police Company (160)
- Service Detachments (4,268)
- Other (19)

=== 8 December 1941 ===
- North Luzon Force - Major General Jonathan M.Wainwright IV
  - 11th Infantry Division
  - 21st Infantry Division
  - 31st Infantry Division
  - 71st Infantry Division
  - 86th Field Artillery Regiment
  - 26th US Cavalry (Motorized) Regiment (PS)
  - 301st US Field Artillery Regiment
  - 1/60th US Coast Artillery (AA)
  - 200th US Coast Artillery Regiment
  - Provisional Light Tank Group
  - 86th Quartermaster Company
- South Luzon Force - Major General George S. Parker (Later Major General Albert F. Jones was acting commander until withdrawal to Bataan.)
  - 41st Infantry Division
  - 51st Infantry Division
  - 2nd Provisional Group
  - Provisional Infantry Brigade (PC)
  - Battery A & D, 86th Field Artillery
  - 515th Coast Artillery (AA) Regiment
  - Company D & C, 192nd US Tank Battalion
- Visayas-Mindanao Force - Major General William F. Sharp, USA
  - 61st Infantry Division - BGen. Bradford Chynoweth
  - 81st Infantry Division - BGen. Guy O. Fort
  - 101st Infantry Division - BGen. Joseph Vanchon
- Harbor Defenses of Manila and Subic Bays - Major General George F. Moore, USA
  - Seaward Defense Command - Col. Paul Bunker
    - 91st Coast Artillery Regiment (PS)
    - 92nd Coast Artillery Regiment (PS)
    - 89th Coast Artillery Regiment (PS)
  - Coast Artillery (AA)
    - 60th US Coast Artillery (AA)

=== January 1942 ===
- Luzon Force
- Visayas-Mindanao Force
- Coast Artillery and Harbor Defense Command

=== March 1942 ===
- US Army Forces in the Philippines - Lieutenant General Jonathan M. Wainwright IV, USA
  - Luzon Force - Major General Edward P.King Jr
  - Visayan Force - Brigadier General Bradford Chynoweth
  - Mindanao Force - Major General William F. Sharp
  - Coast Artillery and Harbor Defense Command - Major General George Moore, USA
- US Army Forces Australia - Lieutenant General George Brett, USAAC
- I US Corps - Major General Robert Eichelberger, USA
- 5th US Air Force - Major General Lewis Brereton, USA

=== 1943 ===
- Sixth United States Army - Lieutenant General Walter Krueger, USA
  - X Corps
  - IV Corps
  - I US Corps - Major General Robert Eichelberger, USA
- 5th Air Force - Major General George C. Kenney, USAAC

=== 1944 ===
- 6th US Army (Alamo Force) - Lieutenant General Walter Krueger, USA
  - 6th US Special Reconnaissance Unit (Alamo Scouts)
  - 6th Ranger Battalion
  - X Corps
  - IV Corps
  - I US Corps
- 8th US Army - Lieutenant General Robert Eichelberger, USA
  - IX Corps
  - XI Corps
- 5th US Air Force - Lieutenant General George C. Kenney, USAAC
- 13th US Air Force - Lieutenant General Ennis Whitehead, USAAC

== Awards ==
USAFFE received four Distinguished Unit Citations (later converted to Presidential Unit Citations) for the following time periods -

- 7 December 1941 to 10 May 1942 (WD GO 22-42 amended by DA GO 46-48)
- 8 to 31 December 1941 (WD GO 14-42)
- 12 January to 14 February 1942 (WD GO 32-42)
- 21 January 1942 (WD GO 14-42)

USAFFE also received the Philippine Presidential Unit Citation.

== See also ==
- Asiatic Fleet
- Military History of the Philippines
- Military History of the United States
