= MacArthur (1977 film) =

1977 film by Joseph Sargent

- Theatrical release poster
- Directed by: Joseph Sargent
- Written by: Hal Barwood; Matthew Robbins
- Produced by: Frank McCarthy
- Starring: Gregory Peck; Ed Flanders; Dan O'Herlihy
- Cinematography: Mario Tosi
- Edited by: George Jay Nicholson
- Music by: Jerry Goldsmith
- Production company: Universal Pictures
- Distributed by: Universal Pictures
- Release date: July 15, 1977
- Running time: 130 minutes
- Country: United States
- Language: English
- Budget: $9 million
- Box office: $16.3 million (US)

MacArthur is a 1977 American biographical war film directed by Joseph Sargent and starring Gregory Peck in the eponymous role as American General of the Army Douglas MacArthur.

== Plot ==
The film portrays Douglas MacArthur's life from 1942, before the Battle of Bataan in World War II, to 1952, after he had been removed from his Korean War command by President Harry Truman for insubordination. It is recounted in flashback as MacArthur visits West Point in 1962.

== Cast ==
- Gregory Peck as General of the Army Douglas MacArthur
- Ed Flanders as President Harry S. Truman
- Dan O'Herlihy as President Franklin D. Roosevelt
- Ivan Bonar as Lieutenant General Richard K. Sutherland
- Ward Costello as General of the Army George C. Marshall
- Nicolas Coster as Colonel Sidney Huff
- Marj Dusay as Jean MacArthur
- Art Fleming as W. Averell Harriman
- Russell Johnson as Fleet Admiral Ernest J. King
- Sandy Kenyon as Lieutenant General Jonathan M. Wainwright
- Robert Mandan as Representative Joseph W. Martin Jr.
- Allan Miller as Colonel LeGrande A. Diller
- Dick O'Neill as Major General Courtney Whitney
- G. D. Spradlin as Major General Robert L. Eichelberger
- Addison Powell as Fleet Admiral Chester W. Nimitz
- Tom Rosqui as Major General Francis L. Sampson
- Kenneth Tobey as Fleet Admiral William F. "Bull" Halsey
- Charles Cyphers as Brigadier General Edwin F. Harding
- Garry Walberg as Lieutenant General Walton Walker
- Lane Allan as Major General William F. Marquat
- Barry Coe as Reporter
- Everett Cooper as General Walter Krueger
- Warde Donovan as General Lemuel C. Shepherd Jr.
- Philip Kenneally as Vice Admiral James H. Doyle
- John McKee as Fleet Admiral William D. Leahy
- Walter O. Miles as General George Kenney
- Gerald S. Peters as General Thomas Blamey
- Eugene Peterson as General J. Lawton Collins
- Alex Rodine as General Kuzma Derevyanko
- Yuki Shimoda as Prime Minister Kijūrō Shidehara
- Fred Stuthman as General Omar Bradley
- Harvey Vernon as Admiral Forrest Sherman
- William Wellman Jr. as Lieutenant John D. Bulkeley
- James Shigeta as General Tomoyuki Yamashita

== Production ==
Gregory Peck said, "I admit that I was not terribly happy with the script they gave me, or with the production they gave me which was mostly on the back lot of Universal. I thought they shortchanged the production." Parts of the film were shot at the beach near Camp Pendleton in San Diego County, California, and at San Diego's main passenger rail station, known locally as the Santa Fe Depot.

== Reception ==
MacArthur received mixed reviews, it currently holds a 50% rating on Rotten Tomatoes from 12 critics.

The film is recognized by American Film Institute in the following lists:

- 2003: AFI's 100 Years...100 Heroes & Villains:
  - General Douglas MacArthur – Nominated Hero

== See also ==
- Inchon, another film featuring MacArthur.
