= List of presidents of the Philippines by military service =

Of the 17 individuals who have served as president of the Philippines, only six had prior military service, while 11 had none.

The first Philippine president, Emilio Aguinaldo, holds the distinction of having attained the highest military rank prior to assuming the presidency, serving as generalissimo of the Philippine Revolutionary Army and later of the Philippine Republican Army.

The most recent president to have had previous military experience was Fidel V. Ramos, who served as a general of the Philippine Constabulary until 1988, when he was appointed Secretary of National Defense by then-president Corazon Aquino.

== List of presidents by military service ==
Name	Portrait	Rank	Branch	Year(s) served	Wartime service	Medals and decorations	Notes
Emilio Aguinaldo		Generalissimo	Philippine Revolutionary Army	1896–1901	Philippine Revolution, Philippine–American War		Became Commanding General of the entire Revolutionary Army after the assassination of Gen. Antonio Luna in June 1899
Manuel Quezon		Commandant	Philippine Republican Army	1899–1901	Philippine–American War		Served under Gen. Tomas Mascardo and also aide-de-camp to President Aguinaldo
Jose P. Laurel	—						
Sergio Osmeña	—						
Manuel Roxas		Brigadier General	Philippine Commonwealth Army	1941–1945	World War II		Covertly provided intelligence reports to guerilla units while acting as chief advisor to President Jose P. Laurel
Elpidio Quirino	—						
Ramon Magsaysay		Captain	Philippine Commonwealth Army	1942–1945	World War II		31st Infantry Division, present during the Battle of Bataan (1942). Later became Secretary of National Defense under President Elpidio Quirino
Carlos P. Garcia	—						
Diosdado Macapagal	—						
Ferdinand E. Marcos		1st Lieutenant	USAFFE	1942–1945	World War II		21st Infantry Division, present during the Battle of Bataan and the subsequent Death March (1942)
Ferdinand E. Marcos		Major	USAFIP-NL	1942–1945	World War II		14th Infantry Regiment
Corazon Aquino	—						
Fidel V. Ramos		General	Philippine Constabulary	1950–1988	Korean War, Vietnam War		Only president to have served as chief of staff of the Armed Forces (1984–1985; 1986–1988), and commander of a service branch (1972–1986)
Joseph Estrada	—						
Gloria Macapagal-Arroyo	—						
Benigno Aquino III	—						
Rodrigo Duterte	—						
Bongbong Marcos	—						
