= Japanese Instrument of Surrender =

1945 agreement ending World War II

Coordinates: 35°21′17″N 139°45′36″E

The capitulation of the state of Japan to the conditions provided by the Allies
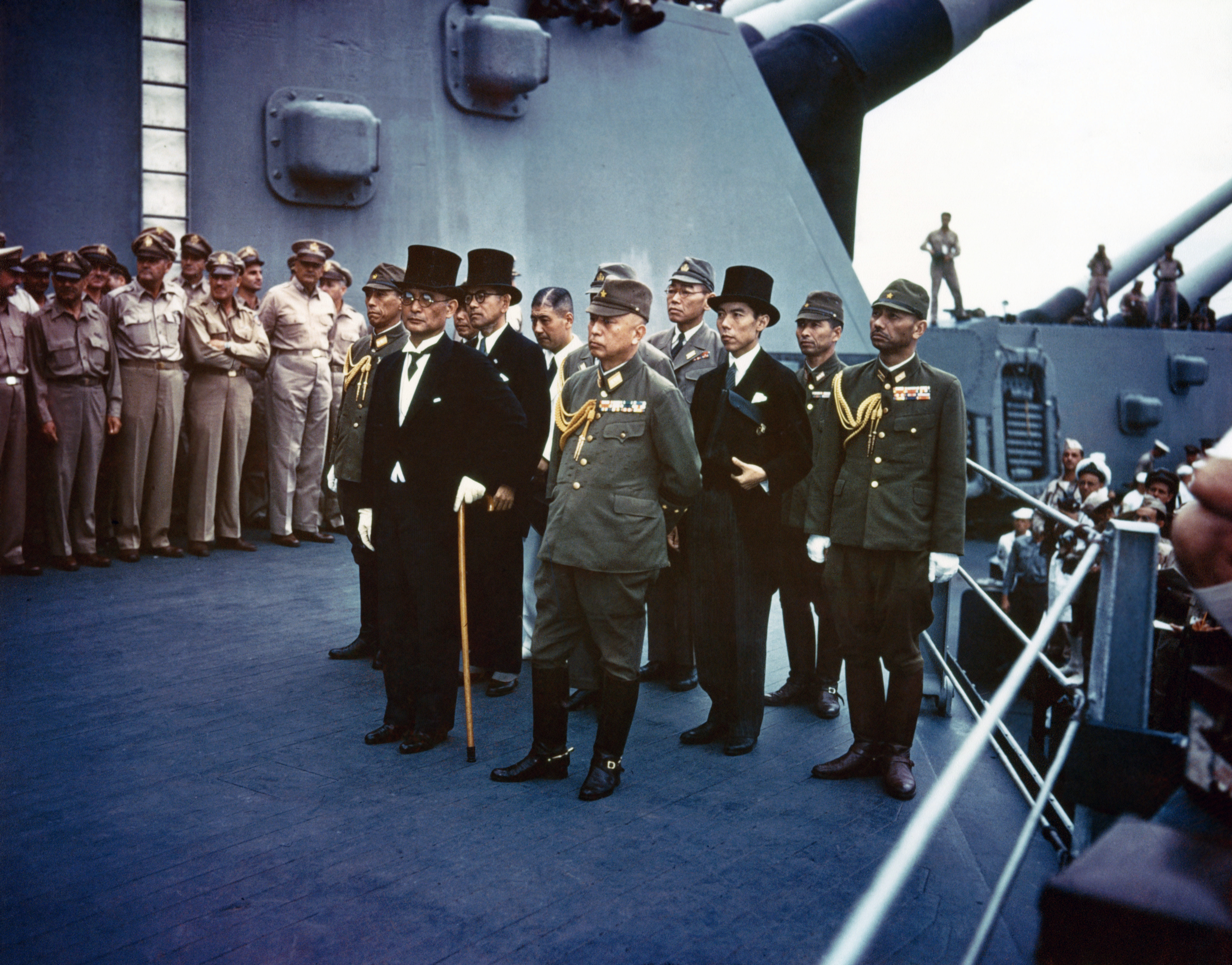
- Representatives of the Empire of Japan stand aboard USS Missouri prior to signing of the Instrument of Surrender.
- Type: Capitulation
- Signed: 2 September 1945; 81 years ago
- Location: Tokyo Bay, Japan
- Condition: Signed
- Parties: Japan; United States; China; United Kingdom; Soviet Union; Australia; Canada; France; Netherlands; New Zealand
- Ratifiers: (Empire of Japan) Government of Japan Allied Governments

Full text
- Japanese Instrument of Surrender at Wikisource

The Japanese Instrument of Surrender was the printed agreement that formalized the surrender of Japan, marking the end of hostilities in World War II. It was signed by representatives from Japan and from the Allied nations: the United States, China, the United Kingdom, the Soviet Union, Australia, Canada, France, the Netherlands, and New Zealand. The signing took place on the deck of USS Missouri in Tokyo Bay just after 09:00 Japan Standard Time (JST) and took effect at 09:25 JST on 2 September 1945.

The date is sometimes known as Victory over Japan Day. However, that designation more frequently refers to the date of Emperor Hirohito's Gyokuon-hōsō (Imperial Rescript of Surrender), the radio broadcast announcement of the acceptance of the terms of the Potsdam Declaration at noon Japan Standard Time on 15 August.

== Preparation ==
General Douglas MacArthur's staff, headed by Colonel LeGrande A. Diller, were tasked to prepare the draft of the Instrument of Surrender. This was a challenge given resources were limited in war-torn Manila. Nevertheless, an enterprising staff member found rare parchment in a basement of a monastery, and this was given to MacArthur's printer.

The UK invited governments of the British Dominions to send representatives to the ceremony as subordinates to its own. MacArthur supported the government of Australia's demand to attend and sign separately from the UK, although Australia objected to his recommendation that Canada, the Netherlands, and France also sign the document.

It was difficult for Japan's Higashikuni Cabinet to find delegates for their unpleasant task. Prime Minister Higashikuni, being of the Imperial family, could not go, and Prince Fumimaro Konoe refused to go; finally Mamoru Shigemitsu and Yoshijirō Umezu accepted the personal appeal of the Emperor to be the two signatories. There were nine other Japanese delegates, three each from the Army, Navy, and Foreign Ministry. All eleven names were submitted in advance to the Allies, but for security reasons, only the two signatories were revealed to the press, the morning of the signing. The eleven delegates left Tokyo by car early on 2 September, boarded the USS Lansdowne at Yokohama, and sailed out to the Missouri, anchored in Tokyo Bay.

In acknowledgment of the event's magnitude, the Japanese delegation arrived at the ceremony in formal attire: the civilian delegates wore morning dress, and the military delegates wore full dress uniforms. James L. Starnes, the Missouri's navigator, had been tasked with planning the ceremony's logistics and suggested that the Allied attendees do the same. However, this was overruled by Douglas MacArthur, who famously remarked that "we fought them in our khaki uniforms, and we’ll accept their surrender in our khaki uniforms." The result was a deliberately sharp contrast between the Japanese and Allied participants.

The ceremony's planning fell to the crew of the Missouri, which exhaustively rehearsed it in order to assure that all of the ceremony's participants (including the press) could fit on the signing deck. A few minutes before the arrival of the Japanese delegation on the deck, the designated signing table, a small mahogany piece supplied by the British delegation, was found to be too small to accommodate both copies of the Instrument of Surrender and switched out for a folding table from the ship's mess hall draped in a stained green tablecloth.

== Surrender ceremony ==
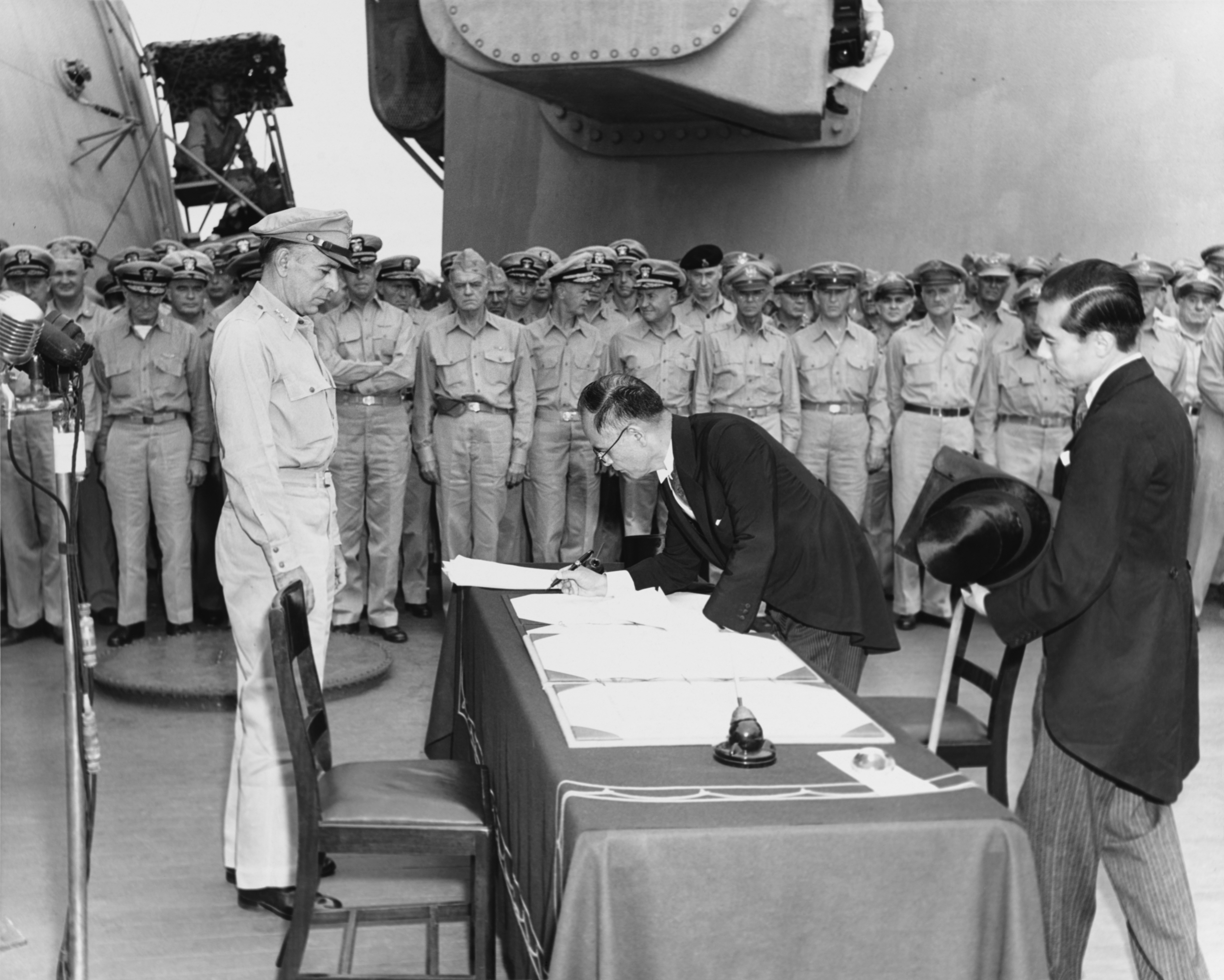
Japanese Foreign Minister Mamoru Shigemitsu signing the Instrument of Surrender on behalf of the Japanese Government, formally ending World War II. Standing behind the table is General Richard K. Sutherland.

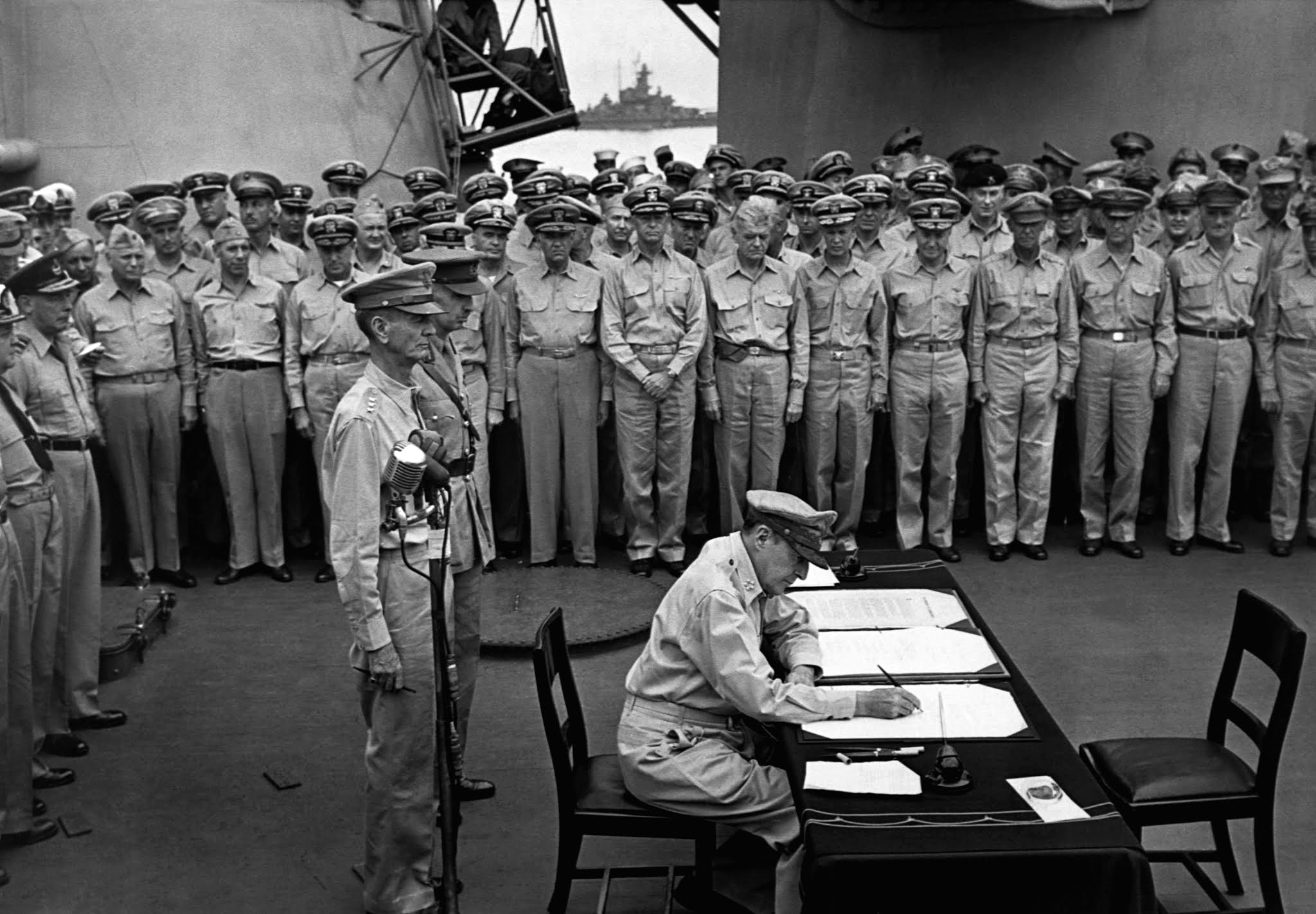
General of the Army Douglas MacArthur signing the Instrument of Surrender on behalf of the Allied Powers. Generals Wainwright and Percival, both former prisoners of the Japanese, stand behind him.

The ceremony aboard the deck of Missouri lasted 23 minutes and was broadcast throughout the world. The instrument was first signed by the Japanese foreign minister Mamoru Shigemitsu "By Command and in behalf of the Emperor of Japan and the Japanese Government" (9:04 a.m. JST). General Yoshijirō Umezu, Chief of the Army General Staff, then signed the document "By Command and in behalf of the Japanese Imperial General Headquarters" (9:06 a.m. JST). The Japanese representatives present for the signing were the following:

- Foreign Minister Mamoru Shigemitsu
- General Yoshijirō Umezu, Chief of the Army General Staff
- Major General Yatsuji Nagai
- Katsuo Okazaki (Foreign Ministry)
- Rear Admiral Sadatoshi Tomioka
- Toshikazu Kase (Foreign Ministry)
- Lieutenant General Suichi Miyakazi
- Rear Admiral Ichiro Yokoyama
- Saburo Ota (Foreign Ministry)
- Captain Katsuo Shiba (Navy)
- Colonel Kazushi Sugita

At 9:08 a.m., American General of the Army Douglas MacArthur, the Commander in the Southwest Pacific and Supreme Commander for the Allied Powers, accepted the surrender on behalf of the Allied Powers and signed in his capacity as Supreme Commander.

After MacArthur, the following representatives signed the instrument of surrender on behalf of each of the Allied Powers:

- Fleet Admiral Chester Nimitz for the United States (9:12 a.m.)
- General Hsu Yung-chang for China (9:13 a.m.)
- Admiral Sir Bruce Fraser for the United Kingdom (9:14 a.m.)
- Lieutenant General Kuzma Derevyanko for the Soviet Union (9:16 a.m.) (Note: The Soviet Union had only declared war on Japan a month earlier, after the Hiroshima bombing.)
- General Sir Thomas Blamey for Australia (9:17 a.m.)
- Colonel Lawrence Moore Cosgrave for Canada (9:18 a.m.)
- Général de Corps d'Armée Philippe Leclerc de Hauteclocque for France (9:20 a.m.)
- Lieutenant Admiral Conrad Helfrich for the Netherlands (9:21 a.m.)
- Air Vice-Marshal Leonard M. Isitt for New Zealand (9:22 a.m.)

After the signing concluded, MacArthur made a few concluding remarks and closed the proceedings. At 9:25 a.m. on 2 September 1945, the war was officially over.

== Flags at the ceremony ==
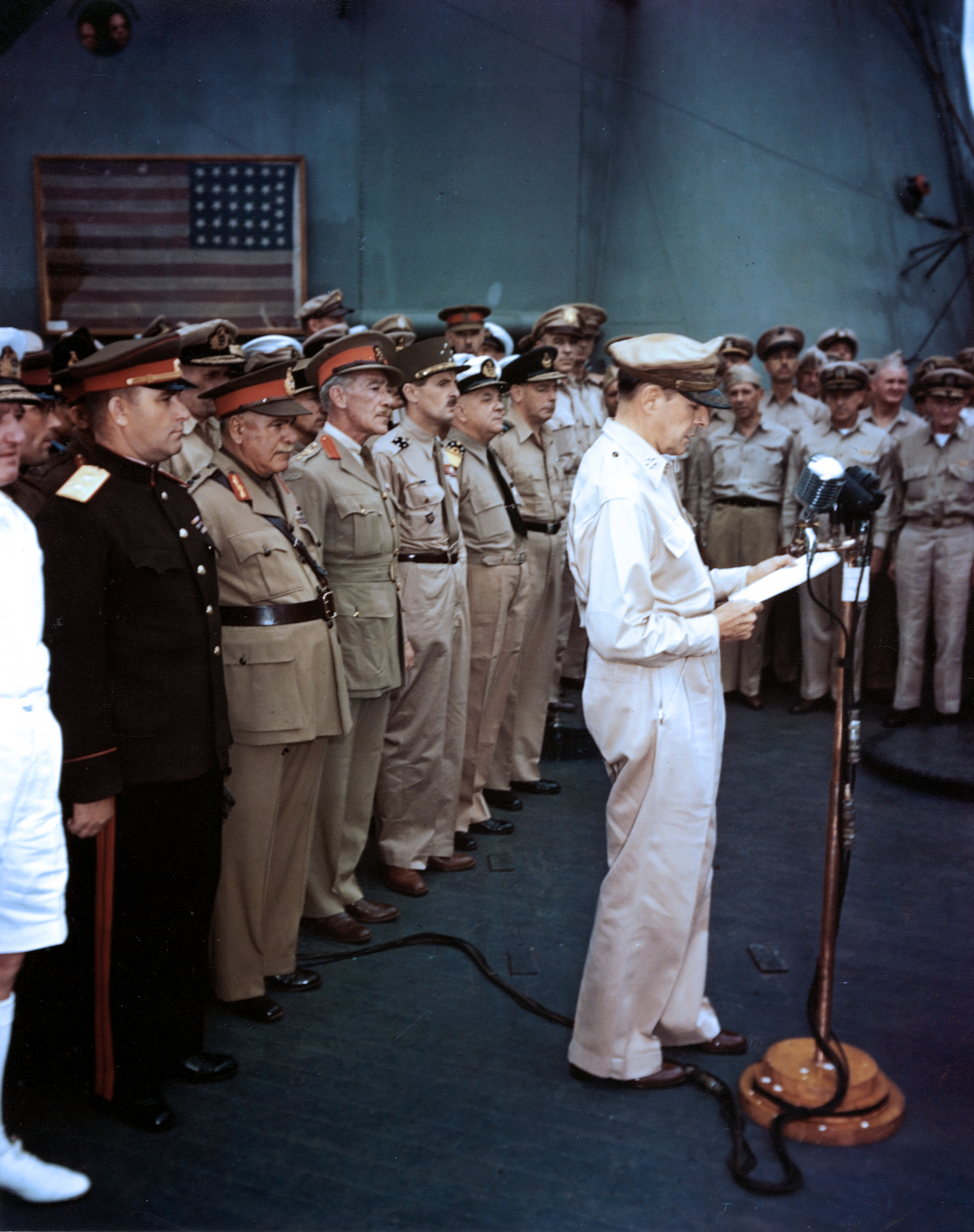
Commodore Perry's flag was flown from Annapolis, Maryland, to Tokyo for display at the surrender ceremonies which officially ended World War II.

The deck of the Missouri was furnished with two U.S. flags. A commonly heard story is that one of the flags had flown over the White House on the day Pearl Harbor was attacked. However, Captain Stuart Murray of USS Missouri explained:

At eight o'clock we had hoisted a clean set of colors at the mainmast and a clean jack of the United States at the bow as we were at anchor, and I would like to add that these were just regular ship's flags, GI issue, that we'd pulled out of the spares, nothing special about them, and they had never been used anywhere so far as we know, at least they were clean and we had probably gotten them in Guam in May. So there was nothing special about them. Some of the articles in the history say this was the same flag that was flown on the White House or the National Capitol on 7 December 1941, the attack on Pearl Harbor, and at Casablanca, and so forth, also MacArthur took it up to Tokyo and flew it over his headquarters there. The only thing I can say is they were hard up for baloney, because it was nothing like that. It was just a plain ordinary GI-issue flag and a Union Jack. We turned them both in to the Naval Academy Museum when we got back to the East Coast in October. The only special flag that was there was a flag which Commodore Perry had flown on his ship out in that same location 82 [recte 92] years before. It was flown out in its glass case from the Naval Academy Museum. An officer messenger brought it out. We put this hanging over the door of my cabin, facing forward, on the surrender deck so that everyone on the surrender deck could see it.

That special flag on the veranda deck of the Missouri had been flown from Commodore Matthew Perry's flagship in 1853–54 when he led the U.S. Navy's Far East Squadron into Tokyo Bay to force the opening of Japan's ports to foreign trade.

Photographs of the signing ceremony show that this flag is displayed backward—reverse side showing (stars in the upper right corner). This was because U.S. flags on the right of an object, plane, ship, or person have the stars on the upper right corner, to look like the flag is heading into battle—as if attached to a pole and someone is carrying it. Stars in the upper left of a flag displayed on the right side of the object could make the flag look like it were going away from battle. The cloth of the historic flag was so fragile that the conservator at the U.S. Naval Academy Museum directed that a protective backing be sewn on it, leaving its "wrong side" visible; and this was how Perry's 31-star flag was presented on this unique occasion.

A replica of this historic flag can be seen today on the Surrender Deck of the Battleship Missouri Memorial in Pearl Harbor. The original flag is still on display at the Naval Academy Museum, as are the table and tablecloth upon which the instrument of surrender was signed and the original bronze plaque marking the location of the signing (which was replaced by two replicas in 1990).

== Differences between versions ==
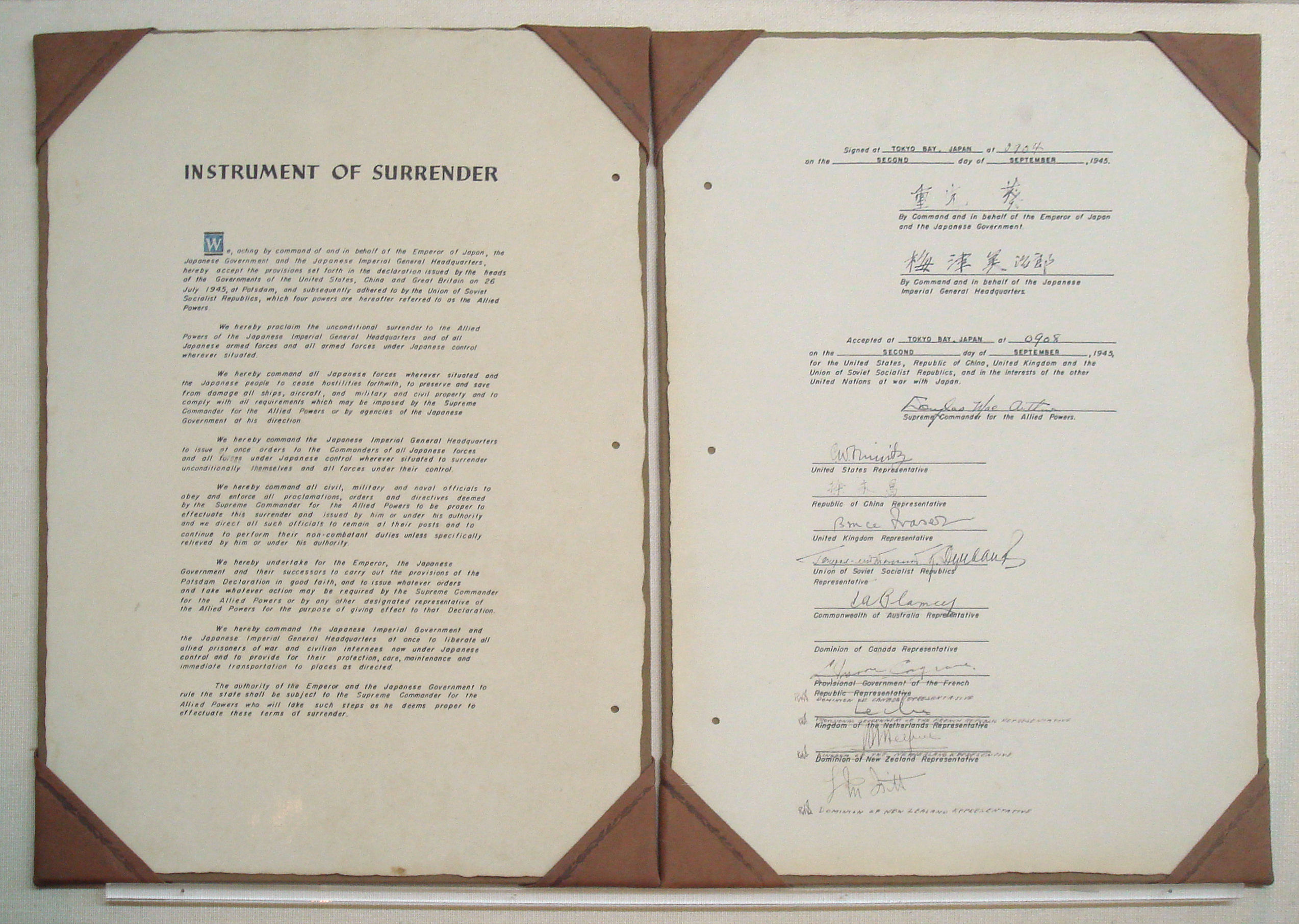
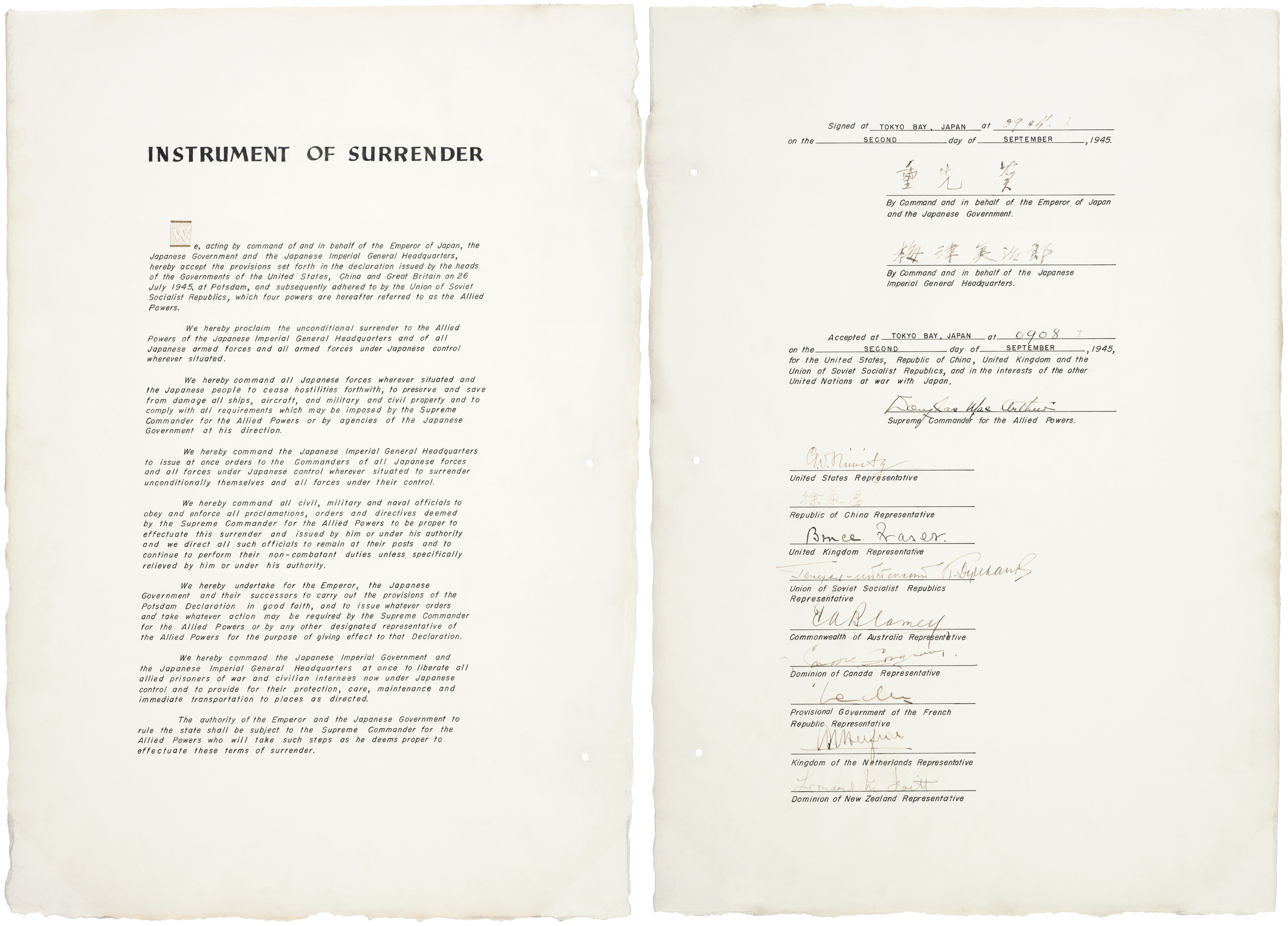
The Japanese and Allied copies of the Instrument of Surrender

The Japanese copy of the treaty varied from the Allied in one way. The Canadian representative, Colonel Lawrence Moore Cosgrave, signed below his line instead of above it on the Japanese copy, so everyone after him had to sign one line below the intended one. This was attributed to Cosgrave being blind in one eye from a World War I injury. When the discrepancy was pointed out to General Richard K. Sutherland, he crossed out the pre-printed name titles of the Allied nations and rewrote by hand the titles in their correct relative positions. The Japanese initially found this alteration unacceptable—until Sutherland initialed (as an abbreviated signature) each alteration. The Japanese representatives did not complain further.

== Archiving and artifacts ==
On 6 September, Colonel Bernard Theilen arrived in Washington, D.C. with the Allied copy of the Instrument and other documents, including a copy of Hirohito's 15 August rescript and the full powers credentials for Shigemitsu and Umezu, all three of which were stamped with the State Seal of Japan. He presented them to President Harry S. Truman in a formal White House ceremony the following day. Following a ceremony led by General Jonathan Wainwright, the documents were then exhibited at the National Archives, along with regional instruments of surrender signed after the Missouri ceremony, in the Philippines (September 3), in Korea (September 9), and in South-east Asia (September 12). On October 1, 1945, the documents were formally received (accessioned) into the holdings of the National Archives. They are now housed in the National Archives Building in Washington, D.C.

The Japanese copy of the Instrument is at the Diplomatic Archives of the Ministry of Foreign Affairs of Japan in Tokyo, and was last publicly displayed in 2015, as part of an exhibition marking the 70th anniversary of the signing. A replica version of the Japanese copy can be viewed at the archive's gallery, and at the Edo-Tokyo Museum in Tokyo.

MacArthur was instructed to make 11 full-sized watermarked facsimiles of the instrument for distribution among the Allied nations. These were bound in blue leather. MacArthur later ordered more copies, some bound in red leather for presentation to his personal guests at the ceremony; authorities differ on the number of the later copies, some of which were in smaller sizes with different watermark.

The Republic of China's facsimile is now in the National Museum of History in Taiwan, and (along with seven other historic documents) was designated as a National Treasure by the Ministry of Culture in 2016.

Two of the personal facsimiles, given to Colonel LeGrande A. Diller and Filipino Major General Basilio Valdes, were bought in the late 20th century by Kenneth W. Rendell for The International Museum of World War II in Natick, Massachusetts, whose collection was subsequently bought by Ronald Lauder.

=== Signing pens ===
As witnesses, American general Jonathan Wainwright, who had surrendered the Philippines, and British lieutenant-general Arthur Percival, who had surrendered Singapore, received two of the six pens used by MacArthur to sign the instrument. Wainwright's pen was donated to the West Point Museum at the United States Military Academy. Percival's pen was donated to the Cheshire Military Museum. The pen of MacArthur's aide Courtney Whitney was used by MacArthur and returned to him afterwards. The Whitney family still owns this pen. All of the pens used by MacArthur were black, except the last, which was bright red and went to his wife. A replica of the red pen, along with copies of the instrument of surrender, is in a case on Missouri by the plaque marking the signing spot. MacArthur left two black pens that he signed with on the table for others to also sign with if they desired. The British signatory, Admiral Bruce Fraser, also signed the instrument with these two black MacArthur pens but tried to copy MacArthur's gesture of giving pens to Wainwright and Percival by giving these pens to his two witnesses. After the ceremony, MacArthur's aides immediately retrieved these two pens from Fraser's witnesses and returned them to MacArthur. American General Jimmy Doolittle reportedly whispered to everyone around him, "I see the British are still lend-leasing our equipment." The MacArthur Memorial currently has these two black Waterman pens. The red Parker pen that was owned by MacArthur's wife was stolen from her later.

Nimitz signed the instrument with two pens. One of these pens, which belonged to his Chinese neighbor and close friend, is now in the Nanjing Museum in Nanjing, China. The other one is now in the United States Naval Academy Museum.

== Gallery ==
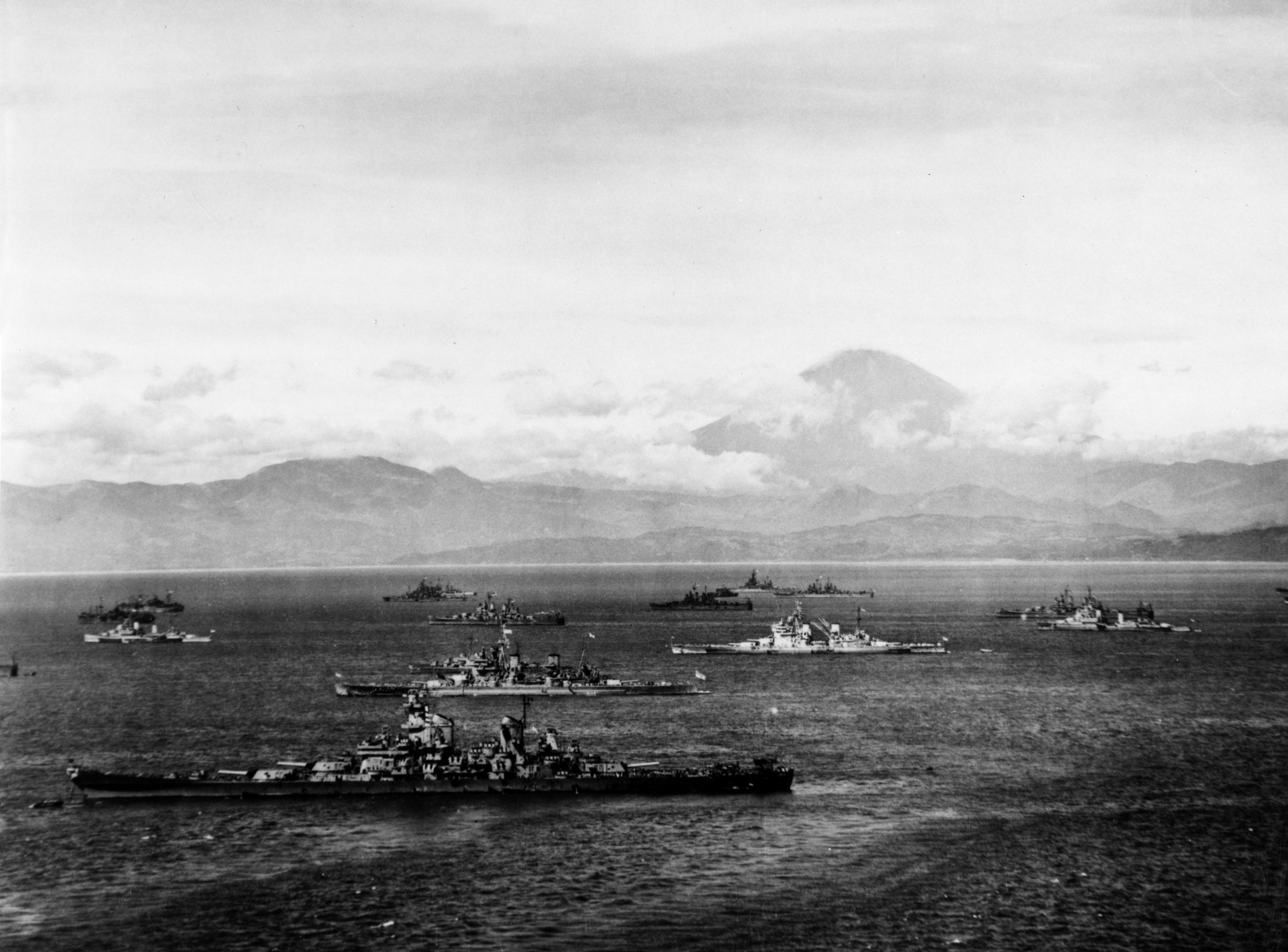
Ships of U.S. Third Fleet and British Pacific Fleet in Sagami Bay, 28 August 1945, preparing for the formal Japanese surrender. Nearest ship is USS Missouri. HMS Duke of York is just beyond, with HMS King George V further in. USS Colorado is in far center distance. Mount Fuji is in the background.

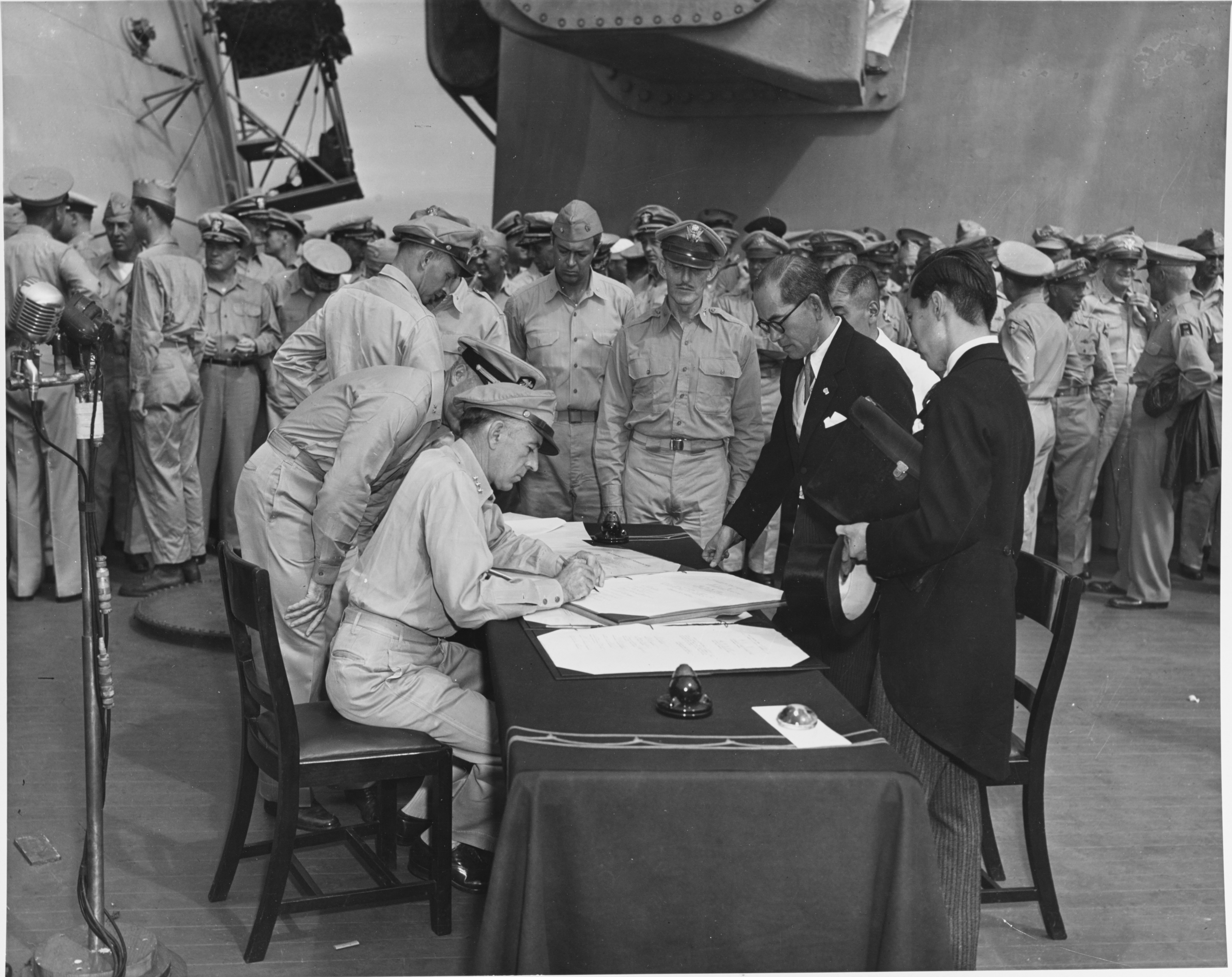
Lieutenant General Richard K. Sutherland, aboard USS Missouri, corrects a signatory error in the Japanese Instrument of Surrender. US Colonel Sidney Mashbir and Japanese Foreign Minister Katsuo Okazaki look on.

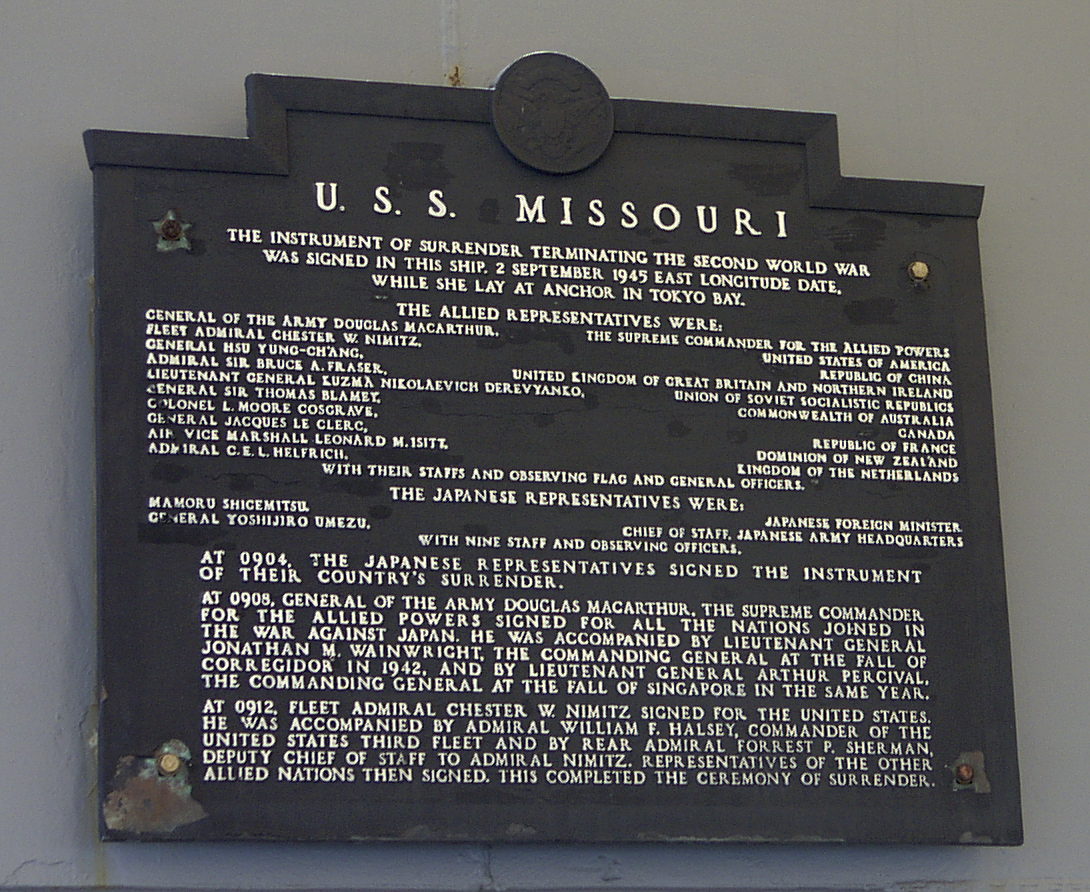
Plaque over the door to the Captain's Cabin on board the Missouri marking the signing.

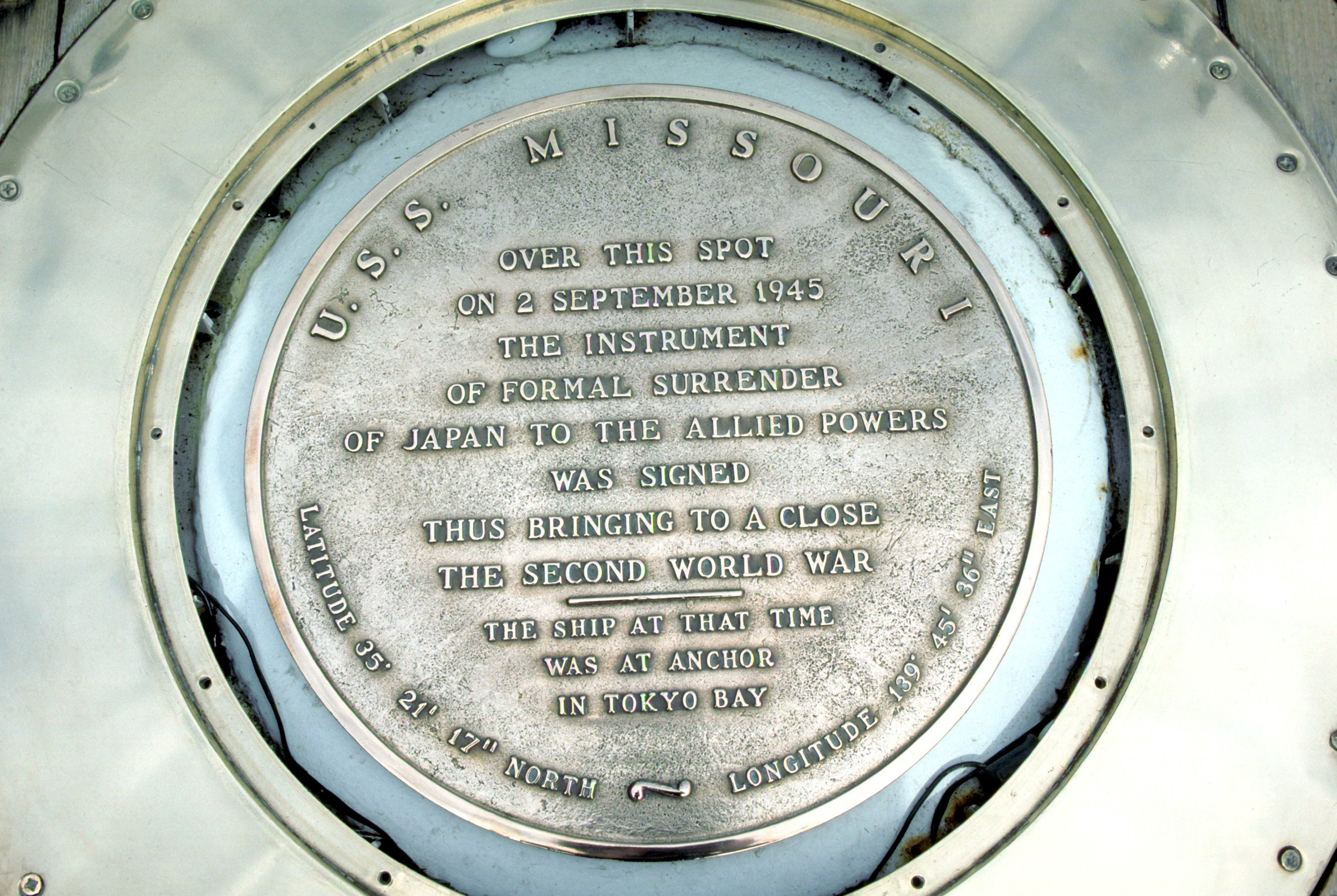
Plaque in the deck of the Missouri marking the location of the signing.

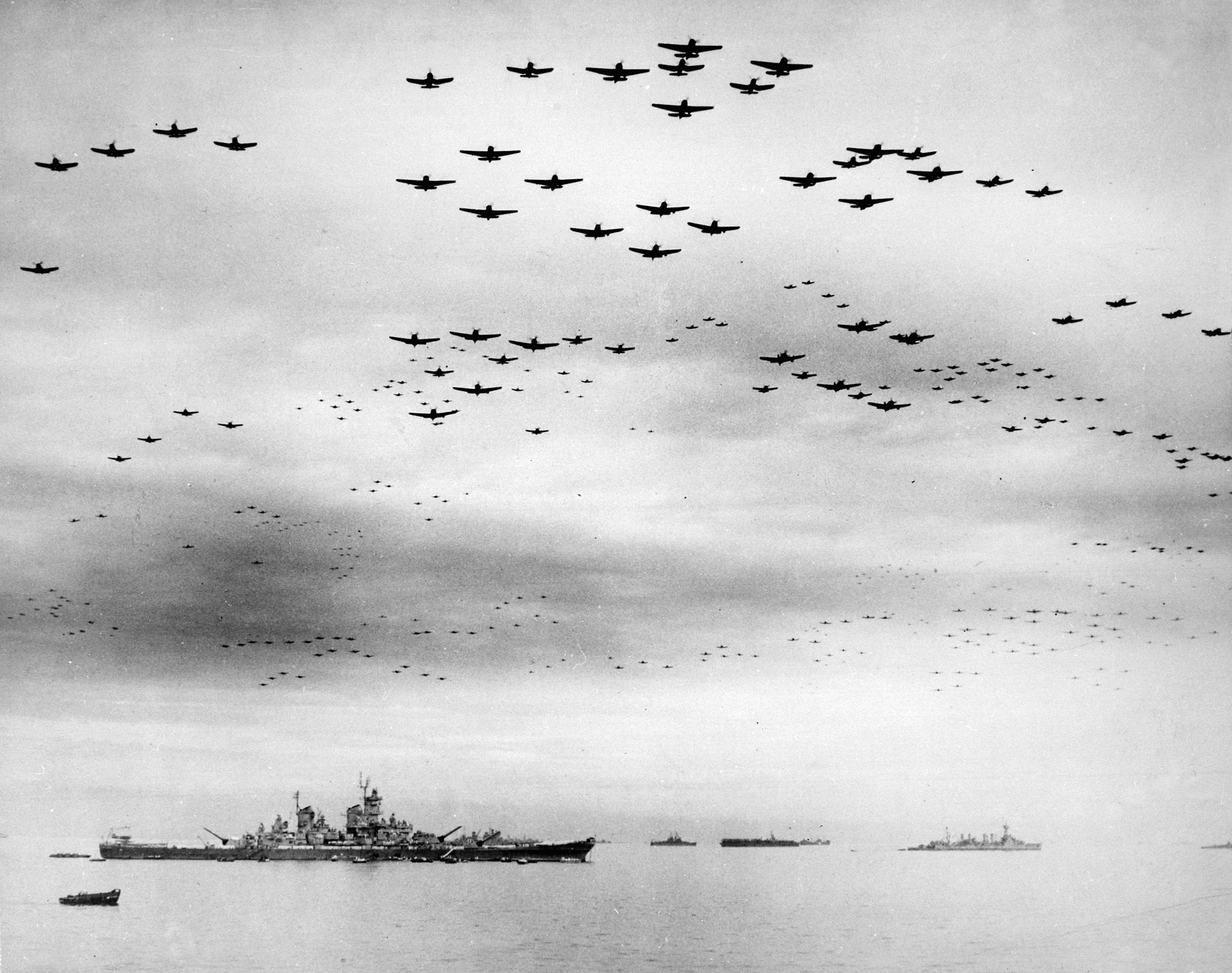
A large formation of American planes over USS Missouri and Tokyo Bay celebrating the signing, 2 September 1945.

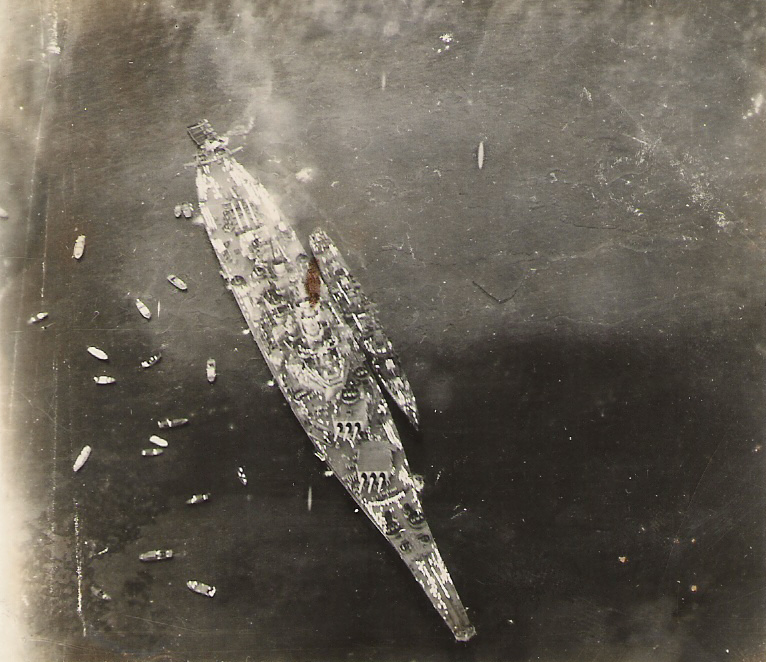
Photo taken from an airplane flying over USS Missouri. USS Buchanan is alongside.

== See also ==
- Cairo Declaration (1943)
- General Order No. 1 (Aug. 1945)
- Surrender ceremony of the Second Sino-Japanese War (Sep. 1945)
- Retrocession of Taiwan (Oct. 1945)
- List of Allied ships at the Japanese surrender

=== Post-war ===
- Occupation of Japan
- Japanese holdouts
- Treaty of San Francisco (1951)
- Treaty of Taipei (1952)
- Soviet–Japanese Joint Declaration of 1956
- Japan–China Joint Communiqué (1972)

=== Other Axis ===
- German Instrument of Surrender (1945)
- Armistice of Cassibile
- Armistice of Malta (1943)
- Treaty of Peace with Italy, 1947

== Sources ==
- Kase, Toshikazu (1950). Journey To The Missouri. Yale University Press.
- National Archives (1945). The End of the War in the Pacific: Surrender Documents in Facsimile. National Archives Publication. Vol. 46–6. Washington DC: Government Printing Office.
