= LeGrande A. Diller =

US Army officer (1901–1987)

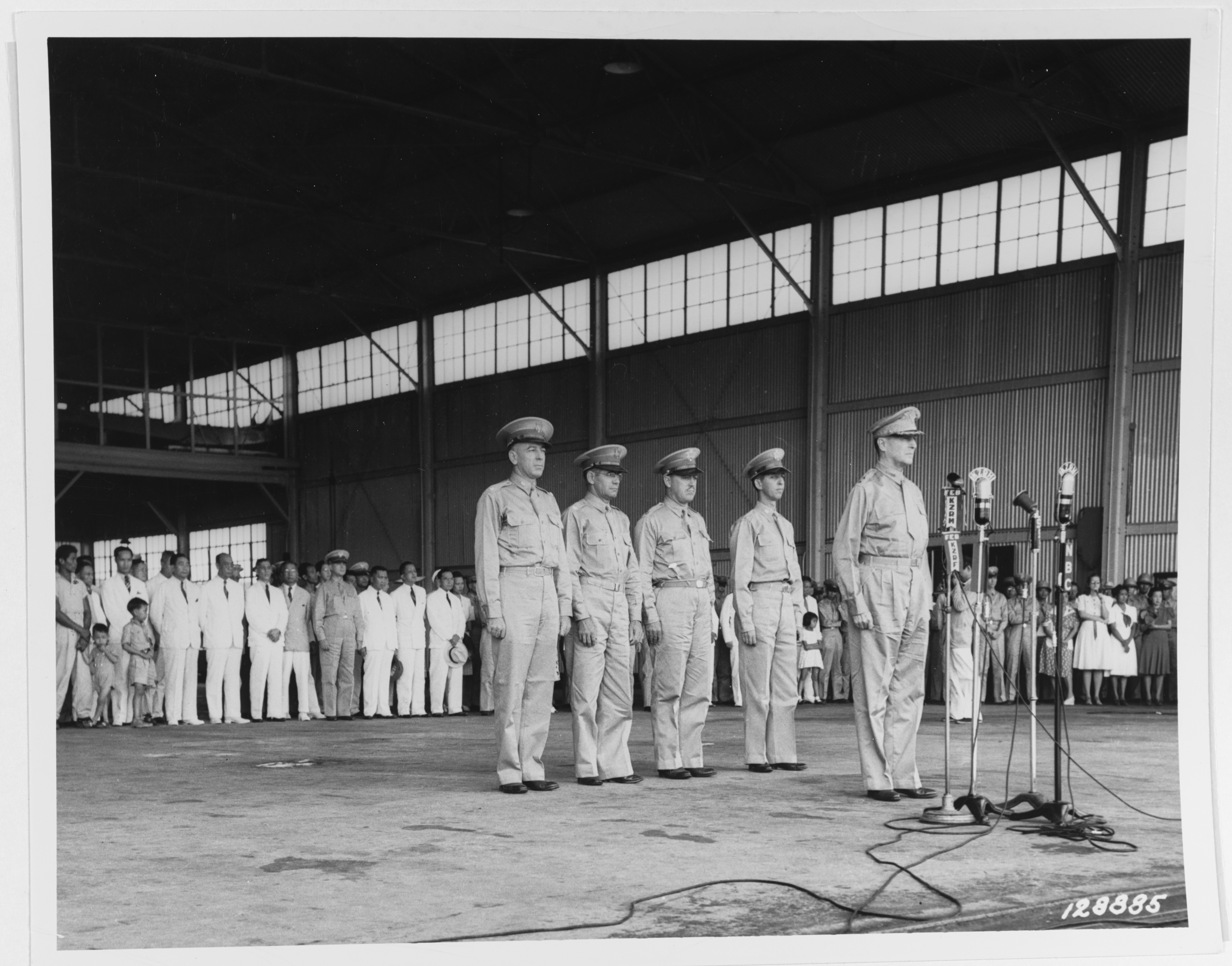
- Ceremony at Camp Murphy, 15 August 1941, marking the induction of the Philippine Army Air Corps. Behind MacArthur, from left to right, are Lieutenant Colonel Richard K. Sutherland, Colonel Harold H. George, Lieutenant Colonel William F. Marquat, and Major LeGrande A. Diller.
- Born: February 16, 1901; Erie County, New York, U.S.
- Died: 2 September 1987 (aged 86); Reynolds, Georgia, U.S.
- Military career
- Allegiance: United States of America
- Branch: United States Army
- Service years: 1923–1954
- Rank: Brigadier General
- Service number: 0-15078
- Commands: 22nd Infantry Regiment
- Conflicts: World War II
- Awards: Army Distinguished Service Medal; Silver Star; Legion of Merit

Brigadier General LeGrande Albert "Pick" Diller (16 February 1901 – 2 September 1987) was a United States Army officer during World War II. He served as General of the Army Douglas MacArthur's Aide-de-camp in the South West Pacific Area during the war.

== Early life ==
Born in Tonawanda, Erie County, New York, he had two brothers Everell (who retired as an army colonel), Thurlow Diller and two sisters.

== Military career ==
Diller was commissioned as a 2nd Lieutenant of Infantry in the Regular Army on February 19, 1923, and he graduated Syracuse University in 1924 with a Bachelor of Science degree in chemical engineering. He was promoted to 1st lieutenant in 1927 and graduated from the Infantry School Company Officers Course in 1928. He was promoted to captain in August 1935 and graduated from the Command and General Staff School in 1937. Transferred to Philippines in 1939, he was promoted on July 1, 1940, to major.

In 1941, he became one of General Douglas MacArthur's personal Aides and on December 19, 1941, he received a promotion to the temporary rank of lieutenant colonel in the Army of the United States. He would handle MacArthur's public relations and maintain his public image. He would flee with MacArthur from the Philippines in four PT boats with MacArthur in PT-41 and Diller in PT-35. In March 1942, he was promoted to colonel and was transferred to the General Staff Corps on October 17, 1942. He remained with MacArthur during the war, receiving a promotion to brigadier general on January 9, 1945. He was the lead US Army representative on the committee that arranged the formal Japanese surrender aboard the battleship USS Missouri in Tokyo Harbor on September 2, 1945.

Following the war, Diller worked under MacArthur serving as Secretary of the Army general staff in Tokyo. Thereafter from 1947 to 1954, reverting to the Regular Army rank of colonel, Diller commanded infantry regiments in West Germany including 22nd Infantry Regiment. He retired from the army in 1954 with the rank of brigadier general.

== Later life ==
Following his retirement he served in the board of directors of Ringling School of Art. He died of cancer in Georgia in 1987.

== Family ==
He was married Harriett "Hat", who died in 1986, after which he married his second wife, Mary, in July 1987. He had one son, Richard W. Diller, who retired from the Army as a colonel.

== In popular culture ==
Diller was portrayed by actor Allan Miller in the 1977 film MacArthur.
