= Xu Yongchang =

Chinese general and politician (1885–1959)

- 徐永昌
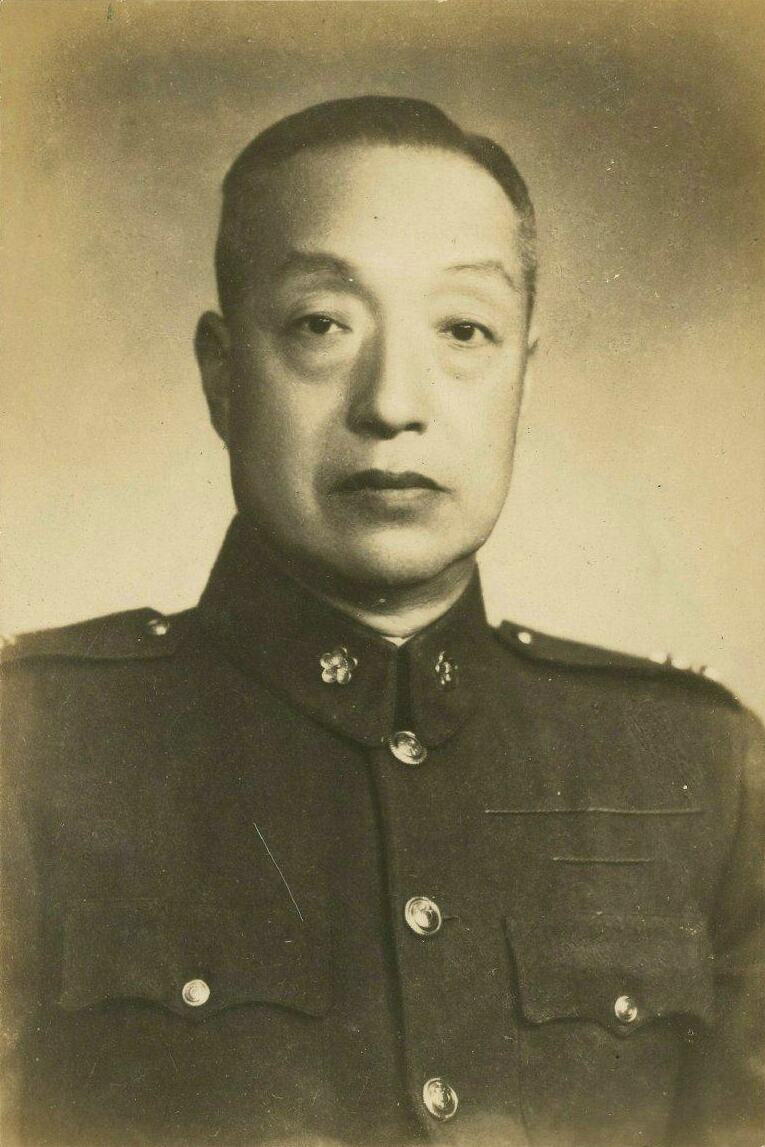
- Born: December 15, 1885; Yuanping, Shanxi, Qing dynasty
- Died: 12 July 1959 (aged 73); Taipei, Taiwan
- Military career
- Allegiance: Republic of China
- Branch: (Republic of China (1912–1949)) National Revolutionary Army
- Service years: 1909–1959
- Rank: General
- Unit: Shanxi clique
- Commands: First War Zone
- Conflicts: Northern Expedition; Central Plains War; Second Sino-Japanese War; Chinese Civil War
- Awards: Order of Blue Sky and White Sun
- Other work: government advisor

General Xu Yongchang (15 December 1885 – 12 July 1959) (Hsu Yung-chang; Chinese: 徐永昌; pinyin: Xú Yǒngchāng; Wade–Giles: Hsu^{²} Yung^{³}-ch'ang^{¹}; style name: Cichen (Tzu-chen)) was the Minister of Board of Military Operations of the Republic of China between December 22, 1948, and April 22, 1949, and the representative of the Republic of China on September 2, 1945, at the signing of the Instrument of Surrender of Japan that ended World War II.

Xu Yongchang graduated from the Beijing Military Institute and later became the General Commander of the 3rd Army under Feng Yuxiang and the 20th Route Jin Army under Yan Xishan. He was the Chairman of Shanxi province at the time of Mukden Incident, and served in the National Revolutionary Army as the Chief Operations Supreme Staff.

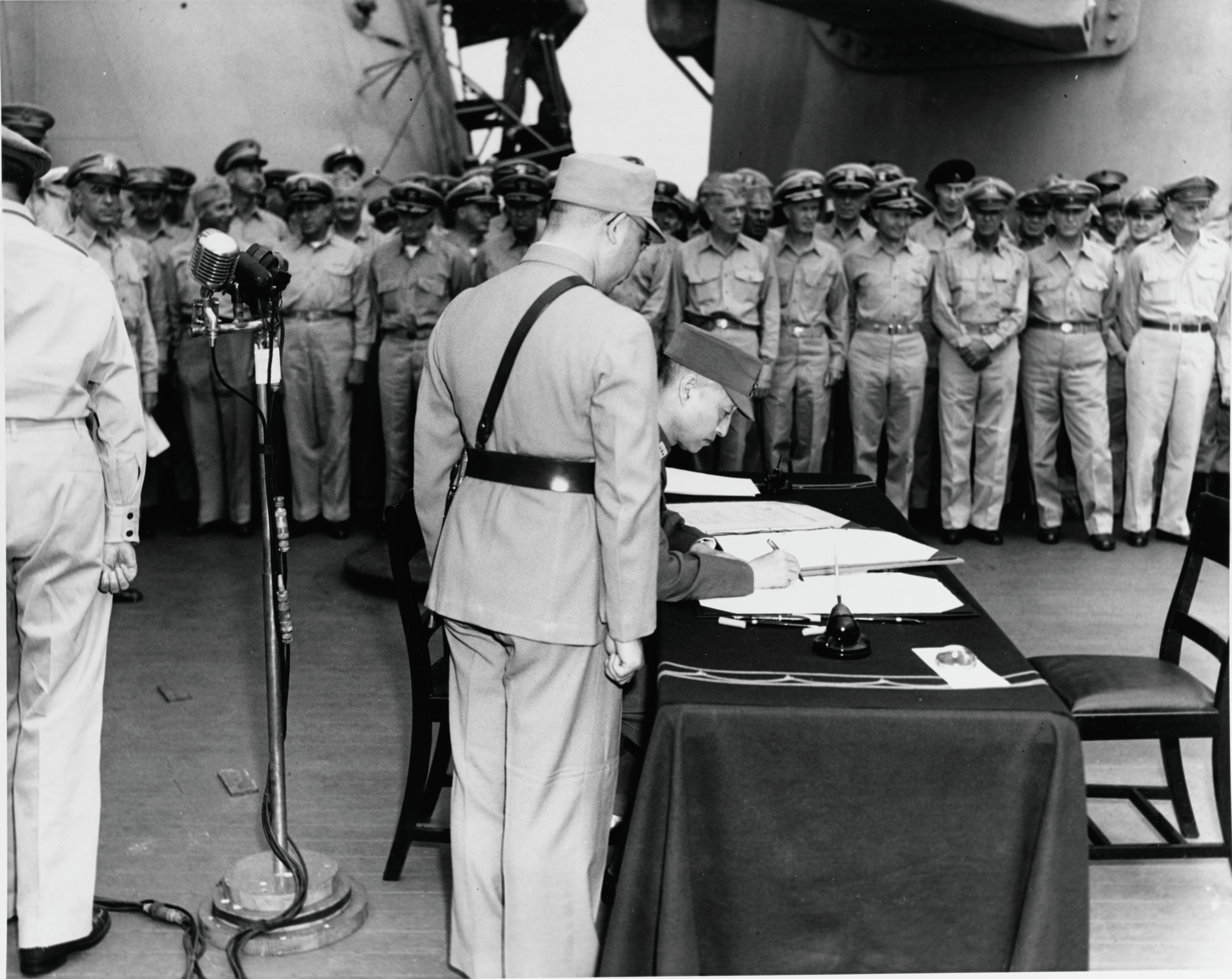
Tokyo Bay, Japan -- Surrender of Japanese aboard USS "Missouri". Xu Yongchang, representing China, signs the instrument of surrender. Douglas MacArthur, Allied Supreme Commander, watches; another Chinese representative Wang Zhi (zh:王之) observes as he stands with his back to the camera.

After the Second Sino-Japanese War, he was the president of the Beijing Military Institute and the Minister of Defence. He represented China at the Japanese Instrument of Surrender. He went to Taiwan after the Chinese Civil War, served as a senior advisor to the Office of the President and a member of Central Review Committee, and died in 1959.

Xu Yongchang's diary was published by the Academia Sinica's Institute of Modern History in 1989.

== See also ==
- History of the Republic of China
- Sino-Japanese War (1937-1945)
