= Office of the Military Advisor to the Commonwealth Government of the Philippines =

National defense body created in 1935

Office of the Military Advisor to the Commonwealth Government
- Term length: No fixed term
- Formation: 1935
- First holder: Douglas MacArthur
- Final holder: Douglas MacArthur
- Abolished: 1941

The Office of the Military Advisor to the Commonwealth Government (OMACG) was created in 1935 upon the initiative of President Manuel L. Quezon by the Philippine and American governments for the purposes of developing a system of national defense for the Commonwealth of the Philippines by 1946. OMACG's recommendations were adopted by the Philippine National Assembly in Commonwealth Act Number 1, the National Defense Act of 1935.

The Military Advisor to the Commonwealth Government was U.S. Major General Douglas MacArthur, (Note: In 1935, MacArthur completed 5 years as a full 4-star general assigned as the US Army Chief of Staff. He did not subsequently retire, and was not appointed to another 3-star or 4-star assignment, so he reverted to his permanent grade of major general (2-stars) upon accepting assignment as the Military Advisor to the Commonwealth Government in 1935. He subsequently retired from active service in the US Army in 1937, but remained in the Philippines as an advisor to the President of the Philippines, Manuel Quezon, until July 1941, when MacArthur was recalled to active service and reappointed to the permanent rank of major general for one day, and then appointed to lieutenant general the following day, and on 20 December 1941, he was reappointed to 4-stars as a full general. In December 1944, he was appointed to the temporary rank of 5-star General of the Army, which was made permanent in 1946, and as such he then remained on active duty for the remainder of his life, with full pay and allowances.) who was assisted by Major Dwight Eisenhower and Major James Ord; along with four officers from the Philippine Department, under Major General Lucius Holbrook (1936–1938) and Major General Grunert (1940–1941), and retired Lieutenant Colonel Sidney L. Huff. and Major Fredreich Walter Seefeld ( U.S. Army Retired)

OMACG produced a plan calling for a gradual 10-year build up so that the Philippines would have small regular and reserve armies, an air force, and a fleet of torpedo boats (the Offshore Patrol). The tactical organization of this army was based on divisions of ~7,500 troops.

== War Plans and Seacoast Defenses ==
The office drew up defense plans for the islands of Luzon, Cebu, Negros, Panay, Leyte, Mindanao, Bohol, Mindoro, and many of the smaller islands. The plans included the establishment of seacoast defenses along the seven straits which give access to the inland waters of the Philippines.

These plans did not involve the use of US forces, but were intended for use by district military commanders of the Philippine Army which was to be created under the National Defense Act.

The seacoast defenses were to consist of heavy coastal guns. These defenses were scheduled to be completed in April 1942. The War Department, at some time or other, had sent twenty-four 155 mm guns, without fire control equipment. Later, while assigned to USAFFE, MacArthur asked for four 12 inch, four 8 inch, and 22 additional 155 mm guns, as well as 30 searchlights. This request was received in December, too late to be acted upon before Japanese offensive actions in 1941.

== Staff Changes ==
Upon the accidental death of Lieutenant Colonel Ord, in January 1938, Major Sutherland was brought in as his replacement. Lieutenant Colonel Eisenhower left in December 1939 and was replaced by Lieutenant Colonel Marshall. In October 1937, Captain Casey joined the group as an engineering advisor, and later Major Marquat was appointed as an antiaircraft advisor. These men would stay with MacArthur throughout the war.

== MacArthur's Point Of View ==
MacArthur argues, "A small fleet will have distinct effect in compelling any hostile force to approach cautiously. The only naval task is that of inshore defense. This will be provided by flotillas of fast torpedo boats, supported by an air force."

MacArthur adds, "These islands have enormous defensive advantages. Luzon has only 2 areas where a hostile army could land. Each of these positions is broken by strong defensive positions.

MacArthur continues, "When developed the Philippine Army will be strong enough to oppose any conceivable expeditionary force. By 1946, the Islands will be in a favorable posture of defensive security."

== See also ==
- Military History of the Philippines
- Military History of the United States
- World War II
  - Pacific Theater
