= Field Marshal (Philippines) =

Defunct rank in the Philippine Army

Field Marshal of the Philippines
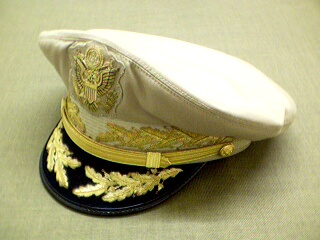
- A replica of Douglas MacArthur's Field Marshal cap
- Country: Philippines
- Service branch: Philippine Army
- Formation: 1936
- Abolished: 1946
- Next higher rank: None
- Next lower rank: General

Field Marshal of the Philippines was a rank created in 1936 to be held by Douglas MacArthur.

== Douglas MacArthur ==
US Army General Douglas MacArthur was the first and only Field marshal in the history of the Philippine Army, a position he held while also acting as the Military Advisor to the Commonwealth Government of the Philippines with a rank of major general. President Quezon conferred the rank of field marshal on 24 August 1936 and MacArthur's duty included the supervision of the creation of the Philippine nation-state.

MacArthur was accorded the rank as Military Advisor to the Commonwealth Government of the Philippines, which retained his services to form an army in response to the growing danger from Japan and the increasing likelihood of war in the Pacific.

MacArthur retired from the United States Army as a major-general, having previously served as a full general while Chief of Staff of the United States Army. President Manuel L. Quezon then hired him as a military advisor and commissioned him a Field Marshal in the Philippine Army, a rank which had not previously existed. (MacArthur's wife found the situation amusing and often remarked that MacArthur had gone from holding the highest rank in the United States Army to holding the highest rank in a non-existent army.)

President Quezon officially conferred the title of Field Marshal on MacArthur in a ceremony at Malacañan Palace on August 24, 1936. He was presented at that time with a gold baton and a unique uniform. Although unofficially considered as the five-star rank in the Armed Forces of the Philippines, MacArthur wore no special insignia as Field Marshal of the Philippines, except for a modification to his army officer's cap. To the standard gold-trimmed visor of a United States general's cap, MacArthur added gilt trim to the front body of the cap, above the visor. MacArthur referred to this modified headdress as his "Philippine Field Marshal's cap" and wore it for the duration of World War II and into the Korean War. However, the modified army headdress was against regulations, and MacArthur never officially obtained permission to wear this as a part of his uniform.

On December 31, 1937, MacArthur first retired from the U.S. Army and the Philippine Army. He ceased to represent the United States as military adviser to the government but remained in the Philippines as Quezon's adviser in a civilian capacity.

In July 1941, MacArthur was recalled to active duty as Supreme Allied Commander South West Pacific Area. For the duration of the war he continued to wear the "Field Marshal's cap".

== Emilio Aguinaldo ==
Emilio Aguinaldo, the first President of the Philippines, held an equivalent rank of five-star general under the title "Generalissimo" and "Minister Marshal" as the first Commander-in-Chief of the AFP.

Generalissimo
Ministro Mariskal
Philippine Revolutionary Army

After 1946, the rank of Field Marshal disappeared from the Philippine military and today is obsolete (the highest rank now obtainable is that of four-star general). In theory, the rank could again be conferred, but this would only be in the event of the Philippines' entering into a major war.
