= William F. Marquat =

United States Army general

William Frederic Marquat
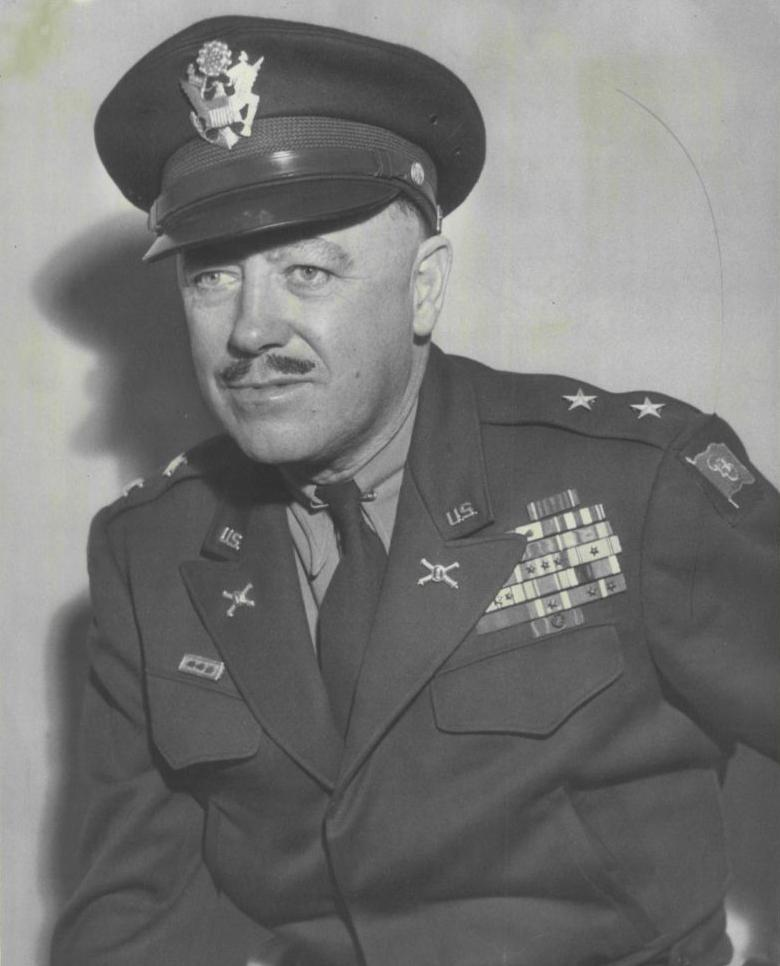
- William F. Marquat as a major general
- Born: March 17, 1894; St. Louis, Missouri
- Died: May 29, 1960 (aged 66); Washington, D.C.
- Burial place: Arlington National Cemetery
- Military career
- Allegiance: United States of America
- Branch: Washington National Guard; United States Army
- Service years: 1916–1955
- Rank: Major General
- Conflicts: World War I World War II; Korean War
- Awards: Distinguished Service Cross; Distinguished Service Medal (3); Silver Star (2); Air Medal

William Frederic Marquat (March 17, 1894 – May 29, 1960) was a major general in the US Army. Prior to his service in the military, Marquat was a reporter for The Seattle Times. Prior to the Japanese invasion of 1941, Marquat served with the Office of the Military Advisor to the Commonwealth Government of the Philippines, as the chief engineering advisor.

== Early life ==
Marquat was born on March 17, 1894, in St. Louis, Missouri to William and Sara (Layden) Marquat. He moved to the state of Washington and was commissioned as a second lieutenant in the Washington National Guard Coast Artillery Corps in October 1916. Marquat was called to federal service for World War I in July 1917 and served as a temporary captain from October 1918 to July 1919. After the war, he returned to The Seattle Times as automobile editor. Marquat accepted a commission as a captain in the Regular Army in September 1920.

== Later life ==
Marquat and his wife Eula lived in Washington, D.C. after his retirement. He suffered a stroke in 1959. Marquat died on May 29, 1960, at 3:00 am at Walter Reed Hospital. He was interred at Arlington National Cemetery three days later.

== Marquat library ==
The Marquat Library was formed in 1969 at the US Army Civil Affairs School in Fort Gordon, Georgia. The library was moved in 1973 when the school moved to Fort Bragg, North Carolina.

== Military career timeline ==
=== Military Timeline ===
- World War I: Coast Artillery Office
- Post World War I
  - 1932–1933: Student officer at Command and General Staff School
- World War II
  - Staff officer to General MacArthur
  - Commander of the 14th Antiaircraft Command
- Post World War II
  - Chair of the Allied Council for Japan
  - 1945–1952: Head of the Economics and Science Section General Headquarters for the Supreme Allied Powers - Tokyo, Japan
  - 1952–1955: Chief of Civil Affairs and Military Government
  - 1955: retires

== Awards ==
- Distinguished Service Cross - for actions during World War II
- Army Distinguished Service Medals - for actions during World War II (2x)
- Army Distinguished Service Medal - for actions during the Cold War
- Silver Star - for actions during World War II
- Silver Star - for actions during the Korean War
- Air Medal - for actions during World War II

=== Citation ===
Following the restoration of the capital of the Republic of Korea to its president and before the Seoul area was free of enemy activity, General Marquat toured the region by vehicle to obtain first-hand information vital to planning effective anti-aircraft installations necessary to forestall surprise enemy air attacks. Later, in anticipation of increased enemy air activity, General Marquat traveled over terrain with potential sniper fire and land mines to inspect anti-aircraft installations. His personal concern for his troops, actions in ground surveillance, and presence in the forward areas inspired his units to a high degree of efficiency and contributed materially to the United Nations effort in Korea. General Marquat's courage and devotion to duty as a leader upholds the traditions of the military service.

== See also ==
- Douglas MacArthur's escape from the Philippines
- M-Fund "M資金"
- Yamashita's gold
