= Richard K. Sutherland =

United States Army general (1893–1966)

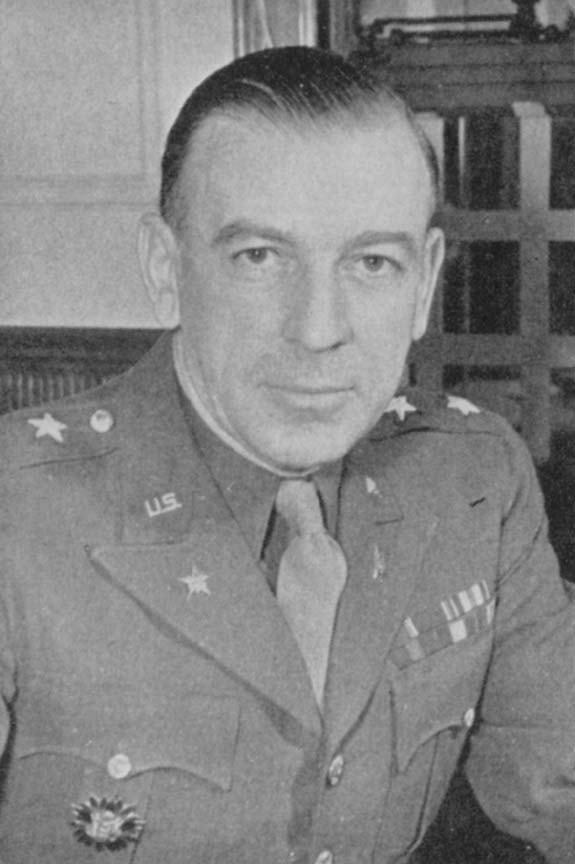
- Born: Richard Kerens Sutherland; 27 November 1893; Hancock, Maryland, U.S.
- Died: 25 June 1966 (aged 72); Washington, D.C., U.S.
- Burial place: Arlington National Cemetery, Arlington County, Virginia, U.S.
- Relatives: Howard Sutherland (father)
- Military career
- Allegiance: United States of America
- Branch: United States Army
- Service years: 1916–1946
- Rank: Lieutenant general
- Service number: 0-4623
- Units: Field Artillery Branch; Infantry Branch
- Conflicts: Pancho Villa Expedition; World War I World War II
- Awards: Distinguished Service Cross (2); Army Distinguished Service Medal (2); Silver Star (2)

Lieutenant General Richard Kerens Sutherland (27 November 1893 – 25 June 1966) was a United States Army officer during World War II. He served as General of the Army Douglas MacArthur's Chief of Staff in the South West Pacific Area during the war.

== Early life and education ==
Sutherland was born in Hancock, Maryland, on 27 November 1893, the only son among the six children of Howard Sutherland, who later became a US Senator from West Virginia, and Effie Harris Sutherland. Sutherland was raised and spent his adolescence and early adulthood in Elkins, West Virginia.

Sutherland was educated at Davis and Elkins College, Phillips Academy, from which he graduated in 1911, and Yale University, graduating with a Bachelor of Arts in 1916.

While at Yale, Sutherland joined ROTC. In July 1916, he enlisted as a private in the Connecticut National Guard.

== Career ==
=== First World War ===
Later that year, the National Guard was federalized and Sutherland served on the Mexican border during the Pancho Villa Expedition. The future general soon accepted a National Guard commission as a second lieutenant in the field artillery in August 1916. In December 1916, he transferred to the Regular Army with a commission as a first lieutenant in the Infantry branch. Sutherland was promoted to captain in 1917.

He served with the 2nd Division on the Western Front during World War I. Sutherland was a student at a tank school in England.

=== Between the wars ===
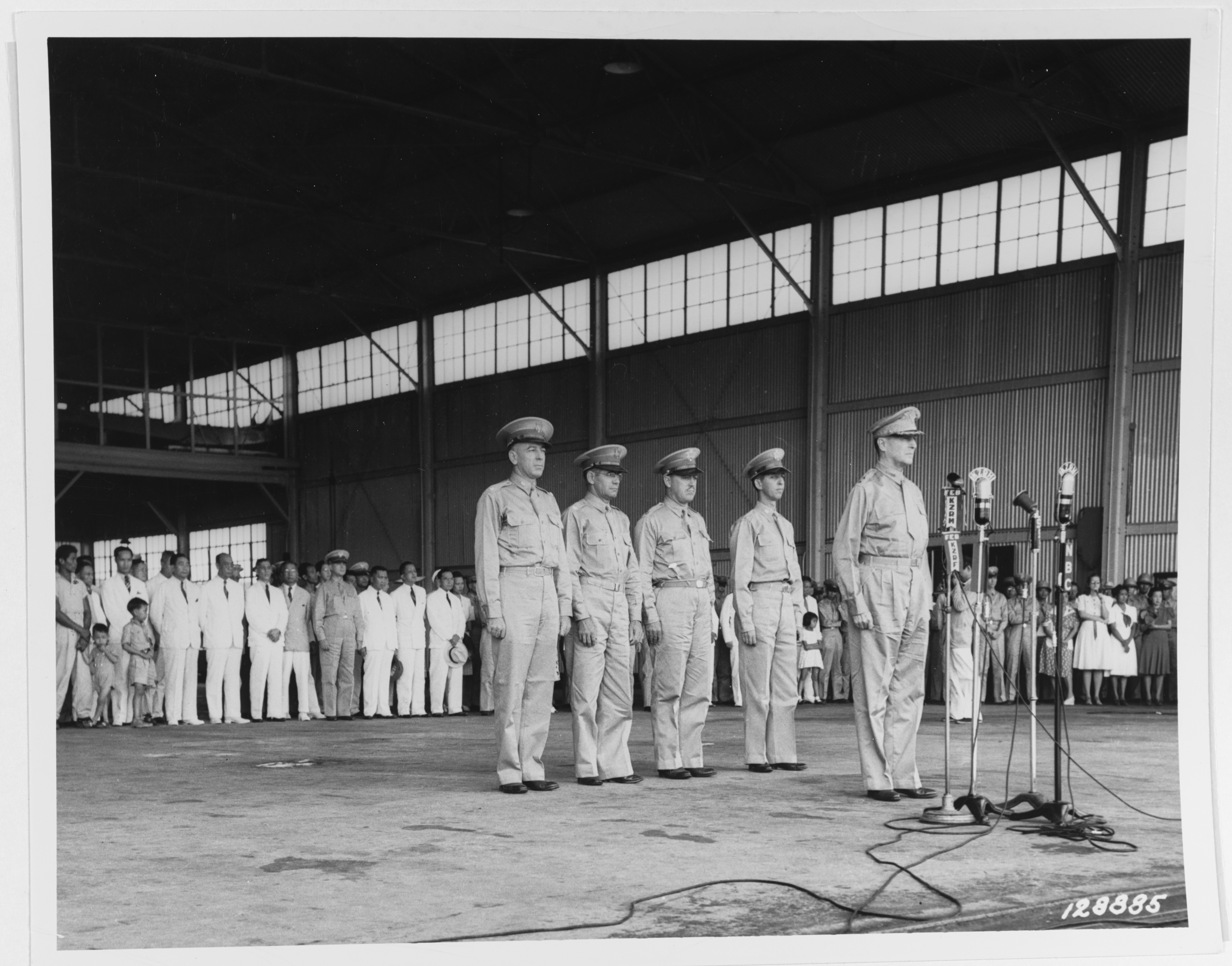
Ceremony at Camp Murphy, Rizal, 15 August 1941, marking the induction of the Philippine Army Air Corps. Lieutenant Colonel Richard K. Sutherland is on the left, behind Lieutenant General Douglas MacArthur

Returning to the United States, Sutherland married Josephine Whiteside in 1920. They had one child, a daughter named Natalie.

Sutherland was an instructor at the United States Army Infantry School from 1920 to 1923 and professor of military science and tactics at the Shattuck School from 1923 to 1928. He graduated from the Command and General Staff College in 1928. Fluent in French, Sutherland attended the École supérieure de guerre in 1930. During 1932 and 1933, he attended the U.S. Army War College. He then served with the Operations and Training Division of the War Department General Staff.

In 1937, Sutherland went to Tientsin, China, in command of a battalion of the 15th Infantry; however, he was not promoted to major until March 1938, when he was assigned to the Office of the Military Advisor to the Commonwealth Government (Philippines), Manila, under General Douglas MacArthur with the "local rank" of lieutenant colonel. Sutherland was promoted to the rank in July of that year. Sutherland soon eased his superior, Lieutenant Colonel Dwight D. Eisenhower out of his position and became MacArthur's chief of staff.

=== World War II ===
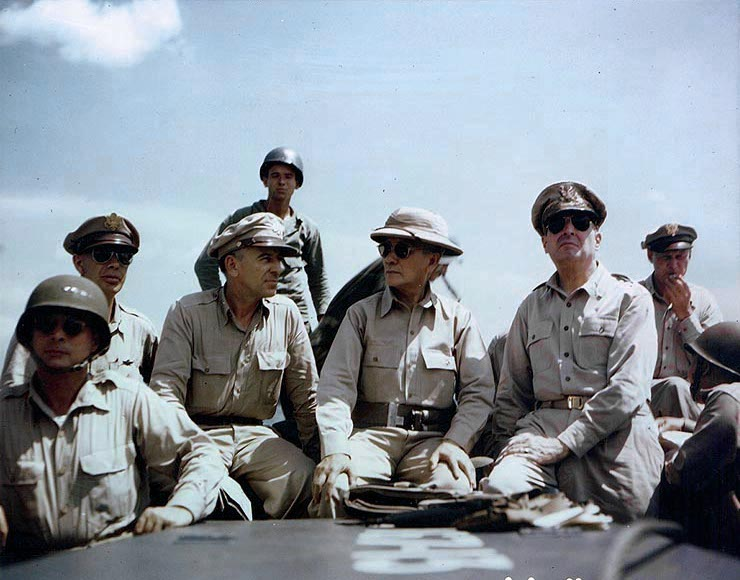
Left to right: Lieutenant General George Kenney, Lieutenant General Richard K. Sutherland, President Sergio Osmeña, General Douglas MacArthur, pictured here off Leyte, October 1944.

As tensions with Japan rose, Sutherland rose rapidly in rank, receiving a promotion to full colonel, then to brigadier general in July 1941 and to major general, just a few months later, in December 1941, the same month of America's entry into World War II.

Following the fall of Manila, MacArthur's headquarters moved to the island fortress of Corregidor, where it was the target of numerous Japanese air raids, forcing the headquarters to move into the Malinta Tunnel. Sutherland was a frequent visitor to the front on Bataan. He was given a cash payment of $75,000 by President Quezon. In March 1942, MacArthur was ordered by President Franklin D. Roosevelt to relocate to Australia. Sutherland selected the group of advisers and subordinate military commanders that would accompany MacArthur and escape from the Philippines in four PT boats. Sutherland would remain MacArthur's chief of staff for the entire war.

Sutherland attracted antagonism from subordinate American and Australian officers because of perceptions that he was high-handed and overprotective of MacArthur. Sutherland was often given the role of "hatchet man". Bad news invariably came through Sutherland rather than from MacArthur himself.

According to some sources he contributed to a rift between MacArthur and the first SWPA air forces commander, Lieutenant General George Brett. Major General George Kenney, Brett's successor, became so frustrated with Sutherland in one meeting, that Kenney drew a dot on a plain page of paper and said: "the dot represents what you know about air operations, the entire rest of the paper what I know."

Sutherland had been taught to fly in 1940 by US Army Air Corps instructors at the Philippine Army Training Center and had been awarded a civil pilot's license by the Civil Aeronautics Association. Flying then became one of his favourite recreational activities. Throughout the war, he flew often as a co-pilot with General MacArthur's personal pilot, Weldon "Dusty" Rhoades. In March 1943 he asked to be formally recognised as a "service pilot", a form of pilot restricted to non-combat duties. His request was turned down by the Commanding General of the U.S. Army Air Forces, General Henry H. Arnold on the grounds that he was over the age limit and not performing flying duties. However, Sutherland secured an official pilot's rating under Philippine Army regulations in 1945.

In 1943 Sutherland and Kenney took part in an effort to promote General MacArthur's candidacy for the Presidency, working with Senator Arthur H. Vandenberg of Michigan to get the War Department to rescind the order that prevented MacArthur from seeking or accepting political office.

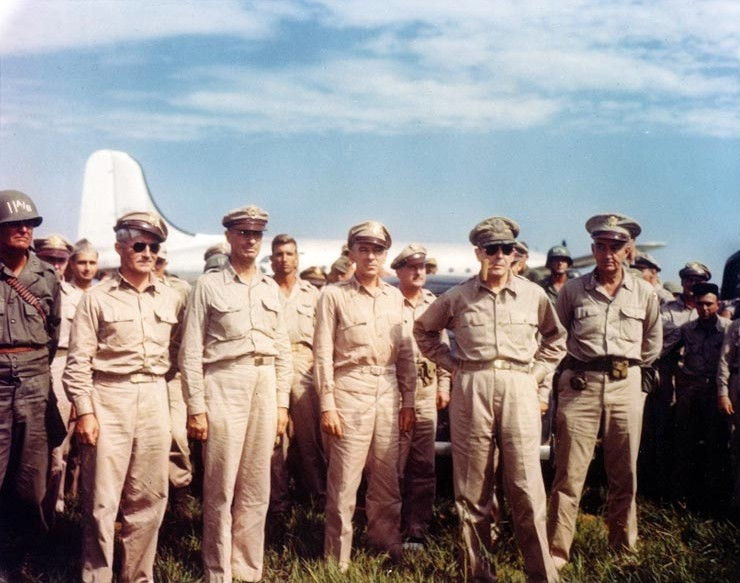
Japan, 30 August 1945 Among those present are: Major General Joseph M. Swing, Commanding General, 11th Airborne Division, (left); Lieutenant General Richard K. Sutherland (3rd from right); Douglas MacArthur (2nd From right); General Robert L. Eichelberger (right). Aircraft in the background is a Douglas C-54.

It was Sutherland who represented MacArthur before the Joint Chiefs of Staff on this and other occasions. Sutherland opened, read, and frequently answered all communications with MacArthur, including those addressed to him personally or "eyes only". Some decisions often attributed to MacArthur were actually taken by Sutherland. For example, the decision to bypass Mindanao and move on directly to Leyte was taken by Sutherland on MacArthur's behalf, while MacArthur was traveling under radio silence.

Sutherland's conduct in Washington enraged Army Chief of Staff General Marshall. He prepared a letter that he never sent to MacArthur saying Sutherland was "totally lacking in the facility of dealing with others.... He antagonized almost every official in the War Department with whom he came in contact and made our dealings with the Navy exceptionally difficult. Unfortunately he appears utterly unaware of the effects of his methods, but to put it bluntly, his attitude in almost every case seems to have been that he knew it all and nobody else knew much of anything."

When MacArthur discovered that Eisenhower had promoted his chief of staff, Walter Bedell Smith, to the rank of lieutenant general in January 1944, he immediately arranged for Sutherland to be promoted to the same rank.

==== Affair with Elaine Clark ====
During the time while MacArthur's GHQ SWPA was located in Melbourne, Sutherland met Elaine Bessemer Clark, the socialite daughter of Norman Brookes. Her husband, a British Army officer, was serving overseas. When GHQ moved to Brisbane in July 1942, Clark moved with it, as did two other civilian women, Beryl Stevenson and Louise Mowat, who worked as secretaries for Generals Kenney and Richard Marshall respectively. Sutherland installed Clark as the receptionist at the AMP Building, where MacArthur had his headquarters.

When GHQ began planning to move forward to New Guinea, Sutherland requested personnel from the Women's Army Corps to replace civilian employees of GHQ who, by agreement between MacArthur and the Prime Minister of Australia, John Curtin, could not be sent outside Australia. Sutherland further asked for direct commissions for Clark, Mowat and Stevenson. This exploited a loophole whereby enlistments in the Women's Army Corps were restricted to American citizens, but officer commissions were not. Major General Miller G. White, the U. S. Army Deputy Chief of Staff for Personnel, and Colonel Oveta Culp Hobby, the commanding officer of the Women's Army Corps, were strongly opposed; but they were overruled by Deputy Chief of Staff Joseph T. McNarney, on his being informed that the commissions were personally desired by MacArthur as essential to the operation of his headquarters and the prosecution of the war. Clark was commissioned as a captain, while the other two women, as well as General Eisenhower's driver, Kay Summersby, were commissioned as first lieutenants.

Although her rank was more a reflection of Sutherland's status rather than her own, Clark became an assistant to the headquarters commandant, with duties commensurate with her rank, and moved with Advance GHQ to Hollandia. However, her presence there, in contravention of MacArthur's agreement with Curtin, brought down the displeasure of MacArthur, who ordered her to be returned to Australia, first from Hollandia, and later from the Philippines. That Sutherland defied MacArthur on this matter caused a rift between the two.

=== Japanese surrender ===
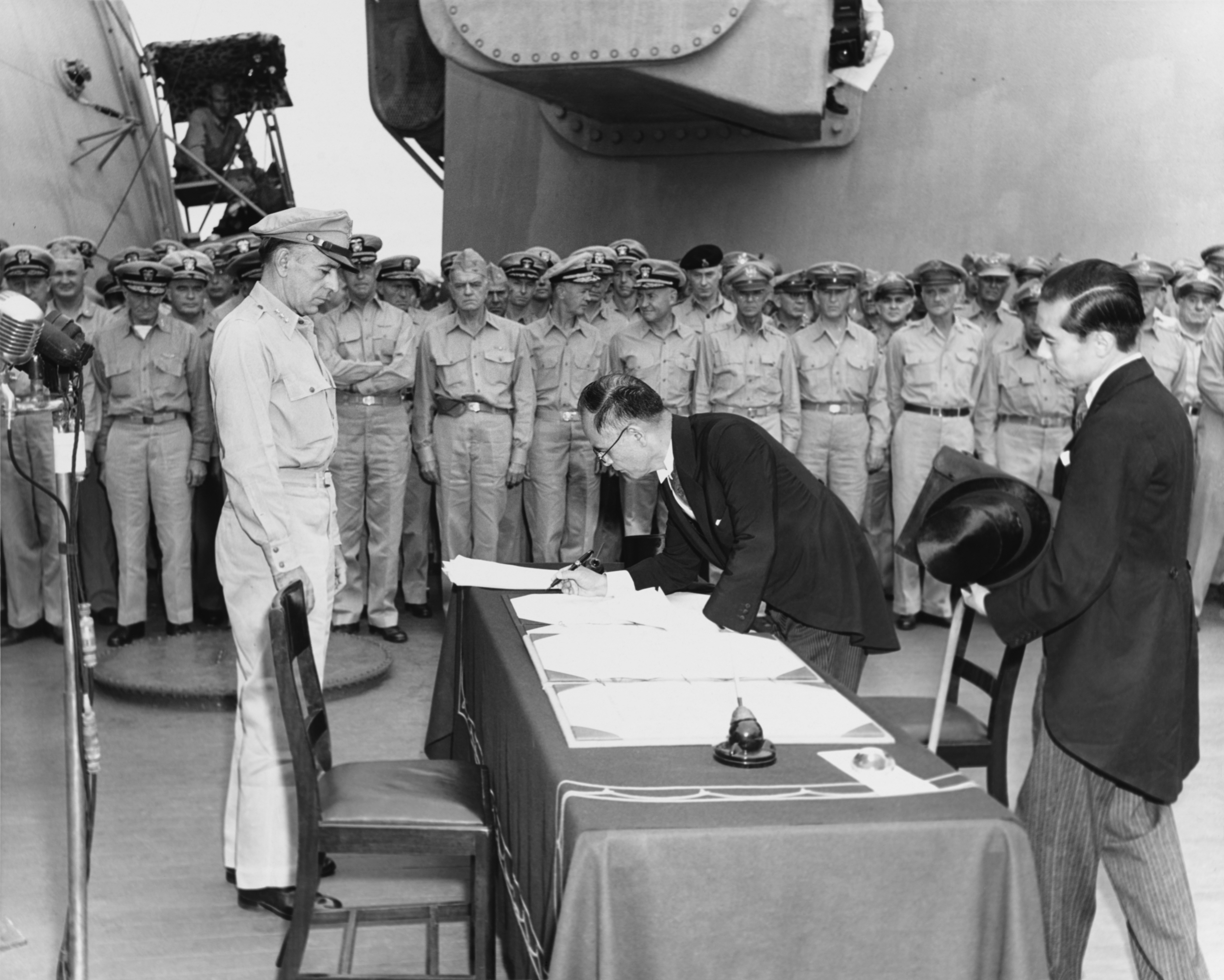
Richard K. Sutherland watches as Japanese Foreign Minister Mamoru Shigemitsu signs the Japanese Instrument of Surrender on behalf of the Japanese Government, on board USS Missouri (BB-63), 2 September 1945

At the Japanese surrender in Tokyo Bay on 2 September 1945, the Canadian representative, Colonel L. Moore Cosgrave, signed the Japanese Instrument of Surrender underneath, instead of on, the line for Canada. The Japanese drew attention to the error. Sutherland ran two strokes of his pen through the names of the four countries above the misplaced signatures and wrote them in where they belonged. The Japanese then accepted the corrected document.

== Later life and death ==
Sutherland retired from the U.S. Army on 30 November 1946.

Returning home, he confessed his affair to Josephine and was ultimately reconciled with her. Letters from Clark were intercepted and destroyed by Natalie.

After the death of Josephine on 30 December 1957, he married Virginia Shaw Root in 1962.

Sutherland died at Walter Reed Army Medical Center on 25 June 1966. His funeral was held at the Fort Myer, Virginia chapel on 29 June 1966 and he is buried at Arlington National Cemetery along with other family members.

== Decorations and medals ==
Distinguished Service Cross with oak leaf cluster
Army Distinguished Service Medal with oak leaf cluster
Silver Star with oak leaf cluster
Mexican Border Service Medal
World War I Victory Medal with two campaign clasps
American Defense Service Medal with "Foreign Service" clasp
Asiatic-Pacific Campaign Medal with four campaign stars
World War II Victory Medal
Army of Occupation Medal with "Japan" clasp
Companion of the Order of the Bath (United Kingdom)
Distinguished Service Star (Philippines)
Philippine Defense Medal with star
Philippine Liberation Medal with two stars
Philippine Independence Medal
Army General Staff Identification Badge

== Dates of rank ==
Insignia	Rank	Component	Date
No insignia in 1916	Private	Connecticut National Guard	10 July 1916
No pin insignia in 1916	Second Lieutenant	Connecticut National Guard	30 August 1916
No pin insignia in 1916	Second Lieutenant	Regular Army	28 November 1916
	First Lieutenant	Regular Army	5 December 1916 (Date of rank 28 November 1916)
	Captain	Regular Army	21 July 1917
	Major	Regular Army	24 March 1928
	Lieutenant Colonel	Regular Army	1 July 1938
	Brigadier General	Army of the United States	19 August 1941
	Major General	Army of the United States	24 December 1941
	Lieutenant General	Army of the United States	20 February 1944
	Colonel	Regular Army	1 October 1945
	Brigadier General	Regular Army	18 August 1944 (Retroactive promotion in 1946.)
	Lieutenant General	Regular Army, Retired	30 November 1946
