= Armistice of Malta =

1943 agreement between Italy and the Allies

The Additional Conditions for the Armistice with Italy Italian Instrument of Surrender
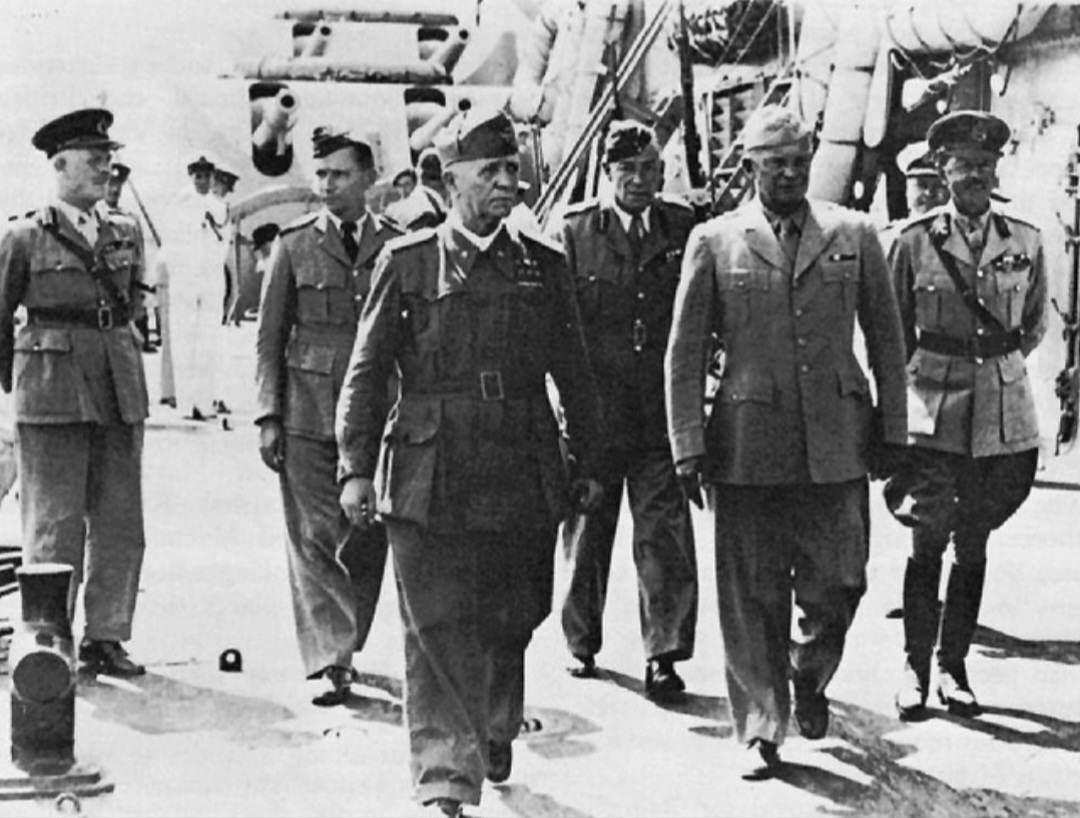
- Marshal Pietro Badoglio (at left) and General Dwight D Eisenhower (at right) with Lord Gort, (Note: Governor of Malta) Air Chief Marshal Arthur Tedder, (Note: Commander of the Mediterranean Air Command) Lt. Gen. Sir Noel Mason-MacFarlane, (Note: Later head of the Allied Commission in Italy) and General Harold Alexander, (Note: Commander of the 15th Army Group) aboard the British battleship HMS Nelson prior to the signing of the surrender document at Malta.
- Signed: 29 September 1943
- Location: Malta, aboard the British battleship HMS Nelson
- Condition: Signed
- Amendment: Amended by protocol on 9 November 1943
- Replaced by: Treaty of peace of 10 February 1947
- Signatories: (Kingdom of Italy) Pietro Badoglio; (United States) Dwight D. Eisenhower
- Parties: Italy; United States; United Kingdom
- Ratifiers: (Kingdom of Italy) Government of Italy Allied Governments

The Armistice of Malta, or referred to as the Additional Conditions for the Armistice with Italy in Italy and the Italian Instrument of Surrender by the Allies, was a written agreement which was signed on 29 September 1943 by Italy and the Allies in the latter of World War II. The documents was the modification of the signed Armistice of Cassibile, an armistice which was signed on 3 September 1943 in Cassibile, Sicily.

It was signed by Marshal Pietro Badoglio for Italy, and General Dwight D. Eisenhower for the Allies, at Malta aboard the British battleship HMS Nelson. The armistice was also referred to as the Long Armistice in Italy, which the shorter version of the long armistice was already signed at the Armistice of Cassibile.

== Background ==
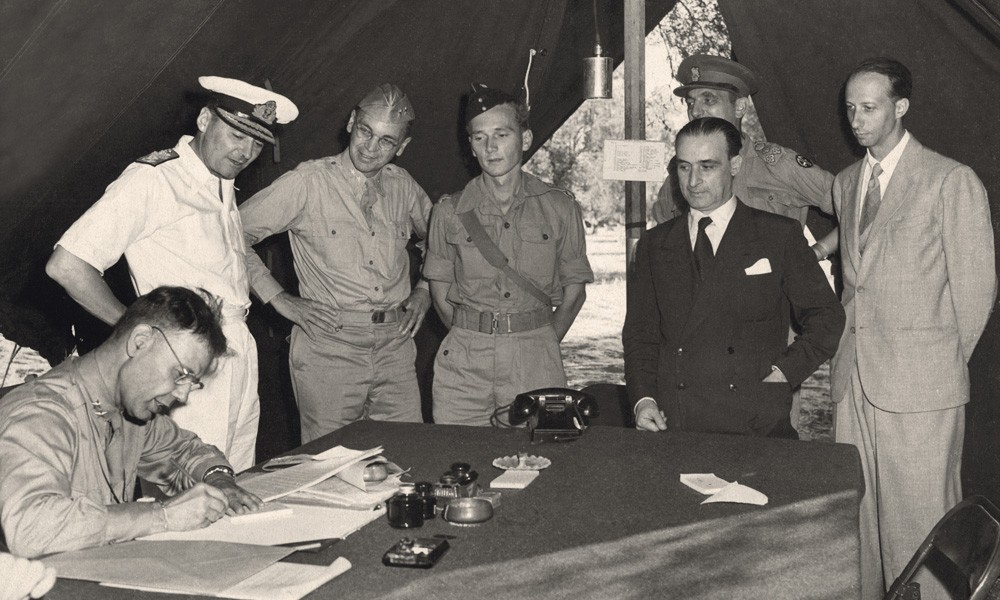
General Walter Bedell Smith signing the armistice with General Giuseppe Castellano and other Allied staff officers looking on, in the Fairfield military camp in Cassibile.

After the Fall of the Fascist regime in Italy, Benito Mussolini was ousted and arrested by King Victor Emmanuel III and replaced as Prime Minister of Italy by Badoglio. The Italians had begun to contact the Allies to cease hostilities between them. On 3 September, the Armistice of Cassibile was signed by General Giuseppe Castellano on behalf of Badoglio and General Walter Bedell Smith on behalf of Eisenhower (Supreme Allied commander for the Mediterranean theatre). The armistice was to take effect on 8 September per the Badoglio Proclamation.

Before the armistice, Germany had already been distrustful of Italy, since it believed that Italy was secretly negotiating with the Allies for a separate peace. After the Badoglio Proclamation, with the armistice to take effect on 8 September. Germany began Operation Achse that same day, a campaign to disarm Italian forces and occupy Italy. Badoglio and the King fled Rome before the Germans captured the city and went to Brindisi, both of which were controlled by the Allies. On 23 September, the Italian Social Republic was established by the Germans with Mussolini, after a German force led by SS Obersturmbannführer Otto Skorzeny rescued him from Campo Imperatore, as the head of state.

== Signing ==
Prior to the signing, the Allied delegations were: General Dwight D. Eisenhower, Commander-in-Chief of the Allied Forces, the British Admiral Sir Andrew Cunningham, Air Marshal Sir Arthur Tedder, General Harold Alexander, and General, Sir Noel Mason MacFarlane, head of the recently established AMGOT, that is, the "Allied Military Government in Occupied Territory". Lord John Gort, the Governor of Malta was also present for the ceremony.

For Italy, the delegations were: Marshal Pietro Badoglio, head of the Italian government, accompanied by General Vittorio Ambrosio, Chief of the Comando Supremo, General Mario Roatta, Chief of Staff of the Regio Esercito, Admiral Raffaele de Courten, Chief of Staff of the Regia Marina, and General Renato Sandalli, Chief of Staff of the Regia Aeronautica.

The Italian delegations embarked on the evening in Brindisi, together with General MacFarlane, on the Italian cruiser Scipione Africana, the cruiser that on 10 September escorted the corvette Baionetta, which left Ortona with the King, Badoglio and the others on board. The cruiser, commanded by Frigate captain Ernesto Pellegrini, left the port around 19:00 and arrived in Malta at 8:00.

The surrender document was signed at 11:30 by Badoglio and Eisenhower respectively at the wardroom of HMS Nelson, with both Allied and Italian officials were present in the signing ceremony. The article included that all Italian land, air, and naval forces must surrender to the Allies unconditionally, that Fascist organizations must be dismantled throughout Italy and the Italian dictator Benito Mussolini along with his high-ranking Fascist officials must be handed over to the United Nations. The documents was immediately in effect.

It specifies the twelve points contained in the short armistice and adds others, including:

- Art. 29. Benito Mussolini, his principal Fascist associates and all persons suspected of having committed war crimes or analogous offences [...] will be immediately arrested and handed over to the United Nations Forces.
- Art. 30. All Fascist organizations, including all branches of the Fascist militia ( Milizia Volontaria per la Sicurezza Nazionale ), the secret police ( OVRA ) and Fascist Youth organizations will, if not already done, be dissolved in accordance with the directions of the Supreme Commander of the Allied Powers. The Italian Government will comply with all further directions which the United Nations may give for the abolition of Fascist institutions, the dismissal and internment of Fascist personnel, the control of Fascist funds, the suppression of Fascist ideology and teaching.
- Art. 31. All Italian laws implying discrimination on grounds of race, colour, faith or political opinion shall, if this has not already been done, be repealed, and persons detained for such reasons shall, in accordance with the orders of the United Nations, be released and released from any legal impediment to which they have been subjected.
- Art. 33 (A). The Italian Government will carry out such instructions as the United Nations may give regarding restitution, delivery, services or payments by way of indemnity ( payments by reparation of war ) and payment of expenses of occupation.
- Art. 37. A control commission representing the United Nations will be appointed to regulate and execute this act in accordance with the general orders and directives of the Supreme Commander for the Allied Powers.

== Aftermath ==
On 13 October 1943, Badoglio announced the declaration of war of Italy on Germany, and became a co-belligerent fighting alongside the Allies. On 9 November 1943, the document was amended and was accepted by Italy and the Allied Powers. The amendment was signed at Brindsi by Badoglio and Noel Mason-MacFarlane, on behalf of the Allied Commander-in-Chief.

== See also ==
- Badoglio Proclamation
- German Instrument of Surrender
- Japanese Instrument of Surrender
- Kingdom of the South

== Bibliography ==
- Ivan Palermo, The Story of an Armistice, Le Scie, Mondadori, Milan, 1967
