= Kingdom of Southern Italy =

Kingdom of southern Italy may refer to:

- Kingdom of Sicily 1130–1282. A kingdom comprising southern Italy prior to breaking up into the Kingdom of Naples comprising mainland southern Italy, and the Kingdom of Sicily comprising the island of Sicily.
- Kingdom of the Two Sicilies, 1816–1861. The result of the reunification of the Kingdoms of Naples and Sicily.
- Kingdom of the South 1943-1945. The result of occupation by armies of USA and UK in southern Italy during WW II: it was a puppet state under control by AMGOT.

== See also ==
- Southern Italy
