= Walter Bedell Smith =

United States general (1895–1961)

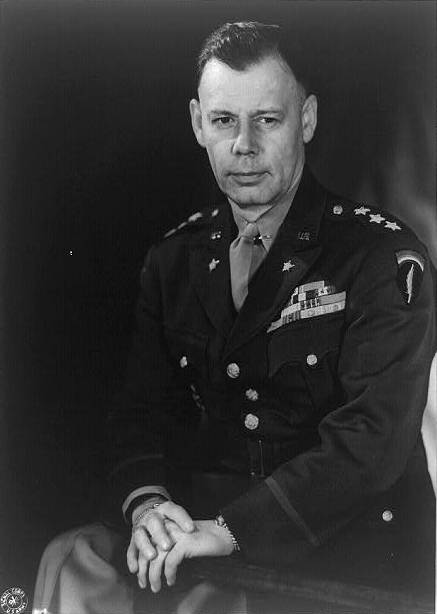
- Smith in 1948

18th United States Under Secretary of State
- In office 9 February 1953 – 1 October 1954
- President: Dwight Eisenhower
- Preceded by: David K. E. Bruce
- Succeeded by: Herbert Hoover Jr.

4th Director of Central Intelligence
- In office 7 October 1950 – 9 February 1953
- President: Harry Truman; Dwight Eisenhower
- Deputy: William H. Jackson; Allen Dulles
- Preceded by: Roscoe H. Hillenkoetter
- Succeeded by: Allen Dulles

United States Ambassador to the Soviet Union
- In office 3 April 1946 – 25 December 1948
- President: Harry Truman
- Preceded by: W. Averell Harriman
- Succeeded by: Alan G. Kirk

Personal details
- Born: 5 October 1895 Indianapolis, Indiana, U.S.
- Died: 9 August 1961 (aged 65) Washington, D.C., U.S.
- Spouse: Nory Cline (1917–1961)
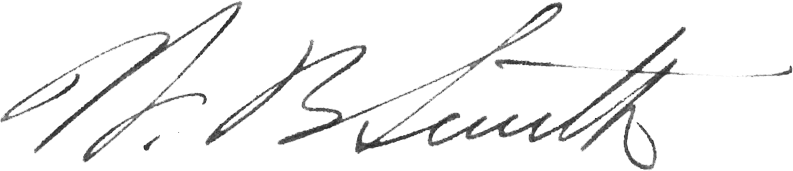
- Signature
- Nickname: Beetle

Military service
- Allegiance: United States
- Branch/service: United States Army
- Years of service: 1911–1953
- Rank: General
- Unit: Infantry Branch
- Commands: First Army
- Battles/wars: World War I; Aisne-Marne Offensive; World War II; North African campaign; Operation Torch; Tunisian campaign; Italian campaign; Operation Husky; Allied invasion of Italy; Battle of Normandy; Siegfried Line Campaign; Battle of the Bulge; Western Allied invasion of Germany
- Awards: Army Distinguished Service Medal (3); Navy Distinguished Service Medal; Legion of Merit; Bronze Star; National Security Medal (more below)
- ASN: 0-10197

General Walter Bedell "Beetle" Smith (5 October 1895 – 9 August 1961) was a senior officer of the United States Army who served as General Dwight D. Eisenhower's chief of staff at Allied Forces Headquarters (AFHQ) during the Tunisia Campaign and the Allied invasion of Italy in 1943 during World War II. He was Eisenhower's chief of staff at the Supreme Headquarters Allied Expeditionary Force (SHAEF) in the campaign in Western Europe from 1944 to 1945.

Smith enlisted as a private in the Indiana Army National Guard in 1911. During World War I, he served with the American Expeditionary Forces and was commissioned to second lieutenant in 1917. He was wounded in the Aisne-Marne Offensive in 1918. After the war, he was a staff officer and instructor at the U.S. Army Infantry School. In 1941, he became secretary of the General Staff, and in 1942 he became the secretary to the Combined Chiefs of Staff. His duties involved taking part in discussions of war plans at the highest level, and Smith often briefed President Franklin D. Roosevelt on strategic matters.

Smith became chief of staff to Eisenhower at AFHQ in September 1942 and acquired a reputation as Eisenhower's "hatchet man" for his brusque and demanding manner. However, he also successfully represented Eisenhower in sensitive missions requiring diplomatic skill. Smith was involved in negotiating the armistice between Italy and the Allies, which he signed on behalf of Eisenhower. In 1944, he became the chief of staff of SHAEF, again under Eisenhower. In that position, Smith also negotiated successfully for food and fuel aid to be sent through German lines for the cold and starving Dutch civilian population, and he opened discussions for the peaceful and complete German capitulation to the First Canadian Army in the Netherlands. In May 1945, Smith met representatives of the German High Command in Reims, France, to conduct the surrender of the German Armed Forces, and he signed the German Instrument of Surrender on behalf of Eisenhower.

After the war, he served as the U.S. Ambassador to the Soviet Union from 1946 to 1948. In 1950, Smith became the Director of Central Intelligence, the head of the Central Intelligence Agency (CIA) and the other intelligence agencies in the United States. Smith reorganized the CIA, redefined its structure and its mission, and gave it a new sense of purpose. He made the CIA the arm of government that is primarily responsible for covert operations. He left the CIA in 1953 to become Under Secretary of State. After retiring from the State Department in 1954, Smith continued to serve the Eisenhower administration in various posts for several years until he retired shortly before he died in 1961.

== Early life ==
Walter Bedell Smith was born in Indianapolis, Indiana, on 5 October 1895, the elder of two sons of William Long Smith, a silk buyer for the Pettis Dry Goods Company, and his wife, Ida Francis née Bedell, who worked for the same company.

Smith was called Bedell from his boyhood. From an early age he was nicknamed "Beetle" or occasionally "Beedle" or "Boodle." He was educated at St. Peter and Paul School, Public Schools #10 and #29, Oliver Perry Morton School, and Emmerich Manual High School, where he studied to be a machinist. There, he took a job at the National Motor Vehicle Company and eventually left high school without graduating. Smith enrolled at Butler University, but his father developed serious health problems, and Smith left to return to his job and support his family.

In 1911, at the age of 16, Smith enlisted as a private in Company D of the 2nd Indiana Infantry of the Indiana National Guard. The Indiana National Guard was called out twice in 1913 for the Ohio River flood and during the Indianapolis streetcar strike. Smith was promoted to corporal and then sergeant. During the Pancho Villa Expedition he served on the staff of the Indiana National Guard.

Smith was a practicing Catholic; in 1913, he met Mary Eleanor (Nory) Cline, who was born in 1893 and died in 1963. They married in a traditional Catholic ceremony on 1 July 1917. Their marriage was of long duration but was childless.

== World War I ==
With the army expanding for World War I, Smith's work during the Ohio River flood of 1913 led to his nomination for officer training in 1917, and he was sent to the Officers Candidate Training Camp at Fort Benjamin Harrison, Indiana. Upon graduation on 27 November 1917, he was commissioned as a second lieutenant in the Organized Reserve Corps and assigned to the newly formed Company A, 1st Battalion, 39th Infantry. The regiment was part of the 4th Division, which was then undergoing training at Camp Greene, North Carolina. On 9 May 1918, the division embarked at Hoboken, New Jersey, and it reached Brest, France on 23 May. After training with the British and French Armies, the 4th Division entered the front lines in June 1918 and joined the Aisne-Marne Offensive on 18 July 1918. Smith was wounded by shell fragments during an attack two days later.

Because of his wounds, Smith was returned to the United States. He served with the U.S. Department of War's General Staff and was assigned to the Military Intelligence Division. In September 1918, he was commissioned as a first lieutenant in the Regular Army.

Smith was next sent to the newly formed 379th Infantry Regiment as its intelligence officer. The regiment was part of the 95th Infantry Division, based at Camp Sherman, Ohio. The 95th Infantry Division was demobilized following the signing of the Armistice with Germany on 11 November 1918.

In February 1919, Smith was assigned to Camp Dodge, Iowa, where he was involved with the disposal of surplus equipment and supplies. In March 1919, he was transferred to the 2nd Infantry Regiment, a regular unit based at Camp Dodge, remaining there until November 1919, when it moved to Camp Sherman.

== Between the wars ==
In 1921, the staff of the 2nd Infantry moved to Fort Sheridan, Illinois. In 1922, Smith became aide de camp to Brigadier General George Van Horn Moseley, the commander of the 12th Infantry Brigade at Fort Sheridan. From 1925 to 1929 Smith worked as an assistant in the Bureau of the Budget. He then served a two-year tour of duty overseas on the staff of the 45th Infantry at Fort William McKinley in the Philippines. After nine years as a first lieutenant, he was promoted to captain in September 1929.

Returning to the United States, Smith reported to the U.S. Army Infantry School at Fort Benning, Georgia, in March 1931. Upon graduation in June 1932, he stayed on as an instructor in the Weapons Section in which he was responsible for demonstrating weapons like the M1918 Browning Automatic Rifle. In 1933, he was sent to the Command and General Staff School at Fort Leavenworth, Kansas. He later returned to the Infantry School but was detached again to attend the U.S. Army War College from which he graduated in 1937.

He returned to the Infantry School once more and he was promoted to major on 1 January 1939 after nine years as a captain. The slow promotion was common in the Army in the 1920s and the 1930s. Officers like Smith, commissioned between November 1916 and November 1918, made up 55.6% of the Army's officer corps in 1926. Promotions were usually based on seniority, and the modest objective of promoting officers to major after 17 years of service could not be met because of a shortage of posts for them to fill.

== World War II ==
=== Washington, D.C. ===
When General George C. Marshall became the Army's Chief of Staff in September 1939, he brought Smith to Washington, D.C., to be the assistant to the secretary of the General Staff. The Secretary of the General Staff was primarily concerned with records, paperwork, and the collection of statistics, but he also performed a great deal of analysis, liaison, and administration. One of Smith's duties was liaison with Major General Edwin "Pa" Watson, the senior military aide to President Franklin D. Roosevelt. Smith was promoted to lieutenant colonel on 4 May 1941, and then to colonel on 30 August 1941. On 1 September, the Secretary of the General Staff, Colonel Orlando Ward, was given command of the 1st Armored Division, and Smith became secretary of the General Staff.

The Arcadia Conference, which was held in Washington, D.C., December 1941 and January 1942, mandated the creation of the Joint Chiefs of Staff as a counterpart to the British Chiefs of Staff Committee, and Smith was named as its secretary on 23 January 1942. The same conference also brought about the creation of the Combined Chiefs of Staff, which consisted of the (American) Joint Chiefs of Staff and the (British) Chiefs of Staff Committee meeting as a single body. Brigadier Vivian Dykes of the British Joint Staff Mission provided the secretarial arrangements for the new organization at first, but Marshall thought that an American secretariat was required.

He appointed Smith as the secretary of the Combined Chiefs of Staff and of the Joint Chiefs of Staff. Since Dykes was senior in service time to Smith, and Marshall wanted Smith to be in charge, Smith was promoted to brigadier general on 2 February 1942. He assumed the new post a week later, with Dykes as his deputy. The two men worked in partnership to create and organize the secretariat and to build the organization of the Combined Chiefs-of-Staff into one which could co-ordinate the war efforts of both allies, along with the Canadians, Australians, French and others.

Smith's duties involved taking part in discussions of strategy at the highest level, and he often briefed Roosevelt on strategic matters. However Smith became frustrated as he watched other officers receive operational commands that he desired. He later remarked: "That year I spent working as secretary of the general staff for George Marshall was one of the most rewarding of my entire career, and the unhappiest year of my life."

=== North African Theater ===
When Major General Dwight D. Eisenhower was appointed as the commander of the European Theater of Operations in June 1942, he requested that Smith be sent from Washington as his chief of staff. Smith's record as a staff officer and his proven ability to work harmoniously with the British made him a natural choice for the post. Reluctantly, Marshall acceded to the request, and Smith took over as the chief of staff at Allied Forces Headquarters (AFHQ) on 15 September 1942. Reporting to him were two deputy chiefs of staff, Brigadier General Alfred Gruenther and Brigadier John Whiteley, and also the chief administrative officer (CAO), Major General Humfrey Gale.

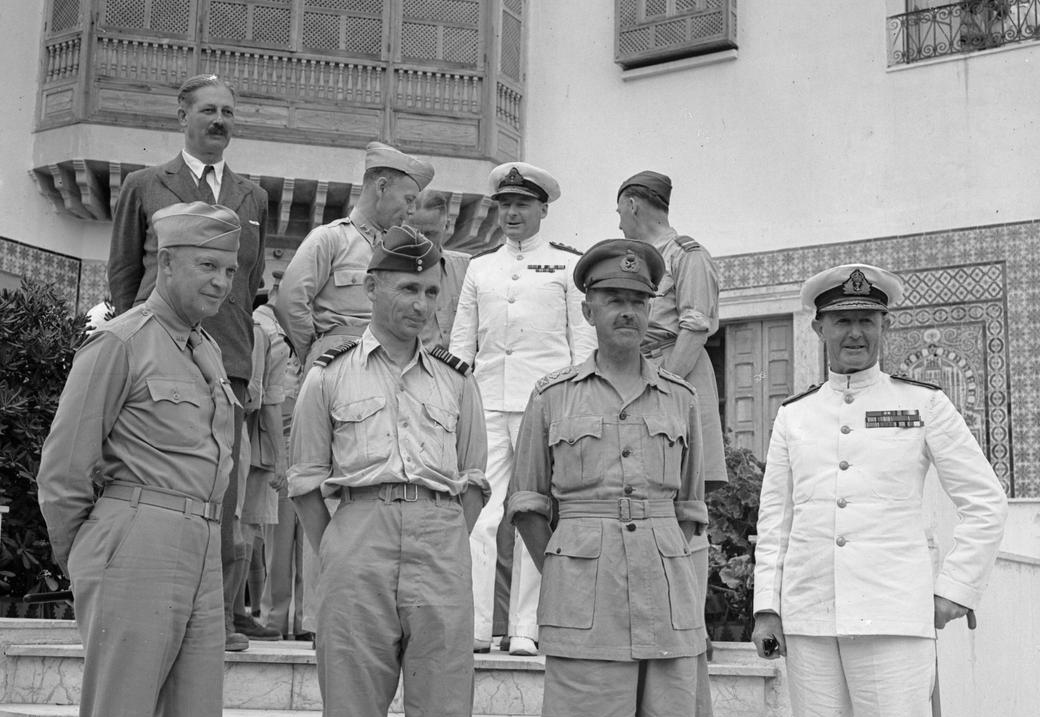
Allied leaders in the Allied invasion of Sicily. General Dwight Eisenhower meets in North Africa with (foreground from left to right): Air Chief Marshal Sir Arthur Tedder, General Sir Harold R.L.G. Alexander, Admiral Sir Andrew B. Cunningham, and (top row): Mr. Harold Macmillan, Major General W. Bedell Smith, an unidentified British officer, and Air Vice Marshal Philip Wigglesworth

AFHQ was a balanced binational organization in which the chief of each section was paired with a deputy of the other nationality. Its structure was generally American but with some British aspects. For example, Gale as CAO controlled both personnel and supply functions, which under the American system would have reported directly to Smith. Initially, AFHQ was located in London, but it moved to Algiers in November and December 1942, with Smith arriving on 11 December. Although AFHQ had an authorized strength of only 700, Smith aggressively expanded it. By January 1943 its American component alone was 1,406 and its strength eventually topped 4,000 men and women. As the chief-of-staff, Smith zealously guarded access to Eisenhower, acquired a reputation as a tough and brusque manager, and was often referred to as Eisenhower's "hatchet man."

Pending the organization of the North African Theater of Operations, U.S. Army (NATOUSA), Smith also acted as its chief of staff until 15 February, when Brigadier General Everett S. Hughes became the Deputy Theater commander and the commanding general of the Communications Zone. The relationship between Smith and Hughes, an old friend of Eisenhower, was tense. Smith later accused Hughes of "empire building," and the two clashed over trivial issues. In Algiers, Smith and Eisenhower seldom socialized together. Smith conducted formal dinners at his villa, an estate surrounded by gardens and terraces, with two large drawing rooms decorated with mosaics, oriental rugs, and art treasures. Like Eisenhower, Smith had a female companion, a nurse, Captain Ethel Westerman.

After the disastrous Battle of the Kasserine Pass, Eisenhower sent Smith forward to report on the state of affairs at the American II Corps. Smith recommended the relief of its commander, Major General Lloyd Fredendall, as did General Harold Alexander and Major Generals Omar Bradley and Lucian Truscott. On their advice, Eisenhower replaced Fredendall with Major General George S. Patton Jr. Eisenhower also relieved his Assistant Chief of Staff Intelligence (G-2), Brigadier Eric Mockler-Ferryman, pinpointing faulty intelligence at AFHQ as a contributing factor in the defeat at Kasserine. Mockler-Ferryman was replaced by Brigadier Kenneth Strong.

The debacle at Kasserine Pass strained relations between the Allies, and another crisis developed when II Corps reported that enemy aviation operated at will over its sector because of an absence of Allied air cover. That elicited a scathing response from British Air Marshal Arthur Coningham on the competence of American troops. Eisenhower drafted a letter to Marshall suggesting that Coningham should be relieved of his command since he could not control the acrimony between senior Allied commanders, but Smith persuaded him not to send it. Instead, Air Chief Marshal Arthur Tedder, Major General Carl Spaatz, and Brigadier General Laurence S. Kuter paid Patton a visit at his headquarters. Their meeting was interrupted by a German air raid, which convinced the airmen that Patton had a point. Coningham withdrew his written criticisms and apologized.

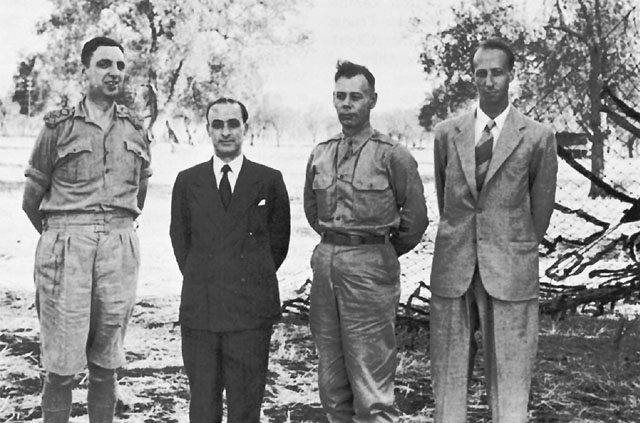
Secret Emissaries to Lisbon (left to right) Brigadier Kenneth W. D. Strong, Generale di Brigata Giuseppe Castellano, Smith, and Consul Franco Montanari, an official from the Italian Foreign Office

For the Allied invasion of Sicily, the Combined Chiefs of Staff designated Eisenhower as the overall commander but ordered the three component commanders, Alexander, Tedder, and Admiral Sir Andrew Cunningham of the Royal Navy, to "cooperate". To Eisenhower, that command arrangement meant a reversion to the old British "committee system". He drafted a cable to the Combined Chiefs of Staff demanding a unified command structure, but Smith persuaded him to tear it up.

Disagreements arose between Allied commanders over the operational plan, which called for a series of dispersed landings based on the desire of the air, naval, and logistical planners concerning the early capture of ports and airfields. General Bernard Montgomery, the commander of the British Eighth Army, objected to that aspect of the plan since it exposed the Allied forces to defeat in detail. Montgomery put forward an alternate plan that involved American and British forces landing side by side. He convinced Smith that his alternate plan was sound, and the two men persuaded most of the other Allied commanders. Montgomery's plan provided for the early seizure of airfields, which satisfied Tedder and Cunningham. The fears of logisticians like Major General Thomas B. Larkin that supply would not be practical without a port were resolved by the use of amphibious trucks.

In August 1943, Smith and Strong flew to Lisbon via Gibraltar in civilian clothes and met with Generale di Brigata Giuseppe Castellano at the British embassy. Castellano had hoped to arrange terms for Italy to join the United Nations against Nazi Germany, Smith was empowered to draw up an armistice between Italy and Allied armed forces but was unable to negotiate political matters. On 3 September, Smith and Castellano signed the agreed-upon text on behalf of Eisenhower and Pietro Badoglio, respectively, in a simple ceremony beneath an olive tree at Cassibile, Sicily. In October, Smith traveled to Washington for two weeks to represent Eisenhower in a series of meetings, including one with Roosevelt at Hyde Park, New York, on 10 October.

=== European theater ===
In December 1943, Eisenhower was appointed Supreme Allied Commander for Operation Overlord, the invasion of Normandy. Eisenhower wished to take Smith and other key members of his AFHQ staff with him to his new assignment, but British Prime Minister Winston Churchill wanted to retain Smith at AFHQ as Deputy Supreme Commander in the Mediterranean. Churchill reluctantly gave way at Eisenhower's insistence. On New Year's Eve, Smith met with General (one day later Field Marshal) Sir Alan Brooke to discuss the transfer of key British staff members from AFHQ to Supreme Headquarters Allied Expeditionary Force (SHAEF). Brooke released Gale only after a strong appeal from Smith but refused to transfer Strong. A heated exchange resulted, and Brooke later complained to Eisenhower about Smith's behavior. That was the only time that a senior British officer ever complained openly about Smith. Whiteley became Chief of Intelligence (G-2) at SHAEF instead of Strong, but Eisenhower and Smith had their way in the long run, and Strong assumed the post on 25 May 1944, with Brigadier General Thomas J. Betts as his deputy.

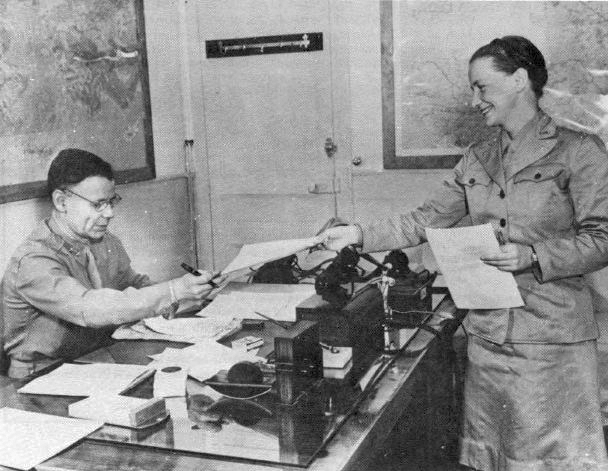
Smith and his wartime secretary, Ruth Briggs, who was also Smith's executive assistant when he was a postwar ambassador to the Soviet Union

Smith was promoted to lieutenant general and made a Knight Commander of the Order of the Bath in January 1944. On 18 January, he set out for London with two-and-a-half tons of personal baggage loaded onto a pair of Boeing B-17 Flying Fortresses. The staff of the chief-of-staff to the Supreme Allied Commander (COSSAC) was already active, and he had been planning Operation Overlord since April 1943.

This staff was absorbed into SHAEF, with COSSAC, with Major General Frederick Morgan, becoming Smith's deputy chief of staff at SHAEF. Gale also held the title of deputy chief of staff, as well as being chief administrative officer, and there was also a deputy chief of staff (Air), Air Vice Marshal James Robb. The heads of the other staff divisions were Major General Ray W. Barker (G-1), Major General Harold R. Bull (G-3), Major General Robert W. Crawford (G-4) and Major General Sir Roger Lumley (G-5).

Morgan had located his COSSAC headquarters in Norfolk House at 31 St. James's Square, London, but Smith moved it to Bushy Park, in the outskirts of London in accord with Eisenhower's expressed desire not to have his headquarters in a major city. A hutted camp was built with 130,000 square feet (12,000 m^{2}) of floor space. By the time Operation Overlord began, accommodations had been provided for 750 officers and 6,000 enlisted men and women.

Eisenhower and Smith's offices were in a subterranean complex. Smith's office was spartan, dominated by a large portrait of Marshall. An advanced command post codenamed Sharpener was established near Portsmouth, where Montgomery's 21st Army Group and Admiral Sir Bertram Ramsay's Allied Naval Expeditionary Force headquarters were located.

Ground operations in Normandy were controlled by Montgomery at first, but the SHAEF Forward headquarters moved to Jullouville in August, and on 1 September Eisenhower assumed control of Bradley's 12th Army Group and Montgomery's 21st Army Group. Smith soon realized that he had made a mistake. The forward headquarters was remote and inaccessible and lacked the necessary communications equipment.

On 6 September, Eisenhower ordered both SHAEF Forward and SHAEF Main to move to Versailles as soon as possible. SHAEF Forward began its move on 15 September and it opened in Versailles on 20 September. SHAEF Main followed, moving from Bushy Park by air. The move was completed by October, and SHAEF remained there until 17 February 1945, when SHAEF Forward moved to Reims. By this time, SHAEF had grown in size to 16,000 officers and enlisted men, of whom 10,000 were American and 6,000 British.

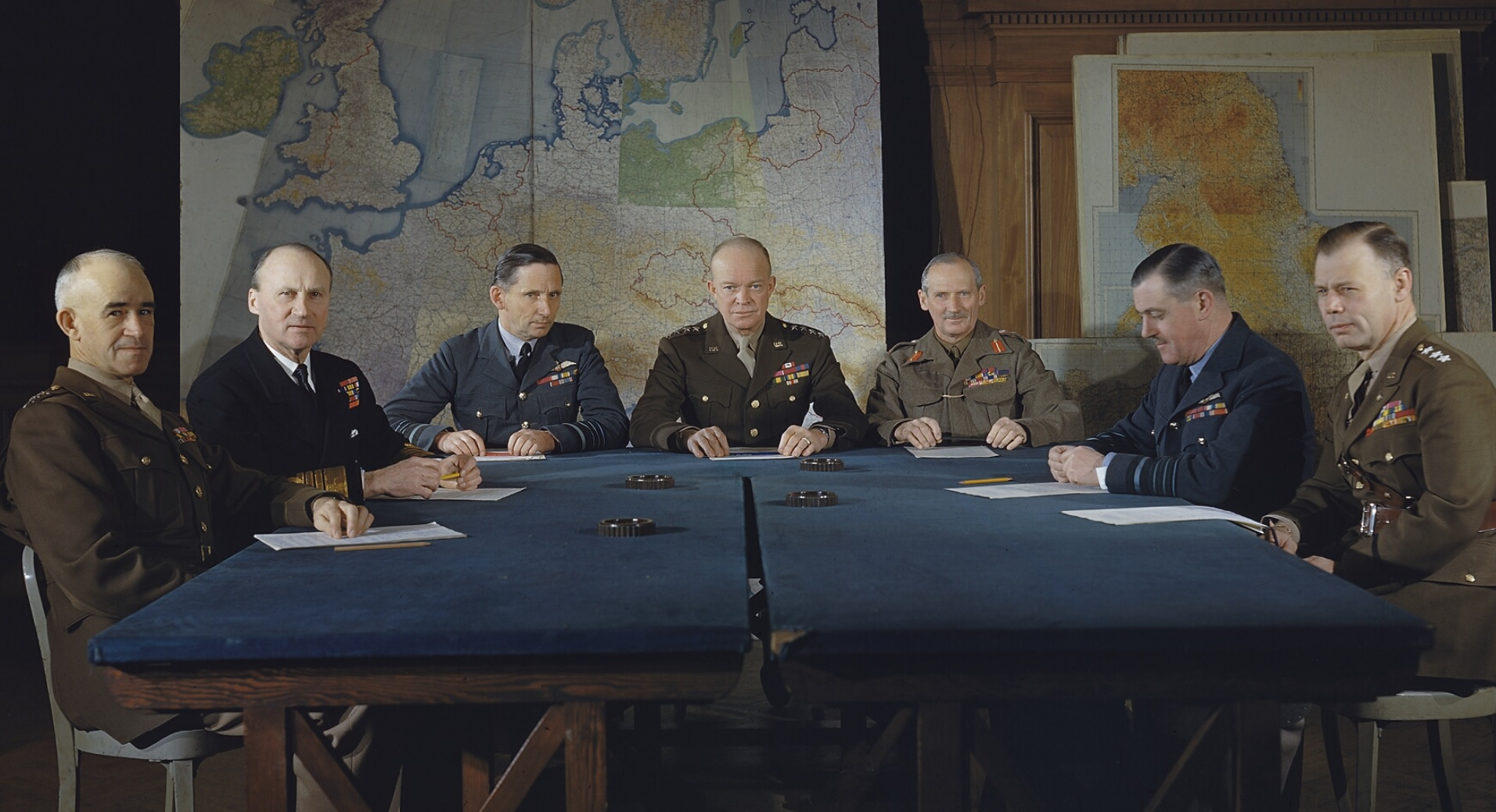
Meeting of the Allied Supreme Command in February 1944. Left to right:Lieutenant General Omar Bradley, Admiral Sir Bertram Ramsay, Air Chief Marshal Sir Arthur Tedder, General Dwight Eisenhower, General Sir Bernard Montgomery, Air Chief Marshal Sir Trafford Leigh-Mallory and Lieutenant General Bedell Smith

By November 1944, Strong was reporting that there was a possibility of a German counteroffensive in the Ardennes or the Vosges. Smith sent Strong to personally warn Bradley, who was preparing an offensive of his own. The magnitude and ferocity of the German Ardennes Offensive came as a shock, and Smith had to defend Strong against criticism for failing to sound the alarm. He felt that Bradley had been given ample warning.

Once battle was joined, Eisenhower acted decisively by committing the two armored divisions in the 12th Army Group's reserve over Bradley's objection, along with his own meager reserves, two airborne divisions. Whiteley and Betts visited the U.S. First Army headquarters and were unimpressed with how its commanders were handling the situation. Strong, Whiteley, and Betts recommended that command of the armies north of the Ardennes be transferred from Bradley to Montgomery.

Smith's immediate reaction was to dismiss the suggestion out of hand. He told Strong and Whiteley that they were fired and should pack their bags and return to the United Kingdom. On the next morning, Smith apologized, had had second thoughts, and informed them that he would present their recommendation to Eisenhower as his own. He realized the military and political implications and knew that such a recommendation had to come from an American officer. On 20 December, he recommended it to Eisenhower, who telephoned both Bradley and Montgomery, and Eisenhower ordered it.

This decision was greatly resented by many Americans, particularly in 12th Army Group, who felt that the action discredited the U.S. Army's command structure. Heavy casualties since the start of Operation Overlord had resulted in a critical shortage of infantry replacements even before the crisis situation created by the Ardennes Offensive. Steps were taken to divert men from Communications Zone units. The commander of the Communication Zone, Lieutenant General John C. H. Lee, persuaded Eisenhower to allow soldiers to volunteer for service "without regard to color or race to the units where assistance is most needed, and give you the opportunity of fighting shoulder to shoulder to bring about victory."

Smith immediately grasped the political implications and put his position to Eisenhower in writing:

Although I am now somewhat out of touch with the War Department's Negro policy, I did, as you know, handle this during the time I was with General Marshall. Unless there has been a radical change, the sentence which I have marked in the attached circular letter will place the War Department in very grave difficulties. It is inevitable that this statement will get out, and equally inevitable that the result will be that every Negro organization, pressure group and newspaper will take the attitude that, while the War Department segregates colored troops into organizations of their own against the desires and pleas of all the Negro race, the Army is perfectly willing to put them in the front lines mixed in units with white soldiers, and have them do battle when an emergency arises. Two years ago I would have considered the marked statement the most dangerous thing that I had ever seen in regard to Negro relations. I have talked with Lee about it, and he can't see this at all. He believes that it is right that colored and white soldiers should be mixed in the same company. With this belief I do not argue, but the War Department policy is different. Since I am convinced that this circular letter will have the most serious repercussions in the United States, I believe that it is our duty to draw the War Department's attention to the fact that this statement has been made, to give them warning as to what may happen and any facts which they may use to counter the pressure which will undoubtedly be placed on them.

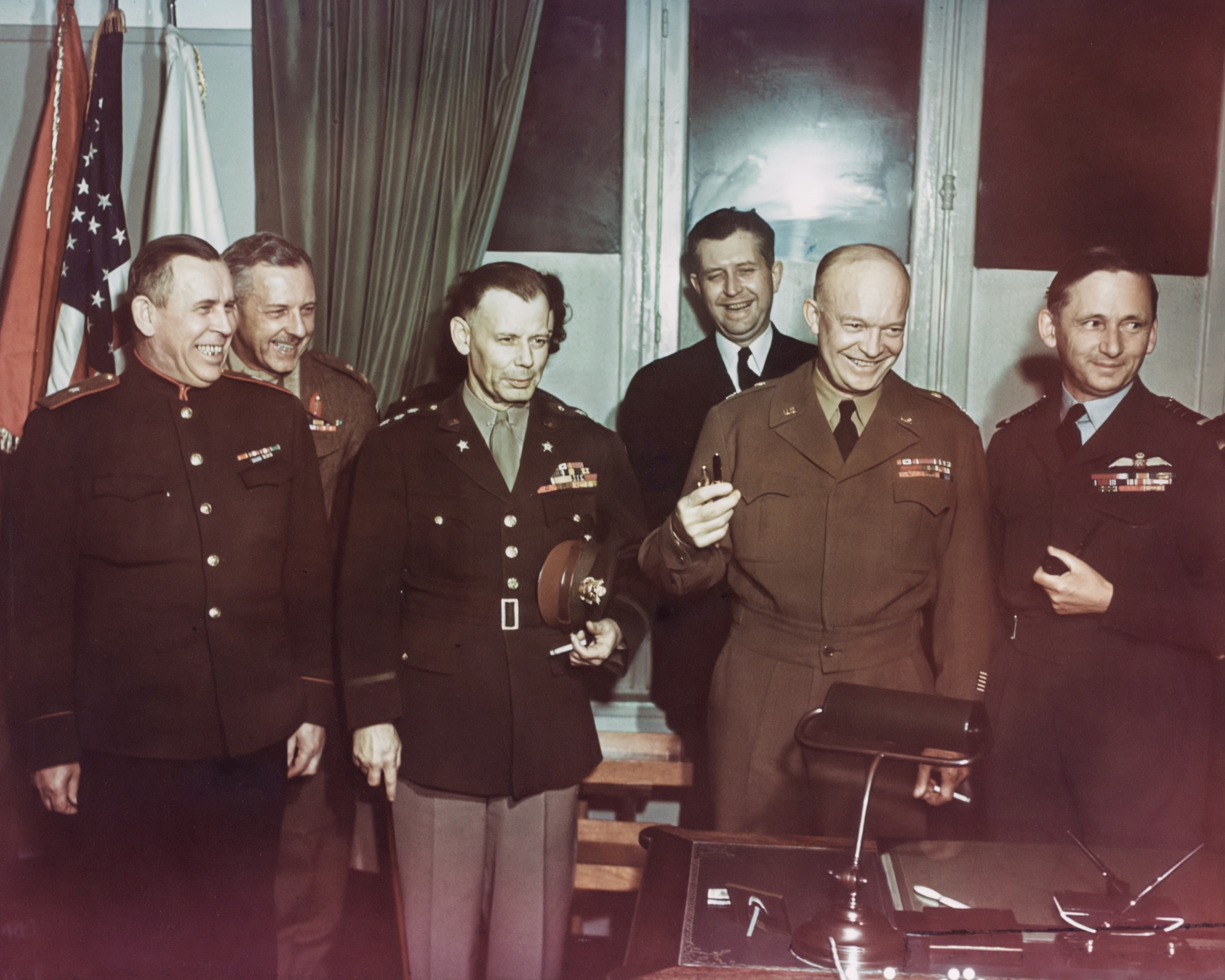
Senior Allied commanders at Reims shortly after the German surrender. Present are (left to right): Major General Ivan Susloparov, Lieutenant General Frederick Morgan, Lieutenant General Bedell Smith, Captain Kay Summersby (obscured), Captain Harry C. Butcher, General of the Army Dwight Eisenhower, Air Chief Marshal Arthur Tedder

The policy was revised, with colored soldiers serving in provisional platoons. In the 12th Army Group these were attached to regiments, while in the 6th Army Group the platoons were grouped into whole companies attached to the division. The former arrangement were generally better rated by the units they were attached to, because the colored platoons had no company-level unit training.

During the liberation of Paris, the Allied High Command put pressure on the Free French Forces leading the march to be all white, which was made difficult as the vast majority of units were over two-thirds African. Smith wrote a confidential memo that stated that it was "more desirable that the division mentioned above consist of white personnel" to match US segregated platoons.

On 15 April 1945, the Nazi governor (Reichskommissar) of the Netherlands, Arthur Seyss-Inquart, offered to open up Amsterdam to food and coal shipments to ease the suffering of the civilian population. Smith and Strong, representing SHAEF, along with Major General Ivan Susloparov representing the Soviet Union, Prince Bernhard of Lippe-Biesterfeld representing the Dutch government, and Major General Sir Francis de Guingand from 21st Army Group, met with Seyss-Inquart in the Dutch village of Achterveld on 30 April. After threatening Seyss-Inquart with prosecution for war crimes, Smith successfully negotiated for the provision of food to the suffering Dutch civilian population in the cities in the west of the country and opened discussions for the peaceful and complete German capitulation in the Netherlands to the First Canadian Army, which occurred on 5 May.

Smith had to conduct another set of surrender negotiations, that of the German armed forces, in May 1945. Smith met with the representatives of the German High Command (the Oberkommando der Wehrmacht), Colonel General Alfred Jodl and General-Admiral Hans-Georg von Friedeburg. Once again, Strong acted as an interpreter. Smith took a hard line by threatening that unless terms were accepted, the Allies would seal the front, which would force the remaining Germans into the hands of the Red Army, but he made some concessions on a ceasefire before the surrender came into effect. On 7 May, Smith cosigned the surrender document along with Soviet General Susloparov, both of whom represented the Allies, and Jodl, who represented Germany. The French representative, Major General François Sevez, signed as a witness.

== Postwar ==
=== Ambassador to the Soviet Union ===
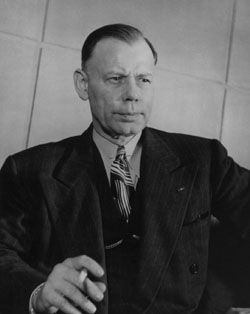
Smith as the U.S. Ambassador to the Soviet Union, 1946–48

Smith briefly returned to the United States in late June 1945, after spending several days resting at the 108th General Hospital in Clichy, France. In August, Eisenhower nominated Smith as his successor as commander of U.S. Forces, European Theater, as ETOUSA was redesignated on 1 July 1945. Smith was passed over in favor of General Joseph McNarney. When Eisenhower took over as Chief of Staff of the U.S. Army in November 1945, he summoned Smith to become his assistant chief of staff for operations and planning. However, soon after his arrival back in Washington he was asked by President Harry S. Truman and U.S. Secretary of State James F. Byrnes to become the United States Ambassador to the Soviet Union. In putting Smith's nomination for the post before the United States Senate, Truman asked for and received special legislation permitting Smith to retain his permanent military rank of major general.

Smith's service as the American ambassador was eventful. Although it was not Smith's fault, the relationship between the United States and the Soviet Union during his tenure deteriorated rapidly as the Cold War set in. Smith's tenacity of purpose was in line with the policy of containment that replaced - about 1947 - the conciliatory stance that had for some years tried to find common ground with Moscow. He became convinced that no understanding was possible in dealings with the Soviets short of acquiescence to their expansionism, and that their intransigence and delaying tactics precluded the reconstruction and economic recovery of Europe. He saw the Soviet Union as a secretive, totalitarian, and antagonistic state. In My Three Years in Moscow (1950), Smith's account of his time as ambassador, he wrote:

...we are forced into a continuing struggle for a free way of life that may extend over a period of many years. We dare not allow ourselves any false sense of security. We must anticipate that the Soviet tactic will be to wear us down, to exasperate us, and to keep probing for weak spots, and we must cultivate firmness and patience to a degree we have never before required.

Smith returned to the United States in March 1949. Truman offered him the post of Assistant Secretary of State for European Affairs, but Smith declined the appointment and preferred to return to military duty. He was appointed as the commander of the First Army at Fort Jay in New York, his first command since 1918. Throughout the war, Smith had been troubled by a recurring stomach ulcer. The problem became severe in 1949. He was no longer able to eat a normal diet, and he suffered from malnutrition. Smith was admitted to the Walter Reed Army Hospital, whose surgeons decided to remove most of his stomach. That did cure his ulcer, but Smith remained malnourished and thin.

=== Director of Central Intelligence ===
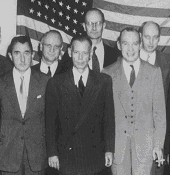
Smith (center) with top CIA leaders, including outgoing Director of Central Intelligence Roscoe H. Hillenkoetter (to Smith's left, in the light suit), 7 October 1950

Truman selected Smith as Director of Central Intelligence (DCI), the head of the Central Intelligence Agency (CIA). Since the post had been established in 1946, there had been three directors, none of whom had wanted the position. Smith became the director on 7 October 1950.

The 1949 Intelligence Survey Group had produced the Dulles-Jackson-Correa Report, which found that the CIA had failed in its responsibilities in both the coordination and production of intelligence. In response, the U.S. National Security Council accepted the conclusions and recommendations of the report. It remained to implement them. In May 1950, Truman decided that Smith was the man he needed for the CIA. Before Smith could assume the post on 7 October, there was a major intelligence failure. The North Korean invasion of South Korea in June 1950, which started the Korean War, took the administration entirely by surprise and raised fears of World War III.

Since Smith knew little about the CIA, he asked for a deputy who knew a lot. Sidney Souers, the executive secretary of the National Security Council, recommended William Harding Jackson, one of the authors of the Dulles-Jackson-Correa Report, to Smith. Jackson accepted the post of deputy director on three conditions, one of which was "no bawlings out."

Smith and Jackson moved to reorganize the agency in line with the recommendations of the Dulles-Jackson-Correa Report. They streamlined procedures to gather and disseminate intelligence. On 10 October, Smith was asked to prepare estimates for the Wake Island Conference between the president and General Douglas MacArthur. Smith insisted for the estimates to be simple, readable, conclusive, and useful, rather than mere background. They reflected the best information available, but unfortunately, one estimate concluded that the Chinese would not intervene in Korea, which was another major intelligence failure.

Four months after the outbreak of the Korean War, the CIA had produced no co-ordinated estimate of the situation in Korea. Smith created a new Office of National Estimates (ONE) under the direction of William L. Langer, the Harvard historian who had led the Research and Analysis branch of the wartime Office of Strategic Services (OSS). Langer's staff created procedures that were followed for the next two decades. Smith stepped up efforts to obtain economic, psychological, and photographic intelligence. By 1 December, Smith had formed a Directorate for Administration. The agency would ultimately be divided by function into three directorates: Administration, Plans, and Intelligence.

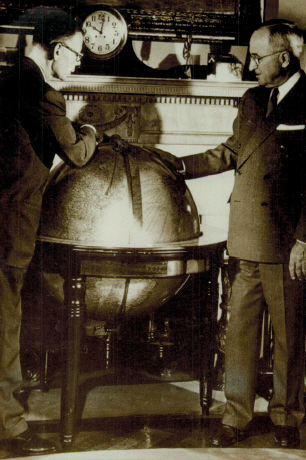
D.C.I. Smith briefing President Truman

Smith is remembered in the CIA as its first successful Director of Central Intelligence and one of its most effective by redefining its structure and mission. The CIA's expansive covert action program remained the responsibility of Frank Wisner's quasi-independent Office of Policy Coordination (OPC), but Smith began to bring OPC under the DCI's control. In early January 1951 he made Allen Dulles the first deputy director for plans (DDP), to supervise both OPC and the CIA's separate espionage organization, the Office of Special Operations (OSO). Not until January 1952 were all intelligence functions consolidated under a deputy director for intelligence (DDI). Wisner succeeded Dulles as DDP in August 1951, and it took until August 1952 to merge the OSO and the OPC, each of which had its own culture, methods, and pay scales, into an effective, single directorate.

By consolidating responsibility for covert operations, Smith made the CIA the arm of government that was primarily responsible for them. Smith wanted the CIA to become a career service. Before the war, the so-called "Manchu Law" limited the duration of an officer's temporary assignments, which effectively prevented anyone from making a career as a general staff officer. There were no schools for intelligence training, and the staffs had little to do in peacetime. Career officers therefore tended to avoid such work unless they aspired to be a military attaché. Smith consolidated training under a director of training and developed a career service program.

When Eisenhower was appointed as the Supreme Allied Commander Europe in 1951, he asked for Smith to serve as his chief of staff again. Truman turned down the request by stating that the DCI was a more important post. Eisenhower therefore took Lieutenant General Alfred Gruenther with him as his chief of staff. When Eisenhower later recommended Gruenther's elevation to four-star rank, Truman decided that Smith should be promoted as well. However, Smith's name was omitted from the promotion list. Truman then announced that no one would be promoted before Smith, which occurred on 1 August 1951. Smith retired from the Army upon leaving the CIA on 9 February 1953.

=== Under Secretary of State ===
On 11 January 1953, Eisenhower, now president-elect, announced that Smith would become an Under Secretary of State. Smith's appointment was confirmed by the U.S. Senate on 6 February and he resigned as the DCI three days later. In May 1954, Smith traveled to Europe in an attempt to convince the British to participate in an intervention to avert French defeat in the Battle of Dien Bien Phu. When that failed, he reached an agreement with the Soviet Foreign Minister, Vyacheslav Molotov to partition Vietnam into two separate zones.

In 1953, Guatemalan President Jacobo Árbenz Guzmán threatened to nationalize land belonging to the United Fruit Company. Smith ordered the American ambassador in Guatemala to put a CIA plan for a Guatemalan coup into effect, which was accomplished by the following year. Smith left the State Department on 1 October 1954 and took up a position with the United Fruit Company. He also served as president and chairman of the board of the Associated Missile Products Company and AMF Atomics Incorporated, vice chairman of American Machine and Foundry (AMF) and a director of RCA and Corning Incorporated.

=== Final positions ===
After retiring as Under Secretary of State in 1954, Smith continued to serve the Eisenhower administration in various posts. He was a member of the National Security Training Commission from 1955 to 1957, the National War College board of consultants from 1956 to 1959, the Office of Defense Mobilization Special Stockpile Advisory Committee from 1957 to 1958, the President's Citizen Advisors on the Mutual Security Program from 1956 to 1957, and the President's Committee on Disarmament in 1958.

Smith was a consultant at the Special Projects Office (Disarmament) in the Executive Office of the President from 1955 to 1956. He also served as chairman of the advisory council of the President's Committee on Fund Raising and as a member-at-large from 1958 to 1961. In recognition of his other former boss, he was a member of the George C. Marshall Foundation Advisory Committee from 1960 to 1961.

In 1955, Smith was approached to perform the voice-over and opening scene for the film To Hell and Back, which was based on the autobiography of Audie Murphy. He accepted and had small parts in the movie, most notably in the beginning in which he was dressed in his old service uniform. He narrated several parts of the film and referred constantly to "the foot soldier." Smith was portrayed on screen by Alexander Knox in The Longest Day (1962), Edward Binns in Patton (1970) and Timothy Bottoms in Ike: Countdown to D-Day (2004). On television he has been portrayed by John Guerrasio in Cambridge Spies (2003), Charles Napier in War and Remembrance (1989), Don Fellows in The Last Days of Patton (1986) and J.D. Cannon in Ike: The War Years (1979).

== Death and legacy ==
Smith suffered a heart attack on 9 August 1961 at his home in Washington, D.C., and he died in the ambulance on the way to Walter Reed Army Hospital. He was entitled to a Special Full Honor Funeral, but his widow requested that a simple joint service funeral be held, which was patterned after the one given to Marshall in 1959. She selected a grave site for her husband in Section 7 of Arlington National Cemetery, near Marshall's grave. She was buried next to him after her death in 1963. Smith's papers are in the Eisenhower Presidential Center in Abilene, Kansas.

U.S. president Richard M. Nixon said that President Eisenhower and many Europeans thought Smith was the greatest chief of staff during the World War II.

== Dates of rank ==
Insignia	Rank	Component	Date
No insignia	Private	Indiana National Guard	1911
Various	Corporal to Sergeant	Indiana National Guard	to 1917
No pin insignia at the time	Second lieutenant	Officers' Reserve Corps	27 November 1917
	First lieutenant	Regular Army (United States Army)	10 September (effective 4 October) 1918
	First lieutenant	Regular Army	1 July (effective 23 September) 1920 (permanent rank)
	Captain	Regular Army	24 September 1929
	Major	Regular Army	1 January 1939
	Lieutenant colonel	Army of the United States	18 April (effective 3 May) 1941
	Lieutenant colonel	Regular Army	4 May 1941
	Colonel	Army of the United States	30 August 1941
	Brigadier general	Army of the United States	2 February 1942
	Major general	Army of the United States	3 December 1942
	Brigadier general	Regular Army	1 September 1943
	Lieutenant general	Army of the United States	13 January 1944
	Major general	Regular Army	1 August 1945
	General	Army of the United States	1 August 1951
	General	Regular Army, retired	31 January 1953

== Awards and decorations ==
U.S. military decorations
Army Distinguished Service Medal with two oak leaf clusters
Navy Distinguished Service Medal
Legion of Merit
Bronze Star Medal
U.S. Civil Medals
National Security Medal
U.S. Military Service Medals
World War I Victory Medal with three battle clasps
American Defense Service Medal
European-African-Middle Eastern Campaign Medal with seven service stars
World War II Victory Medal
Army of Occupation Medal with "Germany" clasp
National Defense Service Medal
International and Foreign Awards
Grand Croix de l'Ordre de la Couronne (Belgium)
Croix de guerre with palm (Belgium)
Order of Military Merit, Grand Cross (Brazil)
Medal of Military Merit of the Army, First Class, Grand Cross (Chile)
Order of the White Lion, Star II Class (Czechoslovakia)
War Cross 1939–1945 (Czechoslovakia)
Legion of Honor, Grand Officer (France)
Croix de guerre 1914–1918 with palm (France)
Croix de guerre 1939–1945 with palm (France)
Order of Kutuzov First Class (Union of Soviet Socialist Republics)
Order of the Bath, Knight Commander (United Kingdom)
Order of the British Empire, Knight Commander (United Kingdom)
Order of the Oak Crown, Grand Cross (Luxembourg)
Order of Ouissam Alaouite, Grand Cross (Morocco)
Order of the Netherlands Lion, Knight Grand Cross (Netherlands)
Order of Virtuti Militari, Silver Cross (Poland)
Order of Polonia Restituta, II Class (Poland)
Cross of Grunwald, Second Class (Poland)
Order of Nichan Iftikhar (Tunisia)

== Notes ==
Diplomatic posts
Preceded by W. Averell Harriman	United States Ambassador to the Soviet Union; 1946–1948	Succeeded by Alan G. Kirk
Military offices
Preceded by Roscoe B. Woodruff	Commanding General First Army; 1949–1950	Succeeded by Roscoe B. Woodruff
Government offices
Preceded by Roscoe H. Hillenkoetter	Director of Central Intelligence; 1950–1953	Succeeded by Allen Dulles
Political offices
Preceded by David K. E. Bruce	United States Under Secretary of State; 1953–1954	Succeeded by Herbert Hoover Jr.
