= Citizen Advisors on the Mutual Security Program =

The U.S. President's Citizen Advisors on the Mutual Security Program (the Fairless Committee) was created by President Dwight D. Eisenhower on September 22, 1956. The purpose of the committee was to study and make recommendations on the role, scope, operation, and impact of military, economic, technical and other foreign assistance programs in relation to the foreign policy and national interest of the United States. It reported to the president on March 1, 1957, and ceased operations by the close of that month.

== Activity ==
The committee received testimony and reports on foreign aid programs from major military and foreign policy figures. The committee also made a six-week round-the-world trip during which members interviewed leading military and political figures in European and Asian nations receiving American aid. Committee members also received briefings from American military assistance advisory teams and embassy staffs during the trip.

While the committee received an appreciable amount of input on military aid, its major recommendations were in the field of economic assistance and administrative changes in the foreign aid program. It recommended gradual reciprocal tariff reduction to the end of achieving minimal foreign quantitative restrictions on American trade. Also recommended were support of regional organizations like the European Common Market; tax incentives for American private investment abroad; continued government loans to supplement efforts of the Export-Import Bank, the World Bank and the International Monetary Fund; and continuation of the agricultural surplus sales program (PL 480).

In the administrative field, the committee recommended separation of military and economic appropriations, integration of the International Cooperation Administration into the U.S. State Department, two-year appropriations for foreign aid, and greater discretionary authority for the executive branch in spending foreign assistance funds.

== Membership ==
Benjamin F. Fairless, Chairman
Colgate W. Darden, Jr.
Richard R. Deupree
John L. Lewis
Whitelaw Reid
Walter Bedell Smith
Jesse W. Tapp

== Special Representatives ==
J. Lawton Collins
John C. Hughes

== Staff ==
Howard J. Mullin, Executive Director
Donald B. Woodward, Staff Director
Jack Bennett, Economist
Means Johnston, Jr., Military Adviser
Edward B. Hall, Consultant
