= Kingdom of the South =

Period of Italian history under Allied occupation (1943 - 1944)

Kingdom of Italy; Regno d'Italia (Italian)
- 1943–1944
- Flag Coat of arms
- Motto: FERT (Motto for the House of Savoy)
- Anthem: (1943–1944); La Leggenda del Piave ("The Legend of Piave")
- Territory controlled by the Kingdom of Italy Territory administered by the Italian Social Republic and Nazi Germany
- Status: Rump State of Italian Monarchy
- Capital: Rome (de jure): Brindisi (de facto from September 1943 to February 1944); Salerno (de facto from February 1944 to June 1944)
- Largest city: Rome
- Official languages: Italian
- Religion: Roman Catholicism
- Demonym: Italian
- Government: Constitutional monarchy under Allied military administration
- King
  - 1900 - 1946: Victor Emmanuel III
- Prime Minister
  - 1943 - 1944: Pietro Badoglio
- Historical era: World War II; Italian Campaign; Italian Civil War
  - Operation Achse: 8 September 1943
  - Long Armistice: 29 September 1943
  - Liberation of Rome: 4 June 1944
- Currency: AM-Lira
Preceded by	Succeeded by
Kingdom of Italy	Kingdom of Italy
- Today part of: Italy

The Kingdom of the South (Italian: Regno del Sud) was a period in the history of the Kingdom of Italy, lasting from September 1943 to June 1944, which followed the German occupation of northern and central Italy. Regno del Sud was never an official designation; all documents and acts continued to refer to the Kingdom of Italy, and it was recognized internationally (other than by the Axis powers) as the legitimate state for the whole of Italy, including the German-occupied north (where the Italian Social Republic was established).

Strictly speaking, the term is used with reference to the period between September 1943, when King Victor Emmanuel III and the government fled Rome to Brindisi in the aftermath of the Armistice of Cassibile until Rome was liberated by the Allies in June 1944 and resumed its function as capital of Italy. However, its use is often extended to cover the period up to 1945 and the end of the war, that is, the entire period that Italy remained divided, during which time the Italian government, although it had re-established itself in Rome, still did not have full control of its nominal territory or local, police and military bodies. Administrative, military and political activities, and their documentation, were split between those managed by the government of Rome, by the Italian Social Republic, by the partisan forces and by the armies in the field.

== History ==
After the landing of the Allies in Sicily, the Armistice of Cassibile, its announcement on 8 September and the flight of the king from Rome, the Badoglio Government, established in Brindisi, maintained the constitutional structure of the Kingdom of Italy, trying to reconstruct the state administration, since almost all the officials and ministerial employees had remained trapped in the capital.

On the evening of 10 September, King Victor Emmanuel III announced, in a recorded message broadcast by Radio Bari, the reasons that had prompted him to leave Rome:

"For the supreme good of the fatherland, which has always been my first thought and the purpose of my life, and with the intent of avoiding more serious suffering and greater sacrifices, I have authorized the request for an armistice. Italians, for the safety of the Capital and to be able to fully fulfil my duties as King, with the Government and the Military Authorities, I have moved to another point of the sacred and free national soil. Italians! I confidently rely on you for every event, as you can count, to the ultimate sacrifice, on your King. May God assist Italy in this grave hour of its history."

King Victor Emmanuel III on Radio Bari, 10 September 1943

For the Allies, it was necessary that in liberated Italy there was a government capable of exercising a legitimate power to counter that of the Italian Social Republic established in Salò. For this reason, already on 19 September the Apulian provinces of Bari, Brindisi, Lecce and Taranto and Sardinia were not placed under the control of the Allied Military Administration of the Occupied Territories (AMGOT) but were recognised as independent and entrusted to the government of Badoglio, albeit under the strict control of the Allied Control Commission.

One of the first acts of the government established in Brindisi was the signing of the so-called long armistice, integrated by the short armistice signed in Cassibile on 3 September. While making the principle of unconditional surrender effective, the Allies committed themselves to softening the conditions in proportion to the help that Italy would provide in the fight against the Nazis.

On 13 October the government declared war on Germany. From a political point of view, this declaration was very important, since it placed Italy within the Allied forces, albeit with the qualification of co-belligerent. From this moment the Italian government slowly began to acquire greater autonomy. In this first phase, only Sardinia and the provinces of Puglia were under the control of the government, while the rest of the liberated territory remained under the control of the Allied Military Administration.

At its formation in September 1943, the Kingdom of the South only controlled Apulia, Sardinia, and parts of Basilicata and Calabria. Sicily, then under the AMGOT administration following its capture during Operation Husky in the summer of 1943, was returned to the control of the Italian government in February 1944. More territories came under the control of the Kingdom of the South as the Allies advanced northwards along the Italian Peninsula. The king and government initially established their seat in Brindisi, although the city was never officially designated as the capital of Italy. The de facto sovereignty of the kingdom was limited, as it was subject to the Allied Control Commission for Italy.

=== The transfer of the government to Salerno ===
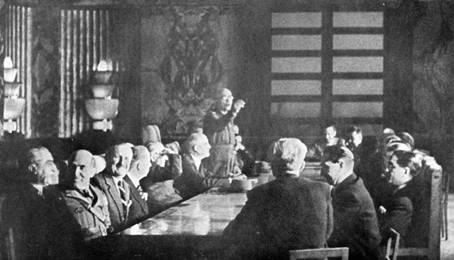
The installation of the Badoglio II government in Salerno.

On 11 February 1944, the Allies transferred jurisdiction over Sicily, which had been under Allied Military Administration since July 1943, and over the provinces of southern Italy already occupied and those that were gradually being liberated to the Italian government. The jurisdiction of AMGOT was thus reduced to Naples, to the areas close to the front and to those of particular military interest.

Also in February 1944, the government moved to Salerno, which thus became the provisional capital of Italy. The so-called Salerno turning point allowed a compromise to be found between the anti-fascist parties, the monarchy and Marshal Badoglio that allowed the formation of a government of national unity with the participation of all the political forces present in the National Liberation Committee, temporarily setting aside the political and institutional disagreements that arose after the fall of fascism. On 22 April 1944, the second Badoglio government took office, politically supported by a coalition of the recently reconstituted Italian parties.

=== Transfer of the government to Rome ===
On 4 June 1944, Rome was liberated and the following day Victor Emmanuel III appointed his son Umberto as Lieutenant of the Kingdom, retiring to private life. Umberto took office at the Quirinale and, on the proposal of the CLN, entrusted the task of forming the new government to Ivanoe Bonomi, an elderly political leader who had been Prime Minister before the advent of fascism. The new government thus took office in July in the capital.

== The use of the term and the historical debate ==
The expression "Kingdom of the South" has often been used in contrast to the so-called "Republic of Salò", the self-proclaimed Italian Social Republic, led by Benito Mussolini and recognized by Nazi Germany, which at the same time controlled the portion of Italian territory under German military occupation.

According to some historians, the expression is used improperly, both as a comparison with Salò, and because the "kingdom" is not considered as an entity in itself, but as a continuation of the Kingdom of Italy without formal discontinuity.

The first use of the expression is attributed to the economist Agostino degli Espinosa, at the time of the events attached to the press office of the government of Brindisi, who published in 1946 an essay entitled precisely Il Regno del Sud, with which the author intended to make known «a first attempt at chronicling the events in which the political life of liberated Italy was expressed between 10 September 1943 and 5 June 1944.

In some cases, the term "Kingdom of the South" has been used with a political connotation to identify the discontinuity between the fascist period and the birth of the first democratic governments in the post-war period.

In the historiographical field, the expression is used to identify in an extensive way also the period that reaches 1945 and the end of the war, that is, until when Italy was still divided and the Italian government, which had re-established itself in Rome, did not have full control of the territory and of the local, police and military bodies. In this situation, the administrative, military, and political acts and the related documentation were divided between those managed by the government of Rome, by the Italian Social Republic, by the partisan forces, and by the armies in the field.

In the political, historical and journalistic controversies on the events following the armistice, the Kingdom of the South is sometimes indicated as a puppet state without real autonomy under the direct control of the Allies, by analogy with the judgement given to the Republic of Salò as a state without autonomy created by Nazi Germany. In this sense, the "Kingdom of the South" is indicated, ex-post, as the true continuator of the Italian State from a legal point of view, in opposition to the Italian Social Republic, by virtue of the outcome of the conflict. Furthermore, the action undertaken by the government and the officials established in Brindisi is also seen as an attempt to return to the pre-fascist political and constitutional situation, with reference to the liberal parliamentary monarchy regime which ended with the March on Rome in 1922.
