= Giuseppe Castellano =

Italian general (1893–1977)

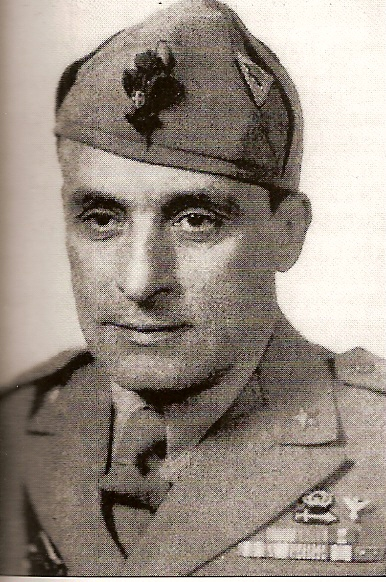
- Born: September 12, 1893; Prato, Tuscany, Italy
- Died: July 31, 1977 (aged 83); Porretta Terme, Emilia-Romagna, Italy
- Military career
- Allegiance: Kingdom of Italy
- Branch: Royal Italian Army
- Service years: 1913–1944
- Rank: Brigadier General
- Conflicts: World War I World War II

Giuseppe Castellano (September 12, 1893 – July 31, 1977) was an Italian general who negotiated and signed the armistice between Italy and the Allies on September 3, 1943.

== Biography ==
=== Military career ===
Of Sicilian descent but born in Prato, he was the son of a military man. His career in the Army was rapid and brilliant. During the First World War, he was Captain of Artillery. In 1941, he was promoted to brigadier general during the Invasion of Yugoslavia and was the youngest general in Italy. In 1942 he was called to the Army General Staff and the following year, to the High Command and collaborated as personal aide with General Vittorio Ambrosio.

He was a close friend of Benito Mussolini's son-in-law Galeazzo Ciano, who was the Italian Minister of Foreign Affairs. Ciano was involved in ousting Mussolini in July 1943 after the Allied invasion of Sicily. Castellano sided with Ciano and had a prominent role in the events that led up to the fall of the fascist regime. He organised the arrest of Mussolini.

=== Armistice with the Allies ===
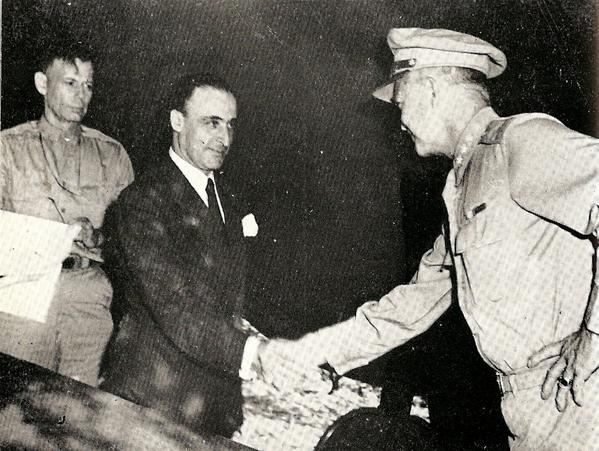
Castellano (in civilian attire) shakes hands with Dwight Eisenhower after the signing of the Armistice between Italy and Allied armed forces in Cassibile on September 3, 1943

The new Prime Minister, Pietro Badoglio, sent Castellano to Lisbon in order to contact Allied diplomats to set the conditions for the surrender of Italy. He ordered Castellano to insist that any surrender of Italy was subject to a landing of Allied troops on the Italian mainland (the Allies at this point were holding Sicily and some minor islands). Badoglio also dared to ask for access to Allied military plans, which was not accepted.

After complicated negotiations the government and king accepted the conditions for the armistice. On September 3, 1943, Castellano, in lieu of Badoglio, and General Walter Bedell Smith, in place of General Dwight D. Eisenhower, signed the armistice agreement in the town of Cassibile, near Syracuse, in Sicily. The agreement was not announced until September 8, when Badoglio addressed the nation during a radio broadcast.

=== Intervention in post-war Sicilian politics ===
After the armistice Castellano emerged as Sicily’s military commander. He had been given powers to hold talks to resolve the separatist threat to Italian unity. He became convinced that the Sicilian Mafia was the strongest political and social force on Sicily to be reckoned with. He started to establish cordial relations with Mafia leaders. The general believed that law and order could be restored if "the system formerly employed by the old and respected Maf(f)ia should return to the Sicilian scene."

Castellano made contacts with Mafia leaders and met with them several times. He gained the co-operation of the Mafia boss Calogero Vizzini, who had supported separatism but was now prepared for a change in the island's political situation. Together with Vizzini, he approached Trapani politician Virgilio Nasi to offer him the leadership of a movement for Sicilian autonomy with the support of the Mafia. The plan was to stage Nasi as a candidate for High Commissioner for Sicily to oppose the favourite, the Christian Democrat Salvatore Aldisio.

Castellano's initiative weakened the Sicilian Independence Movement (Movimento Indipendentista Siciliano, MIS) of Andrea Finocchiaro Aprile. The Mafia, however, became a force of order and stability on the island and prevented a separatist overthrow by stifling extremist elements in the movement. The seeds were planted from which the Mafia would tremendously benefit in the decades to come.

=== Retirement and death ===
He wrote a number of books about his experiences during the War: Come firmai l'armistizio di Cassibile (How I signed the armistice in Cassibile), published by Mondadori in 1945; La guerra continua (The continuous war); and Roma Kaputt. In 1947, he retired from the Army and became the director of a chain of hotels and thermal baths for some years. He died in Porretta Terme on July 31, 1977.

== Sources ==
- Agarossi, Elena (2000). A Nation Collapses: The Italian Surrender of September 1943, New York: Cambridge University Press, ISBN 0-521-59199-6
- Finkelstein, Monte S. (1998). Separatism, the Allies and the Mafia: The Struggle for Sicilian Independence, 1943-1948, Bethlehem (Pennsylvania): Lehigh University Press, ISBN 0-934223-51-3
