= Armistice of Cassibile =

1943 armistice ending the hostilities between Italy and the Allies

The armistice of the Italian state to the conditions provided by the Allies.
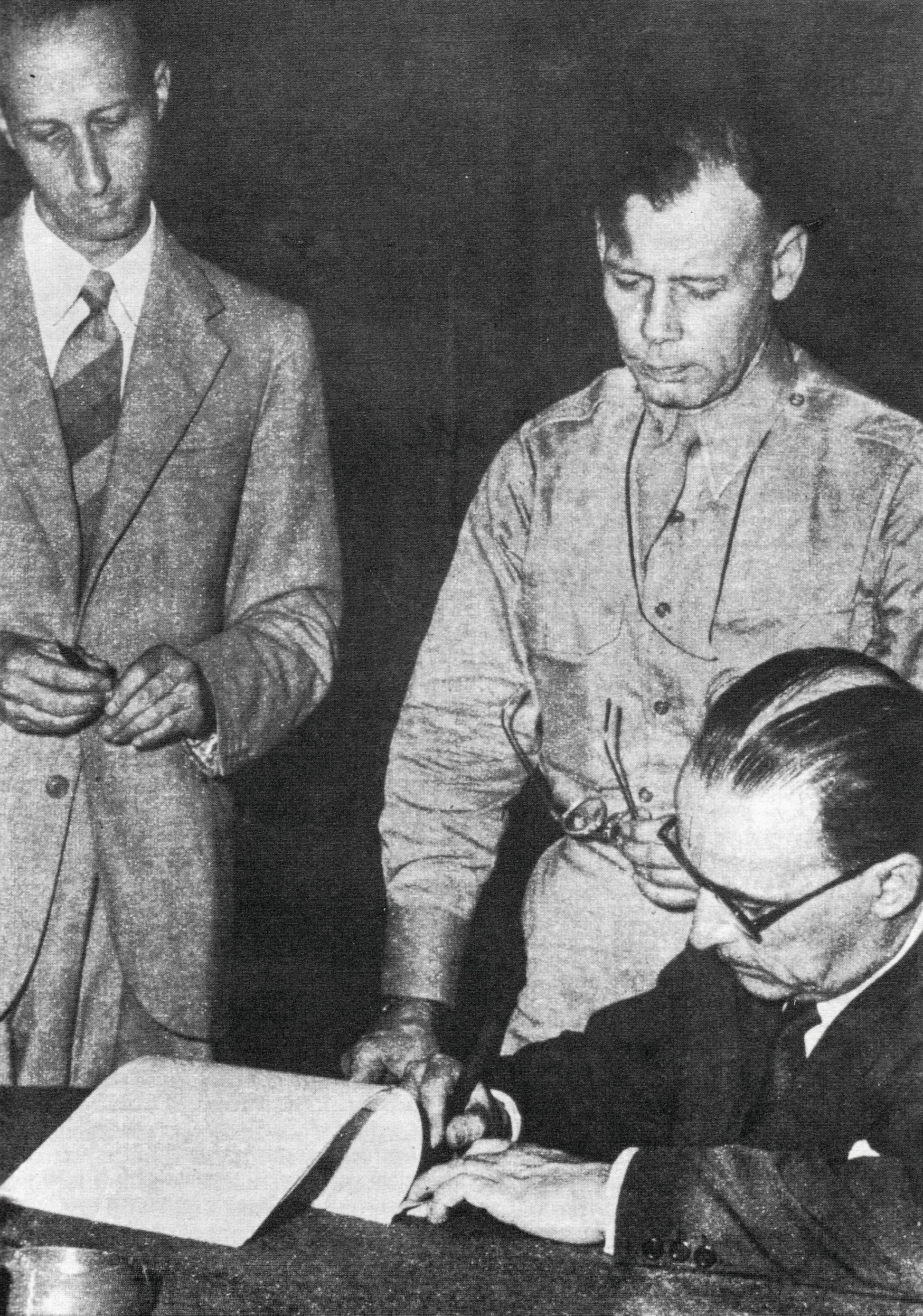
- Generale di Brigata Giuseppe Castellano signing the armistice alongside Franco Montanari and General Walter Bedell Smith
- Type: Armistice
- Signed: 3 September 1943
- Location: Fairfield Camp, Cassibile, Sicily, Italy
- Effective: 8 September 1943
- Condition: Public announcement on 8 September
- Amendment: Supplemented by memorandum of agreement of 23 September 1943
- Replaced by: Armistice of Malta of 29 September 1943
- Signatories: (Kingdom of Italy) Giuseppe Castellano; (United States) Walter Bedell Smith
- Parties: Italy; United States; United Kingdom
- Ratifiers: (Kingdom of Italy) Government of Italy Allied Governments

Full text
- Armistice of Cassibile at Wikisource

The Armistice of Cassibile (Italian: Armistizio di Cassibile) was signed on 3 September 1943 by Italy and the Allies, marking the end of hostilities between them during World War II. The armistice was approved by both Victor Emmanuel III and Marshal Pietro Badoglio, who was serving as Prime Minister of Italy at the time. The signing of the armistice was kept secret on that day, and was announced to the media on 8 September.

It was signed by Major-General Walter Bedell Smith for the Allies and Brigade-General Giuseppe Castellano for Italy, at a summit in an Allied military camp at Cassibile, Sicily, which had recently been occupied by the Allies. Nazi Germany, having anticipated the armistice, responded by attacking Italian forces in Italy, southern France, Greece, Yugoslavia, the Dodecanese, and freeing Benito Mussolini on 12 September. The Italian armed forces were forcefully disbanded in the north and center of the country, with most of Italy being occupied by the Germans, who established a puppet state, the Italian Social Republic led by Mussolini. The king, the Italian government and most of the Navy fled to southern Italy under the protection of the Allies. An Italian resistance movement emerged in German-occupied Italy.

== Background ==
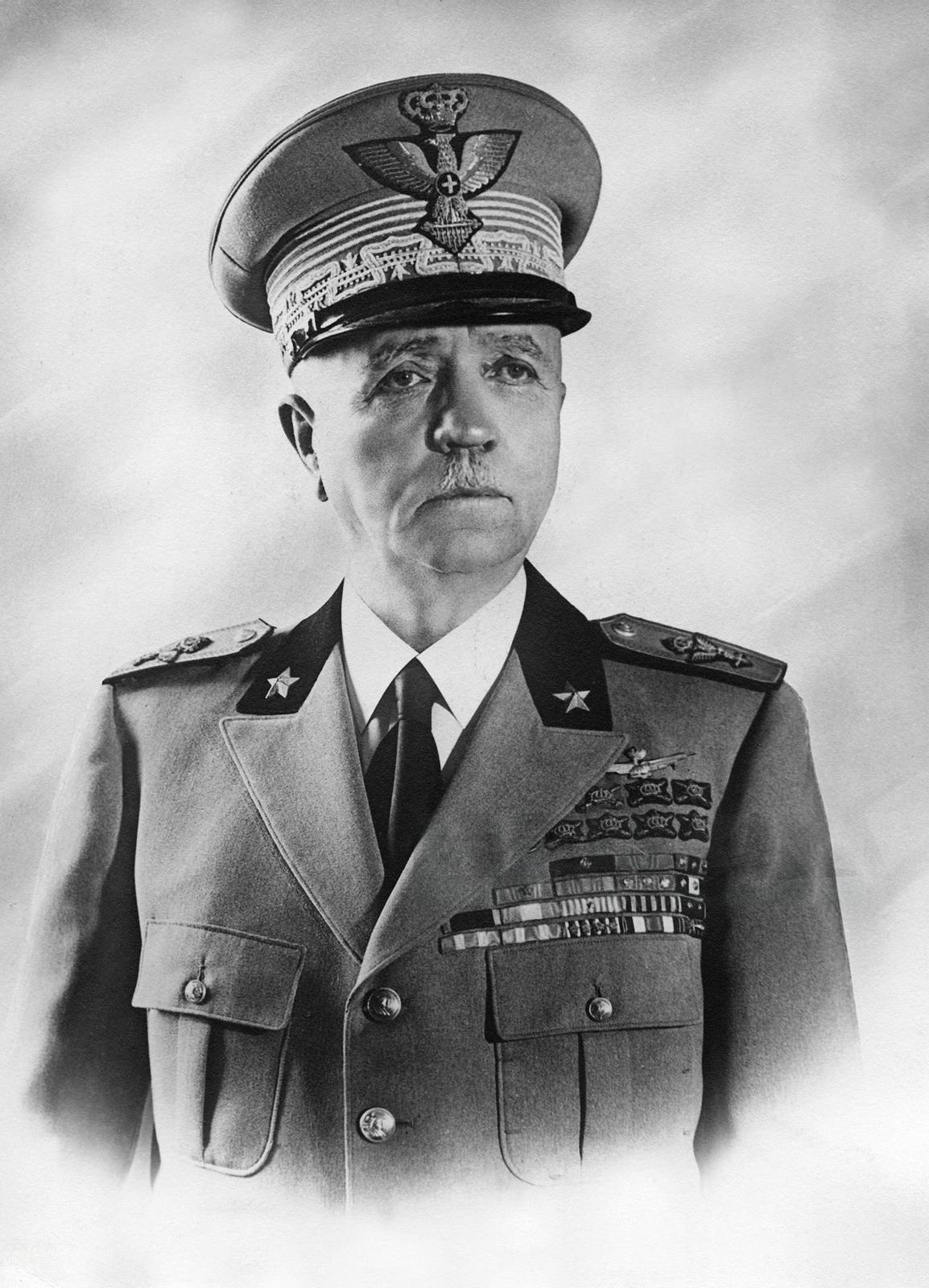
Marshal Pietro Badoglio, the new Prime Minister of Italy after the fall of Mussolini from power

After the surrender of the Axis powers in North Africa on 13 May 1943, the Allies bombed Rome on 16 May, invaded Sicily on 10 July and prepared to land on the Italian mainland.

In the spring of 1943, preoccupied with the disastrous situation of the Italian military during the war, the Italian dictator, Benito Mussolini, removed several figures from the government whom he considered to be more loyal to Victor Emmanuel III than to the Fascist regime.

To help the execution of his plan, the King asked for the assistance of Dino Grandi (1st Count of Mordano), one of the leading members of the Fascist hierarchy who, in his younger years, had been considered the sole credible alternative to Mussolini as leader of the National Fascist Party. The King was also motivated by the suspicion that the Count of Mordano's ideas about Fascism might be changed abruptly. Various ambassadors, including Pietro Badoglio himself, proposed the vague possibility of succeeding Mussolini as dictator.

The secret rebels later involved Giuseppe Bottai, another high member of the Fascist Directorate and Minister of Culture, and Galeazzo Ciano (the 2nd Count of Cortellazzo and Buccari), the second most powerful man in the Fascist Party and Mussolini's son-in-law. The conspirators devised an "Order of the Day" for the next meeting of the Grand Council of Fascism (Gran Consiglio del Fascismo), which contained a proposal to restore direct control of politics to the King. After the Council, held on 25 July 1943, a majority vote adopted the "order of the day", and Mussolini was then summoned to meet the King and was dismissed as prime minister. Upon leaving the meeting, Mussolini was arrested by the carabinieri and spirited off to the island of Ponza. Badoglio became President of the Council of Ministers or the Prime Minister of Italy. However, Grandi had been told that another general of more significant personal and professional qualities (Marshal Enrico Caviglia) would have taken the position. On July 27, the new First Badoglio government began to undertake measures by banning all Fascist organizations throughout Italy as well as disbanding the National Fascist Party and its other elements associated with it.

The appointment of Badoglio did not change the position of Italy as Germany's ally in the war. However, many channels sought a peace treaty with the Allies. Meanwhile, Adolf Hitler sent several divisions south of the Alps, officially to help defend Italy from Allied landings but really to control the country.

Three Italian generals (including Brigade General Giuseppe Castellano) were separately sent to Lisbon to contact Allied diplomats. However, to open the proceedings, the Allies had to determine who was the most authoritative envoy, and the three generals had started to quarrel about who had the highest authority. In the end, Castellano was admitted to speak with the Allies at the British Embassy to set the conditions for the armistice of Italy. Among the representatives of the Allies were the British Ambassador to Portugal, Sir Ronald Hugh Campbell, and two senior officers sent by Dwight Eisenhower: major-general Walter Bedell Smith (US Army, Eisenhower's chief of staff) and brigadier Kenneth Strong (British Army, Eisenhower's assistant chief of staff for intelligence).

On 27 August, General Castellano returned to Italy and, three days later, briefed Badoglio about the Allied request for a meeting to be held in Sicily, which had been suggested by the British Ambassador to the Vatican.

To ease communication between the Allies and the Italian government, a captured British Special Operations Executive (SOE) agent, Dick Mallaby, was released from Verona Prison and secretly moved to the Quirinale. It was vital for the Germans to remain ignorant of any suggestion of Italian surrender, and the SOE was the most secure method under the circumstances.

== Terms ==
Badoglio still considered it possible to gain favourable conditions in exchange for the surrender. He ordered Castellano to insist that any surrender of Italy be conditioned on a landing of Allied troops on the Italian mainland. The Allies held only Sicily and some minor islands.

On 31 August, Brigade General Castellano reached Termini Imerese, in Sicily, by plane and was transferred to Cassibile, a town near Syracuse. It soon became evident that the two sides in the negotiations had adopted somewhat distant positions. Castellano pressed the request for the Italian territory to be defended from the inevitable reaction of the German Wehrmacht against Italy after the signing. In return, he received only vague promises, including launching a parachute division over Rome. Moreover, the actions were to be conducted contemporaneously with the signing, not to precede it, as the Italians had wanted.

The following day, Castellano was received by Badoglio and his entourage. Italy's Foreign Minister, Raffaele Guariglia, declared that the Allied conditions were to be accepted. Other generals, such as Giacomo Carboni, maintained that the Army Corps deployed around Rome was insufficient to protect the city because of the lack of fuel and ammunition and that the armistice had to be postponed. Badoglio did not pronounce himself in the meeting. In the afternoon, he appeared before the King, who decided to accept the armistice conditions.

== Signing ==
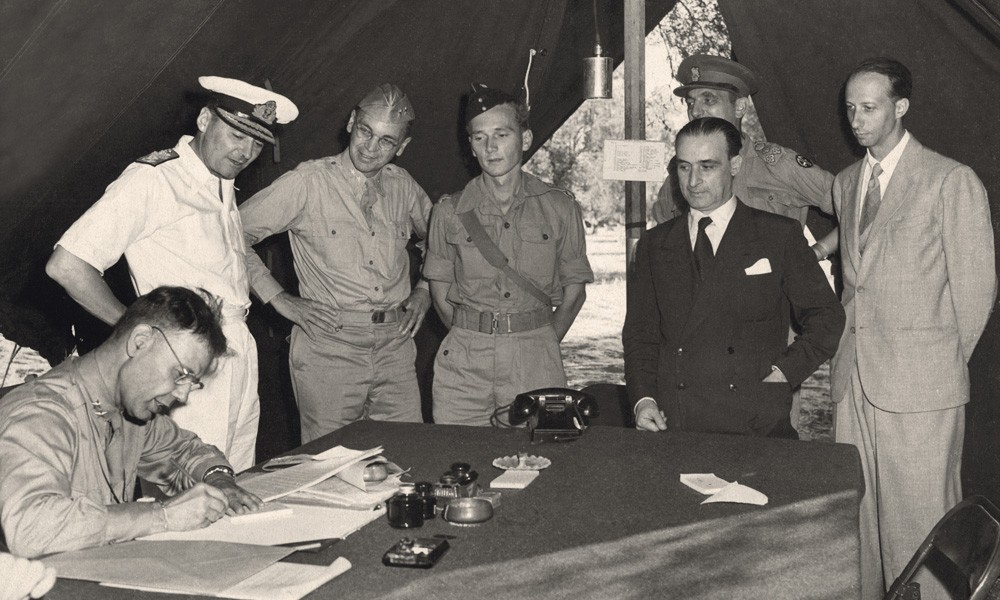
General Walter Bedell Smith signing the armistice with General Giuseppe Castellano and other Allied staffs looking on, in the Fairfield military camp in Cassibile

A confirmation telegram was sent to the Allies. The message, however, was intercepted by the Wehrmacht, the German armed forces, which had long since begun to suspect that Italy was seeking a separate armistice. The Germans contacted Badoglio, who repeatedly confirmed the unwavering loyalty of Italy to its German ally. The Germans doubted his reassurances, and the Wehrmacht started to devise an effective plan, Operation Achse, to take control of Italy as soon as the Italian government had switched allegiance to the Allies.

On 2 September, Castellano set off again to Cassibile with an order to confirm the acceptance of the Allied conditions. He had no written authorization from Badoglio, the head of the Italian government, who wanted to dissociate himself as much as possible from the forthcoming defeat of his country.

The signing ceremony began at 14:00 on 3 September. Castellano and Bedell Smith signed the accepted text on behalf of Badoglio and General Eisenhower, respectively. The armistice includes that all Italian land, air, and naval forces must cease hostilities against the Allies. A bombing mission on Rome by 500 airplanes was stopped at the last moment and had been Eisenhower's inducement to accelerate the procedure of the armistice. Harold Macmillan, the British government's representative minister at the Allied Staff, informed Winston Churchill that the armistice had been signed "without amendments of any kind".

=== Text of the armistice ===
1. Immediate cessation of all hostile activity by the Italian armed forces.
2. Italy will use its best endeavors to deny, to the Germans, facilities that might be used against the United Nations.
3. All prisoners or internees of the United Nations to be immediately turned over to the Allied Commander in Chief, and none of these may now or at any time be evacuated to Germany.
4. Immediate transfer of the Italian Fleet and Italian aircraft to such points as may be designated by the Allied Commander in Chief, with details of disarmament to be prescribed by him.
5. Italian merchant shipping may be requisitioned by the Allied Commander in Chief to meet the needs of his military-naval program.
6. Immediate surrender of Corsica and of all Italian territory, both islands and mainland, to the Allies, for such use as operational bases and other purposes as the Allies may see fit.
7. Immediate guarantee of the free use by the Allies of all airfields and naval ports in Italian territory, regardless of the rate of evacuation of the Italian territory by the German forces. These ports and fields to be protected by Italian armed forces until this function is taken over by the Allies.
8. Immediate withdrawal to Italy of Italian armed forces from all participation in the current war from whatever areas in which they may be now engaged.
9. Guarantee by the Italian Government that if necessary it will employ all its available armed forces to insure prompt and exact compliance with all the provisions of this armistice.
10. The Commander in Chief of the Allied Forces reserves to himself the right to take any measure which in his opinion may be necessary for the protection of the interests of the Allied Forces for the prosecution of the war, and the Italian Government binds itself to take such administrative or other action as the Commander in Chief may require, and in particular the Commander in Chief will establish Allied Military Government over such parts of Italian territory as he may deem necessary in the military interests of the Allied Nations.
11. The Commander in Chief of the Allied Forces will have a full right to impose measures of disarmament, demobilization, and demilitarization.
12. Other conditions of a political, economic and financial nature with which Italy will be bound to comply will be transmitted at a later date.

That evening Castellano met with Allied officers to discuss what the Italian Government should do. General Harold Alexander presided over the meeting with Smith, Lowell Ward Rooks, and John K. Cannon (commander 12th Air Force USAAF), Brigadier General Patrick W. Timberlake (of Mediterranean Air Command), Strong, and General Lyman Lemnitzer (Deputy Chief of Staff, 15th Army Group).

== Relations with Japan ==
Tripartite Pact ally Japan felt betrayed by Italy's decision to leave the war, although relations were already poor due to Japanese demands for Italy to surrender its concessions in China to the Wang Jingwei puppet regime. In September 1943, Japanese forces forcibly took over Italian settlements in China (the Peking legation, and its concessions at Shanhai Pass and Tianjin), confiscated Italian naval vessels, and started to intern Italian nationals across Asia, including diplomats. Some Italian soldiers and sailors who declared loyalty to Italian Social Republic continued fighting alongside Japanese and German personnel.

== Aftermath ==
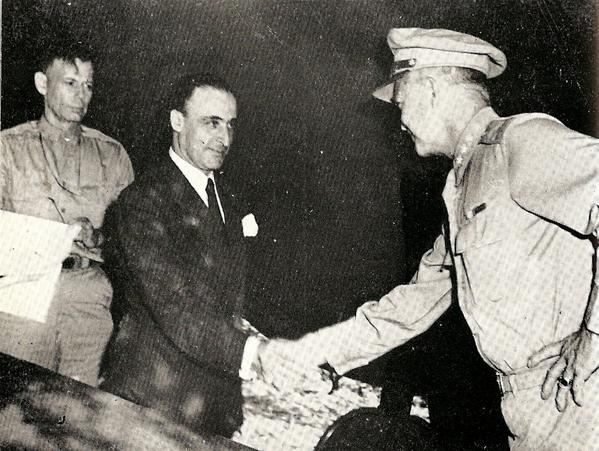
General Giuseppe Castellano shaking hands with General Dwight D. Eisenhower after signing the armistice with General Walter Bedell Smith looking on

Only after the signing had taken place was Castellano passed the long terms contained in the "Instrument of Surrender of Italy", which General Campbell had presented to another Italian general, Zanussi in Lisbon. Zanussi, who had also been in Cassibile since 31 August, for unclear reasons had not informed Castellano about them. Nevertheless, Bedell Smith explained to Castellano that the other conditions would have taken effect only if Italy had not taken on a fighting role in the war alongside the Allies.

On the afternoon of the same day, Badoglio had a briefing with the senior commanders of the Regia Marina (Italy's Royal Navy) and the Regia Aeronautica (Italy's Royal Air Force), with the War Ministers and with the King's representatives. However, he omitted any mention of the signing of the armistice and referred only to ongoing negotiations.

The day the armistice entered into force was linked to a planned landing in central Italy and was left to the Allies' discretion. Castellano still understood that the date was intended to be 12 September, and Badoglio started to move troops to Rome.

On 7 September, a small Allied delegation reached Rome to inform Badoglio that the next day would have been the day of the armistice. He was also informed about the pending arrival of the American 82nd Airborne Division into airports around the city. Badoglio told the delegation that his army was not ready to support the landing and that most airports in the area were under German control. He asked for a deferral of the armistice of a few days. When General Eisenhower learned that, the landing in Rome of American troops was cancelled, but the day of the armistice was confirmed since other troops were already en route by sea to land in southern Italy.

On 8 September, the armistice was announced by Badoglio to the Italian public, later by the Allied radio by Eisenhower. German forces immediately attacked Italian forces by executing Operation Achse. Most of the Regio Esercito (Italian Royal Army) had not been informed about the armistice, and no clear orders had been issued about the line of conduct to be taken in the face of the German armed forces. Some Italian divisions that should have defended Rome were still in transit from southern France. The king, along with the royal family and Badoglio, fled Rome on the early morning of the 9th and took shelter in Brindisi, in southern Italy. Their initial intention was to move army headquarters out of Rome with the King and the Prime Minister, but few staff officers reached Brindisi. Meanwhile, the Italian troops, without instructions, collapsed and were soon overwhelmed. Some small units decided to stay loyal to the German ally. From 8 to 12 September, the German forces occupied all of the Italian territory that was still not under Allied control, except Sardinia and part of Apulia, without meeting organized resistance. In Rome, an Italian governor, with the support of an Italian infantry division, nominally ruled the city until 23 September, but in practice, the city was under German control from 11 September.

On 3 September, British and Canadian troops crossed the Strait of Messina and began landing in the southernmost tip of Calabria during Operation Baytown. The day after the armistice had been made public, 9 September, the Allies made landings at Salerno and at Taranto.

The Allies failed to take full advantage of the Italian armistice and were quickly checked by German troops. In terrain that favoured defence, the Allied forces took 20 months to reach the northern borders of Italy.

Some of the Italian troops based outside Italy, in the occupied Balkans and Greek islands, held out some weeks after the armistice. Still, without any determined support from the Allies, all had been overwhelmed by the Germans by the end of September 1943. On the island of Cephalonia, the Italian Acqui Division was massacred after it had resisted German forces. A similar fate awaited 103 Italian officers of the 50th Infantry Division Regina on the island of Kos, who were shot in early October 1943 after the Germans captured the island. Only on the islands of Leros and Samos, with British reinforcements, would the resistance last until November 1943, and in Corsica, Italian troops forced the German troops to leave the island.

In other cases, individual Italian units, mostly more minor, remained loyal to the Axis powers. Many of the units formed the nucleus of the armed forces of the puppet Italian Social Republic.

== Regia Marina ==
Both the Regio Esercito (Italian Royal Army) and the Regia Aeronautica (Italian Royal Air Force) virtually disintegrated with the announcement of the armistice on 8 September. The Allies coveted the Regia Marina (Italian Royal Navy), with its 206 ships in total, including the battleships Roma, Vittorio Veneto, and Italia (known as Littorio until July 1943). There was a danger that some of the Navy might fight on, be scuttled, or (most concerningly for the Allies) end up in German hands. As such, the truce called for Italian warships on Italy's west coast, mostly at La Spezia and Genoa, to sail for North Africa and to pass Corsica and Sardinia and for those at Taranto, in the heel of Italy, to sail for Malta.

At 02:30, on 9 September, the three battleships Roma, Vittorio Veneto, and Italia shoved off from La Spezia escorted by three light cruisers and eight destroyers. When German troops, who had stormed into the town to prevent the ships from sailing, became enraged by the ships' escape, "they rounded up and summarily shot several Italian captains who, unable to get their vessels underway, had scuttled them". That afternoon, German bombers attacked the ships sailing without air cover off Sardinia and launching guided bombs. Several ships suffered damage, and Roma sank with the loss of nearly 1,400 men. Most of the remaining ships made it safely to North Africa while three destroyers and a cruiser which had stopped to rescue survivors, docked in Menorca in Spain.

The Navy's turnover proceeded more smoothly in other areas of Italy. When an Allied naval force headed for the large naval base of Taranto, it watched a flotilla of Italian ships sailing out of Taranto Harbour towards their surrender at Malta.

An agreement between the Allies and the Italians in late September provided for some of the Navy to be kept in commission; however, the battleships were to be reduced to care and maintenance and effectively disarmed. Italian mercantile marine vessels were to operate under the same general conditions as the Allies. In all cases, the Italian vessels would retain their Italian crews and fly Italian flags.

== The 'long armistice' ==
The armistice signed at Cassibile was considered the 'shorter' version of the whole armistice. On 29 September, the longer version of the armistice was signed at Malta between Italy and the Allies. It was signed by Badoglio and Eisenhower aboard the British battleship HMS Nelson. The agreement included that Benito Mussolini and his Fascist officials must be handed over to the United Nations, and all Italian land, air, and naval forces must surrender unconditionally. The armistice signed at Malta was considered the Additional Conditions for the Armistice with Italy and Long Armistice by the Italians, but for the Allies it was referred to as the Instrument of Surrender of Italy.

== See also ==
- Japanese Instrument of Surrender
- German Instrument of Surrender
- Badoglio Proclamation
- Treaty of Peace with Italy, 1947
