= Badoglio Proclamation =

1943 announcement of armistice

The Badoglio Proclamation was a speech read on Ente Italiano per le Audizioni Radiofoniche (EIAR) at 19:42 on 8 September 1943 by Marshal Pietro Badoglio, Italian head of government, announcing that the Armistice of Cassibile between Italy and the Allies signed on the 3rd of September had come into force. It followed a speech on Radio Algiers by U.S. General Dwight D. Eisenhower at 18:30 (17:30 Algerian time) also announcing the armistice.

== Text ==
The Italian government, recognising the impossibility of continuing the unequal struggle against an overwhelming enemy force, in order to avoid further and graver disasters for the Nation, sought an armistice from general Eisenhower, commander-in-chief of the Anglo-American Allied forces. The request was granted. Consequently, all acts of hostility against the Anglo-American force by Italian forces must cease everywhere. But they will react to possible attacks from any other source.

== Results ==
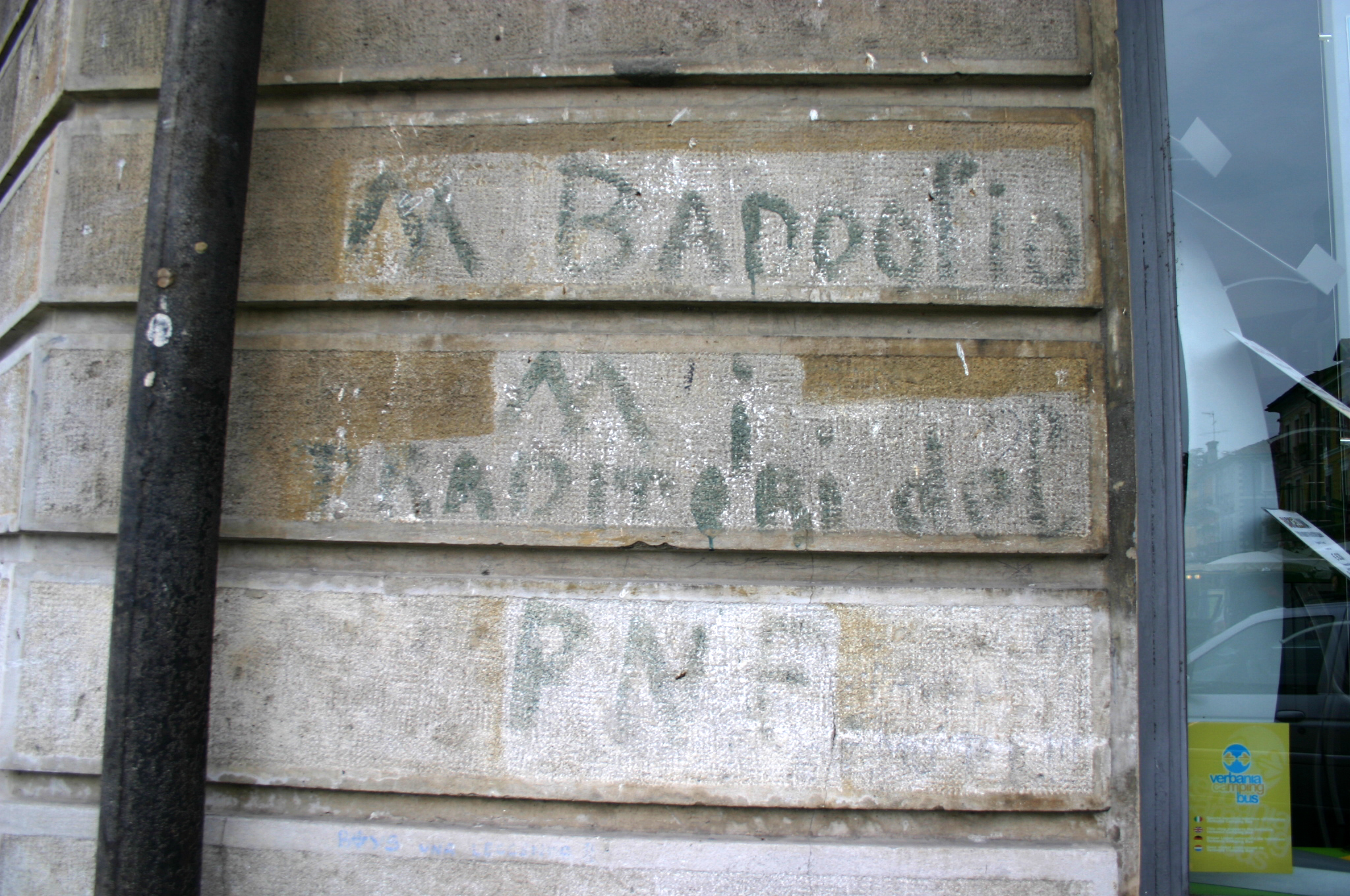
Anti-Badoglio graffiti in Verbania-Pallanza (piazza del Municipio), after the whitewash painted over it had faded, reading Down with Badoglio, down with traitors to the PNF

The abandonment of Rome by the military high command, the head of government Badoglio, King Victor Emmanuel III and the king's son, Crown Prince Umberto, their move towards Pescara then Brindisi, and above all the proclamation's use of a format which did not give the clauses of the armistice in a clearly comprehensible form (which was largely wrongly interpreted as meaning a complete end to the war) all led to confusion. This was particularly so among the Italian Armed Forces on all fronts, who remained unaware of the armistice's precise content and disbanded themselves. Over 600,000 Italian soldiers were captured by the German army and sent to various prisoner-of-war camps under the designation I.M.I. (internati militari italiani, or Italian Military Internees) in the weeks immediately after the announcement. More than half of all Italian soldiers laid down their arms and returned home (as referred to in the title of the 1960 film set at the time, Tutti a casa). The Italian and German high commands intercepted the Eisenhower broadcast first and so the Germans immediately put Operation Achse into effect to disarm their former allies and occupy the whole Italian Peninsula, on 9 September sinking the Italian battleship Roma, which had been ordered on the night of 8 September to sail with the entire Italian fleet to Malta in accordance with the armistice's clauses, under the cover-story of attacking the Allied forces landing at Salerno in Operation Baytown.

At the same time part of the Italian armed forces decided to remain loyal to the king, giving rise to the Italian resistance (one of whose first examples ended in the massacre of the 33rd Infantry Division "Acqui" on Cephalonia by the Germans) and part joined the free individuals, parties and movements such as the Brigata Maiella. Other branches, especially in the north, such as the Xª Flottiglia MAS, decided to remain loyal to fascist Italy and the Germans. Despite the proclamation, the Allies thwarted a massive and immediate release of Italian prisoners of war loyal to the Italian king and the Badoglio regime, to avoid their possibly rejoining the Fascist forces in northern Italy.

== Bibliography ==
- (in Italian) Elena Aga-Rossi, Una nazione allo sbando. L'armistizio italiano del settembre 1943 e le sue conseguenze. Bologna, Il Mulino, 2003
- (in Italian) Silvio Bertoldi, Apocalisse italiana. Otto settembre 1943. Fine di una nazione. Milano, Rizzoli, 1998.
- (in Italian) Davide Lajolo, Il voltagabbana. 1963
- (in Italian) Oreste Lizzadri, Il regno di Badoglio. Milano, Edizioni Avanti!, 1963
- (in Italian) Luigi Longo, Un popolo alla macchia. Milano, Mondadori, 1952
- (in Italian) Paolo Monelli, Roma 1943. Torino, Einaudi, 1993
- (in Italian) Ruggero Zangrandi, 1943: 25 luglio–8 settembre. Milano, Feltrinelli, 1964
- (in Italian) Ruggero Zangrandi, Il lungo viaggio attraverso il fascismo. Milano, Feltrinelli, 1976
- (in Italian) Ruggero Zangrandi, L'Italia tradita. 8 settembre 1943. Milano, Mursia, 1995
