= Hatchet man (idiom) =

Person trusted to destroy political opponents

In the context of the Watergate scandal, the term hatchet man was used to refer to a trusted and particularly orthodox subordinate tasked by his employer with destroying a political opponent by any means necessary. Charles Colson was known as a hatchet man for President Richard Nixon, as was H.R. Haldeman, who proudly described himself as "Richard Nixon's 'son of a bitch'". This use of the term has since become commonplace for anyone who is tasked with conducting distasteful, illegal, or unfair "dirty work" to protect the reputation or power of their employer.

== Usage ==
- "Besides being the acting secretary, Conner was former President George W. Bush’s hatchet man on payments limits until Congress finally said enough and overrode two vetoes of the farm bill. Chuck Hassebrook has been making those same arguments for 35 years." (2009)
- "Of all the men around former President Richard Nixon, probably none was more hated than Chuck Colson, top hatchet man and tireless inventor of dirty tricks." (1976)
- "In an interview in January 2013 on CNN's Piers Morgan Tonight, conspiracy theorist Alex Jones called Piers Morgan a "hatchet man of the New World Order" for his stance in favor of increased gun control in the United States".
