= 34th Pursuit Squadron =

34th Pursuit Squadron

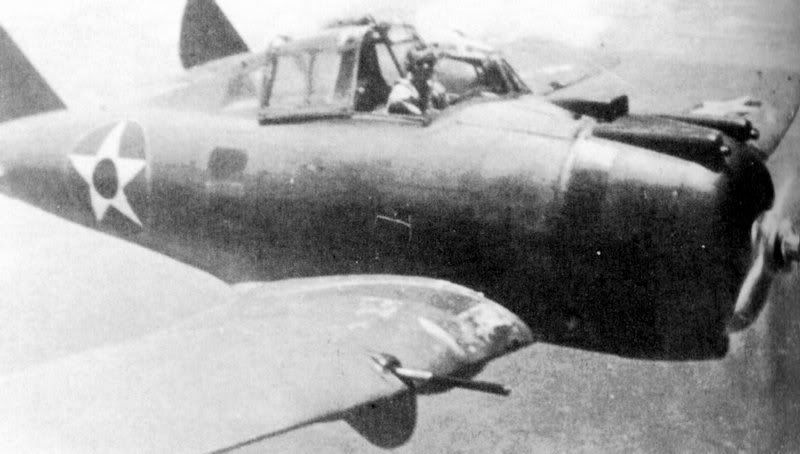
- Lt. Lloyd Stinson, 34th Pursuit Squadron Seversky P-35A in combat over the Philippines, 1941.
- Active: 1940–1946 (Not manned or equipped after May 1942)
- Country: United States
- Branch: United States Air Force
- Role: Pursuit
- Part of: Far East Air Force
- Engagements: Philippine Islands (1941–1942)
- Decorations: Distinguished Unit Citations: Philippines, 7 December 1941 – 10 May 1942; Philippines, 8–12 December 1941; Philippines, 6 January – 8 March 1942; Philippine Presidential Unit Citation

The 34th Pursuit Squadron is an inactive United States Air Force unit. It was wiped out in the Battle of the Philippines (1941–42). The survivors fought as infantry during Battle of Bataan and after their surrender, were subjected to the Bataan Death March, although some did escape to Australia. The unit was never remanned or equipped. It was carried as an active unit until 2 April 1946.

== History ==
=== Origins ===
The squadron was organized at Kelly Field, Texas on 22 December 1939 and assigned to the 28th Composite Group. Activated on 1 February 1940 and equipped with P-36 Hawks for training as a part of the Air Corps buildup of forces after the outbreak of World War II in Europe.

The squadron was reassigned to Hamilton Field, California on 30 November 1940, and trained as part of the west coast defense forces. As part of the buildup of forces in the Philippines in the fall of 1941, it was relieved from the 28th CG, and the personnel of the squadron (without equipment) moved to the Port of Entry, San Francisco, California and departed on the SS President Coolidge, arriving in Manila, Philippine Islands on 20 November 1941.

The 35th Pursuit Group was scheduled to move from Moffett Field, California to reinforce Far East Air Force, and the 34th was concurrently attached to the 24th Pursuit Group in the Philippines, awaiting for the 35th to arrive. Upon arrival it was assigned to Del Carmen Field, Luzon, with the 21st Pursuit Squadron transferring its Seversky P-35A fighters to the squadron. The P-35As were manufactured originally for the Swedish Air Force. On 24 October 1940, President Franklin Roosevelt signed an executive order requisitioning all the undelivered EP-106 aircraft and impressing them into the USAAC. These were designated P-35A by the Army, and 40 planes were sent to the Philippines during 1941 to bolster the islands' defenses.

=== Battle of the Philippines ===
On 8 December 1941, when the Japanese launched the first air attacks on the Philippines, the P-35A fighters were an important part of the first line of defense of these islands. After the initial Japanese strikes on Clark and Nichols Fields, the Japanese struck at Del Carmen. With only a few minutes notice of the attack, the 34th pursuit pilots prepared to meet the enemy formations. However, the P-35As were completely inadequate for the task. By late 1941 standards, the P-35A was hopelessly obsolescent. It was too lightly armed and lacked either armor around the cockpit or self-sealing fuel tanks. Consequently, the squadron pilots stood little chance against the Japanese Zero fighters and were badly mauled. Most of the aircraft were quickly shot down in combat or else were destroyed on the ground. By 12 December, there were only eight airworthy P-35As left.

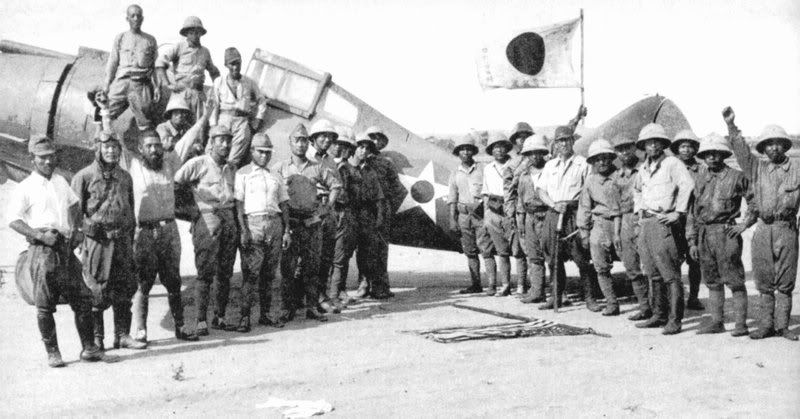
Captured Japanese photo of a 34th Pursuit Squadron P-35A sized at Orani Airfield by Japanese Forces

By 20 December orders were received to move south to the Bataan Peninsula, and the five remaining aircraft of the 34th attempted to fly to Bataan from Lubao Airfield, but two were shot down as they attempted to land, and a third was destroyed in place when no volunteer could be found to fly it. The last two aircraft of the squadron were flown south to Mindanao on 11 January 1942, transporting several unit personnel in their luggage compartments. Remaining ground personnel of the squadron were ordered into ground combat. As an infantry unit, the men were engaged in beach defense of the Bataan peninsula.

The last recorded actions by the squadron was on 4 April when the two aircraft briefly returned to Bataan Airfield to evacuate other personnel. One was lost crash landing on Cebu on 10 April. Without any remaining pilots, the sole surviving 34th P-35A was turned over to a Capt. Ramon Zosa of the Philippine Army Air Corps on 30 April, and flew its last sortie out of Del Monte Airfield, accompanying a P-40 on a strafing attack of Japanese landings at Macajalar Bay on 3 May. With the collapse of organized United States resistance in the Philippines on 8 May 1942, a few surviving members of the squadron managed to escape from Mindanao to Australia where they were integrated into existing units.

The 34th Pursuit Squadron was never re-manned after the battle. it was simply left on the active list of Fifth Air Force organizations throughout the war. It was inactivated on 2 April 1946; the squadron designation has never been reactivated by the United States Air Force.

== Lineage ==
- Constituted as the 34th Pursuit Squadron (Interceptor) on 22 December 1939

Activated on 1 February 1940
Inactivated on 2 April 1946.

=== Assignments ===
- 28th Composite Group, 1 February 1940
- 35th Pursuit Group, 30 November 1940 – 15 January 1942

Attached to 24th Pursuit Group, 1 October 1941 – 2 April 1946

=== Stations ===
- Kelly Field, Texas, 1 February 1940
- Hamilton Field, California, 30 November 1940– October 1941
- Del Carmen Field, Luzon, Philippines, 1 November 1941
- Bataan Airfield, Luzon, Philippines, c. 25 December 1941– April 1942

Air echelon operated from: Del Monte Airfield, Mindanao, Philippines. 8 April–May 1942

=== Aircraft ===
- P-36 Hawk, 1940–1941
- Seversky P-35A, 1941–1942.
