= 24th Pursuit Group =

24th Pursuit Group

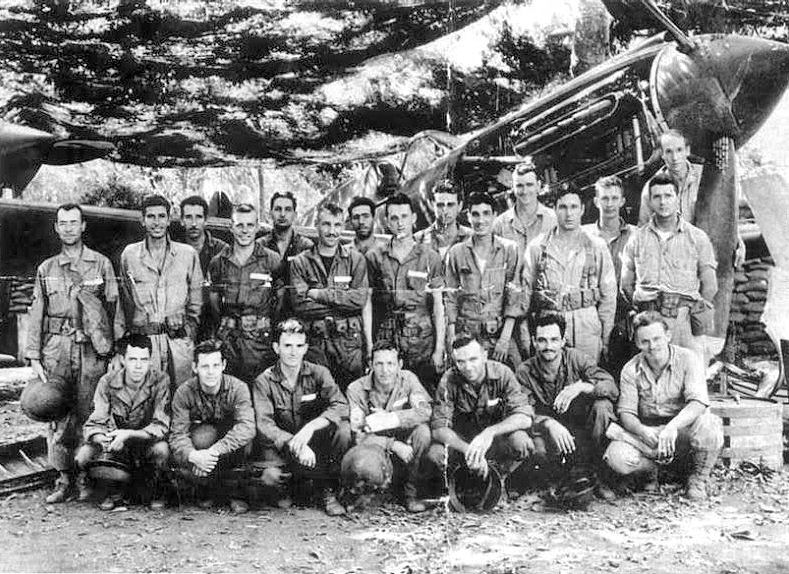
- Group members and one of the last Curtiss P-40Es of the 24th Pursuit Group, taken at Bataan Airfield in early 1942 during the Battle of the Philippines (note the camouflage netting).
- Active: 1 October 1941 – 2 April 1946 (Not equipped or manned, May 1942 – 2 April 1946)
- Country: United States
- Branch: United States Army Air Forces
- Role: Pursuit
- Part of: Far East Air Force
- Engagements: World War II Philippine Islands (1941–1942)

- Decorations: Distinguished Unit Citations; Philippines, 7 December 1941 – 10 May 1942; Philippines, 8–12 December 1941; Philippines, 6 January – 8 March 1942 Philippine Presidential Unit Citation

Commanders
- Notable commanders: Colonel Orrin L. Grover, 1 October 1941 – April 1942

The 24th Pursuit Group is an inactive United States Air Force unit. It was wiped out in the Battle of the Philippines (1941–42). The survivors fought as infantry during Battle of Bataan and after their surrender, were subjected to the Bataan Death March, although some did escape to Australia. The unit was never remanned or equipped. It was carried as an active unit until 2 April 1946.

== History ==
=== Organization ===
The Group was activated in the Philippine Islands on 1 October 1941, taking over the three pursuit squadrons (3d, 17th and 20th) of the inactivated 4th Composite Group. The group was equipped with Seversky P-35As and several models of Curtiss P-40s, this group comprised the only pursuit force in the Philippines in December 1941.

During the month of October, 35 new pilots arrived from Randolph Field, Texas which brought the 24th up to full strength. These pilots were sent to Pursuit transition unit at Clark which trained them for combat duty. In November 1941, the 24th was augmented by two attached squadrons (21st and 34th) which were sent from the 35th Pursuit Group at Hamilton Field, California. Also in November, a number of additional P-40Es were sent to the Group, which equipped the 3d, 17th and 21st Squadrons. The 34th Pursuit Squadron was assigned P-35A, the remainder of the P-35s being sent to the Philippines Air Corps.

=== Eve of war ===
Notice was received by the group on 15 November that due to the tense international situation between the United States and the Japanese Empire, all pursuit aircraft on the flight line would be placed on alert 24 hours each day, be armed, and be fully fueled with pilots available on 30 minutes' notice. During the period 30 November to 6 December all squadrons underwent intensive training in day and night enemy interception and air-to-air gunnery. Also training in escorting B-17 Flying Fortresses of the 19th Bombardment Group was undertaken.

During the first days of December, on four consecutive nights (2d-6th) an unidentified aircraft was sighted over Clark Field at approximately 05:30. After the first sighting, instructions were given to force the aircraft to land or destroy it. On three succeeding nights it was impossible to make the interception, due to the inability to see the aircraft in the dark or the aircraft not getting close enough to be picked up by the ground searchlights. On the fifth morning all aircraft were kept on the ground and the anti-aircraft batteries were alerted for the interception; however the aircraft was not located. During this same period, many other undetermined aircraft were tracked by Iba Radar.

On the night of 7 December 1941, the 24th Pursuit Group status was reported to Far East Air Force as follows:

- 3rd Pursuit Squadron at Iba Field, 18 P-40Es in commission
- 17th Pursuit Squadron at Nichols Field, 18 P-40Es in commission
- 20th Pursuit Squadron at Clark Field, 18 P-40Es in commission
- 21st Pursuit Squadron at Nichols Field, had 18 P-40Bs in commission
- 34th Pursuit Squadron at Del Carmen Field had 18 P-35As in commission

=== 8 December 1941 ===
On 8 December at about 03:30 the commercial radio station at Clark Field intercepted a message from Pearl Harbor, Hawaii about the Japanese attack there. However the group was unable to verify this interception through official channels, no other action was taken other than notifying the Base Commander. However, all squadrons were put on alert.

At about 04:00 the radar at Iba Field reported a formation of unidentified aircraft approximately 75 miles off the West Coast of Luzon heading towards Corregidor. The 3d Pursuit Squadron was dispatched to intercept the formation, but no planes were sighted and the squadron returned to Iba. However, the radar tracks showed the interception was successful and the unidentified aircraft swung off to the west out of the range of the Radar. It was believed that the 3d went underneath the formation. At 04:45 notification was received of a state of war between the United States and the Japanese Empire.

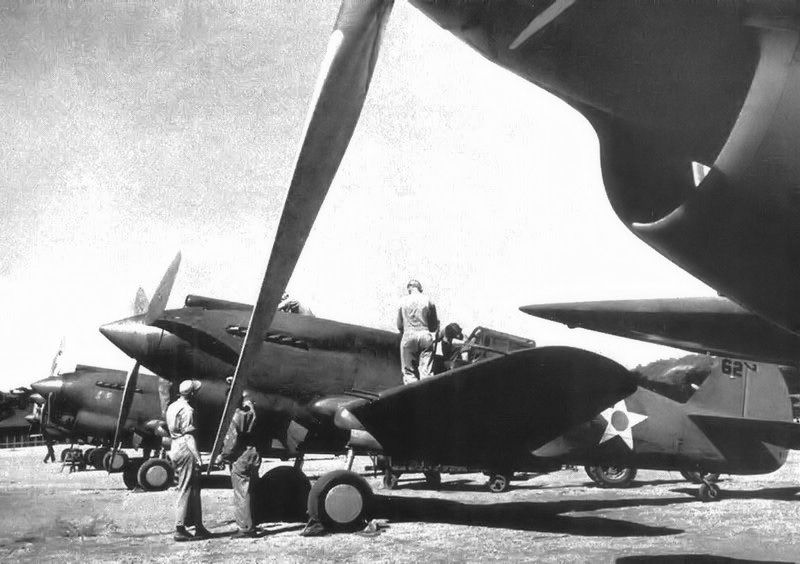
21st Pursuit Squadron Curtiss P-40B Warhawks Clark Field, Field, Luzon, 1941

At approximately 09:30, a large formation of Japanese bombers was spotted over Lingayen Gulf reported heading towards Manila. The 20th Pursuit Squadron was immediately dispatched to intercept the formation over Roselas. The 17th Pursuit Squadron was ordered from Nichols Field to cover the airspace over Clark. Again, the interception was not successful, as the bombers turned to the northeast and attacked Baguio and Tuguegarao then headed north off the radar. Both squadrons returned to their stations and were refueled and put back on alert.

Again at approximately 11:30 a large formation of bombers was reported over the China Sea heading towards Manila. The 3d was again dispatched to intercept; the 17th was dispatched to cover Bataan and the 34th was placed on a standing patrol over Manila. Uncertainties of time and place, however, made it doubtful if the 3d would accomplish the interception. At 11:45 an unverified report was received of another bomber formation over Lingayen Gulf, heading south. The 20th was still being refueled and was unable to take off, so the 21st was ordered to cover Clark Field. At 12:15 the 20th completed refueling and was also ordered to cover Clark, At 12:20 54 Japanese bombers and an undetermined number of naval dive bombers attacked Clark Field. The 20th was in the process of taking off when the attack came. Only 4 squadron aircraft had cleared the runway, another five were destroyed on the ground while taking off. The remaining 5 planes were destroyed by a strafing attack after the bombardment. At the time of the attack on Clark Field, four squadrons of pursuit planes were in the air, but a complete breakdown of communications occurred when the communications center at Clark was destroyed by a bomb and little more than a dozen American aircraft met the Japanese attackers, none of which could climb to the altitude of the bombers As a result, the 17th and 21st planes over Manila were not notified of the attack. The P-35s at Del Carmen Field took to the air after seeing the clouds of smoke over Clark Field, but were no match for the Japanese Zeros, which were much faster and more maneuverable. Although none were shot down, all were damaged and its use as a pursuit fighter ended.

Clark Field, the main air base on Luzon was devastated, and nearly half of Far East Air Force's aircraft were destroyed on the ground, and a third of the 24th Pursuit Group's aircraft lost in the attack. Clark Field was so heavily damaged it was essentially eliminated as an effective combat airfield.

The 3d Pursuit Squadron, which was dispatched to intercept a formation of planes over the China Sea failed to make the interception and was returning to its base at Iba. Iba, however was plotting an incoming formation and was transmitting the information to the Air Warning Center at Nielson Field. However, due to a communications breakdown the 3d was unaware of the incoming formation and as they were circling Iba Field on their landing approach, 54 Japanese bombers and an unknown number of Naval dive bombers approached the field. The 3d broke the landing formation and attacked the incoming enemy aircraft. In the ensuing battle, one enemy bomber was shot down and a number of strafing aircraft were claimed to have been destroyed. The 3d lost five P-40s in the air. Although the 3d was unable to prevent to bombing of Iba Field, it did prevent the strafing of the ground station. After the Japanese raid, three additional P-40s were forced to crash land on the beaches after running out of fuel. The remainder of the squadron landed at the O'Donnell airport, but were forced to remain there until ammunition and gasoline were dispatched from Clark Field. Iba Field and three additional planes on the ground in Iba hangars for maintenance were completely destroyed by the enemy bombardment.

=== December 1941 ===
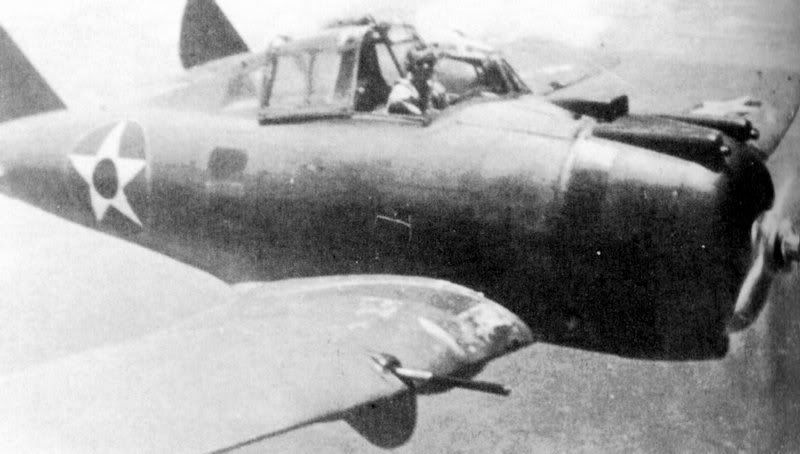
Lt. Lloyd Stinson, 34th Pursuit Squadron Seversky P-35A in combat over the Philippines, 1941.

On 9 December shortly after midnight, telephonic communications were re-established with Headquarters, FEAF. Intelligence reported that an unidentified number of enemy aircraft were approaching from the north. A flight of six P-40s from the 17th Pursuit Squadron was dispatched from Del Carmen to intercept. However two of the aircraft were demolished on takeoff due to an accident. The remaining planes proceeded to Nichols Field but were unable to accomplish any interception of enemy aircraft in the dark. For the remainder of the day, the only activity was miscellaneous elements of Japanese ships patrolling and aircraft reconnoitering, and the night bombing of Nichols Field at 03:15.

In order to try to bring some of the units up to strength, the P-40s of the 17th were transferred to Clark Field along with some P-40s from the 3d Pursuit Squadron which were moved from Iba Field. The remainder of the 3d was sent to Nichols Field to bring the 34th with its P-35s up to strength.

On the night of the 10th, a Japanese invasion convoy was reported approaching Lingayen Bay. The 17th and 34th Pursuit Squadrons were readied to attack the convoy at daylight and furnish cover for some B-17s that were repaired and put back on the line at Clark to join in the attack. The B-17s took off with the 17th providing top cover during the attack. P-35s from the 34th failed to reach the objective due to their low speed, and only at the end of the attack did the 34th proceed to attack the convoy. Two P-35s were lost, one when the plane flew into a large explosion on a ship the aircraft attacked as the pilot was passing over it. After the attack, both squadrons returned for re-fueling and re-arming and went back on alert. Later that morning at 11:15 a warning was received of large formations of Japanese aircraft approaching from the north. The 17th was dispatched to intercept the planes over Manila Bay, the 34th was sent over Manila to cover the port area. The 21st was sent for interception over the Bataan Peninsula. Contact was made with the enemy aircraft by all three squadrons, an estimated 100+ Japanese aircraft with fighters escorting the bombers. The interceptors of the 24th were attacked by the escort Zeros and were unable to attack the bombers due to the large number of enemy fighter strength. Only two planes were able to attack the bombers, after they carried out their attacks. The other squadrons engaged in dog-fighting over Manila Bay until they were forced to land, out of gasoline.

At the end of the 10th, Group fighter strength had been reduced to about 30 aircraft, with 8 being P-35s. Due to the depleted strength of the Group, orders were received from FEAF Headquarters that pursuit planes were not to be dispatched other than upon orders from Headquarters. The planes would be employed mainly as reconnaissance aircraft to replace the 2d Observation Squadron, which was made inoperable after being mostly destroyed on the ground. Its remaining planes were unarmed and sitting ducks if attacked.

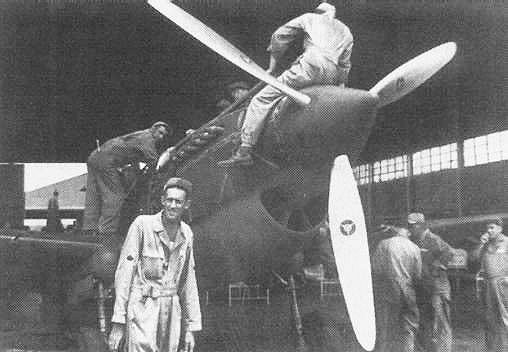
21st Pursuit Squadron P-40Bs being serviced at Clark Field, Luzon.

In the days that followed, the 24th flew patrol and reconnaissance missions in various areas. The 3d and 34th squadrons were combined to cover the southern part of Luzon. The 17th and 20th were used to cover the northern part of the Island. The 21st was non-operational. However, occasional attacks were made in the course of these reconnaissance missions. Lt. Wagner, while performing a reconnaissance mission over Aparri, strafed the captured airport there and shot down four enemy aircraft in the area. The strafing also destroyed a number of aircraft on the ground. Lt Mahoney, on a reconnaissance mission over Legaspi, strafed the airport there and destroyed several enemy aircraft on the ground. He also destroyed the enemy radio station as well as a fuel dump.

With no supplies or replacements available from the United States, ground crews, with little or no spares for repairing aircraft, used parts which were cannibalized from wrecks. Essentials, such as oil, was reused, with used oil being strained though makeshift filters, and tailwheel tires were stuffed with rags to keep them usable. The aircraft which were flying and engaging the Japanese seemed to have more bullethole patches on the fuselage than original skin.

On the morning of 23 December the Japanese made a landing in San Miguel Bay along the east coast of Lingayen Gulf. All available aircraft of the 24th were loaded with fragmentation bombs and dispatched to attack the enemy landing. Twelve P-40s and six P-35s was the entire striking force of the Group. The attack was made with a loss of two of the P-35s which were shot down by anti-aircraft fire and it proved sufficient to create confusion among enemy personnel in landing barges and around supply dumps ashore.

=== Spring 1942 ===
for additional information, see: Bataan Airfield

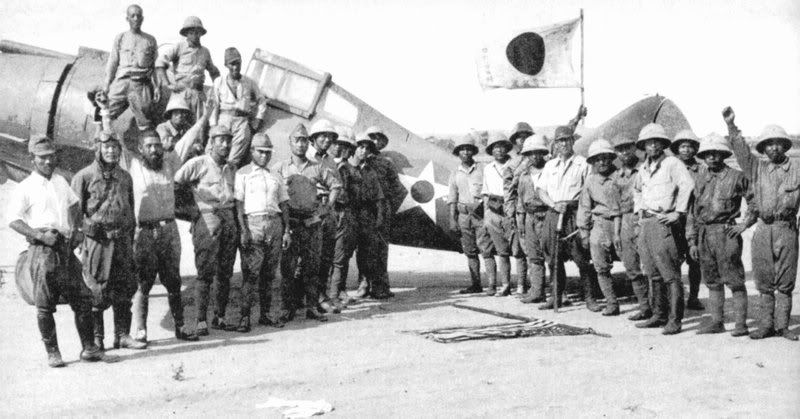
Captured Japanese photo of a 34th Pursuit Squadron P-35A sized at Orani Airfield by Japanese Forces, 1942

The ground combat situation on Luzon quickly became desperate when a second set of major landings occurred along the shore of Lamon Bay in southern Luzon. With the withdrawal from Clark Field on 20 December, the 24th used dispersed landing fields on Luzon, some little more than grass to carry on the fight. Japanese forces were rapidly advancing from both the north and south. MacArthur ordered all American and Philippine forces to withdraw to the Bataan Peninsula and all FEAF aircraft to withdraw from Clark and Nichols Fields.

Field order No. 4, HQ Philippines Department on 10 January 1942 appointed the ground echelons of the 24th Pursuit Group as the 2d Infantry Regiment (Provisional) of the 71st Division. The unit was ordered to establish defenses on the beach of the peninsula.

- The ground echelon of the 3d Pursuit Squadron was moved from Nichols Field to Organi, then to the mouth of the Talan River where the men took up a position as ground troops on beach defense.
- The ground echelon of the 20th Pursuit Squadron, was moved to Pilar, and from there to the Mariveles cut-off on the Tanikan River, where they assumed the role of regimental reserves.
- The ground echelon of the 17th Pursuit Squadron was moved from Nichols Field and Manila to Pilar and from there to Kabobo point where the took up beach defenses.
- The ground echelon of the 21st Pursuit Squadron moved from Lububo to KM Post 184 where they went into position as regimental reserve.
- The ground echelon of the 34th Pursuit Squadron was moved from Del Carmen Field to Orani, and from there to Aglaloma Point where it went into position on beach defense.

What was left of the group were based at temporary fields at Orani and Pilar in northern Bataan, and later withdrawn on 8 January to "Bataan Field," located several miles from the southern tip of the peninsula. Bataan field consisted of a dirt runway, hacked out of the jungle by Army engineers in early 1941 and lengthened after the FEAF was ordered into Bataan. However, it was well camouflaged. It was attacked and strafed daily by the Japanese, however no aircraft were lost on the ground as a result of the attacks. Bataan Field, along with airfields at Cabcaben and Mariveles were kept in operation for several months during the Battle of Bataan. The remaining pilots continued operations with the few planes that were left, cannibalizing aircraft wreckage to keep a few planes airborne in the early months of 1942.

=== After Bataan ===
With the surrender of the United States Army on Bataan, Philippines on 8 April 1942, the remaining air echelon of the 24th Pursuit Group withdrew to Mindanao Island and began operating from Del Monte Airfield with whatever aircraft were remaining. The last of the group's aircraft were captured or destroyed by enemy forces on or about 1 May 1942. With the collapse of organized United States resistance in the Philippines on 8 May 1942, a few surviving members of the squadron managed to escape from Mindanao to Australia where they were integrated into existing units.

The 24th Pursuit Group and its squadrons were never remanned after the battle. They were simply left on the active list of Fifth Air Force organizations throughout the war. The unit and its subordinate squadrons were inactivated on 2 April 1946. Over the years, the 3d, 17th, 20th and 21st Squadrons were re-activated by the United States Air Force and currently are on active duty, but the 34th Squadron has remained inactive.

== Lineage ==
- Constituted as the 24th Pursuit Group (Interceptor) on 16 August 1941

Activated on 1 October 1941
Inactivated on 2 April 1946

- Redesignated 324th Tactical Fighter Wing on 31 January 1985 (not active)

=== Assignments ===
- Philippine Department Air Force (later Far East Air Force, 5th Air Force, Fifth Air Force, 16 August 1941 – 2 April 1946

=== Stations and components ===
- Headquarters and Ground Echelon:

Clark Field, Luzon, 1 October 1941
Mariveles, Bataan, Luzon, c. 1 January – May 1942

- 3d Pursuit Squadron: 1 October 1941 – 2 April 1946

Squadron operated from: Iba Airfield, Luzon, 1 September 1941
Squadron operated from: Nichols Field, Luzon, 9 December 1941
Squadron operated from: Ternate Field, Luzon, 12 December 1941
Squadron operated from: Del Carmen Field**, Luzon, 25 December 1941

- 17th Pursuit Squadron: 1 October 1941 – 2 April 1946

Squadron operated from: Nichols Field, Luzon, 5 December 1941
Squadron operated from: Clark Field, Luzon, 9–25 December 1941
Squadron operated from: Pilar Airfield**, Luzon, 26 December 1941 – 8 January 1942

- 20th Pursuit Squadron: 1 October 1941 – 2 April 1946

Squadron operated from: Clark Field**, Luzon, 1 October 1941

- 21st Pursuit Squadron: 1 October 1941 – 2 April 1946 (Attached. Deployed from 35th Pursuit Group, Hamilton AAF, California)

Squadron operated from: Nichols Field, Luzon, 1 November 1941
Squadron operated from: Lubao Airfield**, Luzon, 26 December 1941 – 2 January 1942

- 34th Pursuit Squadron: 1 October 1941 – 2 April 1946 (Attached. Deployed from 35th Pursuit Group, Hamilton AAF, California)

Squadron operated from: Del Carmen Field, Luzon, 1 November – 25 December 1941
Squadron operated from: Orani Airfield**, Luzon, 26 December 1941 – 4 January 1942

.** Far East Air Force units were ordered moved to Bataan Airfield, along with airfields at Cabcaben and Mariveles, effective 8 January 1942 – c. 8 April 1942 After the fall of Bataan, some aircraft and personnel managed to escape to Mindanao, and operate from Del Monte Airfield, c. 8 April – c. 1 May 1942

.** Unneeded Ground Echelon personnel were assigned to the 5th Interceptor Command and fought as a ground infantry unit during the Battle of Bataan 18 January – 8 April 1942

=== Aircraft ===
- Seversky P-35A, 1941–1942

Assigned to the 34th Pursuit Squadron

- Curtiss P-40B, 1941-1942

Assigned to the 20th Pursuit Squadron

- Curtiss P-40E, 1941-1942

Assigned to the 3d, 17th and 21st Pursuit Squadrons

Note: 52 P-35As were shipped to the Philippines during 1941. Most ex-Swedish orders and arrived in the Philippines in Swedish instruments, markings, and technical orders. There were several accidents and write-offs before the war started. These were assigned to the 4th Composite Group 3d, 17th and 20th Pursuit Squadrons. 24 were transferred to the 34th Pursuit Squadron upon its arrival at Del Carmen Field on 1 November 1941 with the rest being transferred to the Philippine Army Air Corps.

There were a total of 107 Curtiss P-40s that were assigned to the 24th Pursuit Group, most being received after the transition from the 4th Composite Group. They were a mix of P-40Bs and P-40Es, mostly Es. Also, there were several P-40E-1s that were shipped to the Philippines that were still in crates at the Manila Air Depot on 8 December 1941. It is unknown whether or not these saw service against the Japanese.
