= Del Carmen Airfield =

Former military airfield in Luzon, Philippines

Del Carmen Airfield
- Part of Fifth Air Force
- Luzon, Philippines
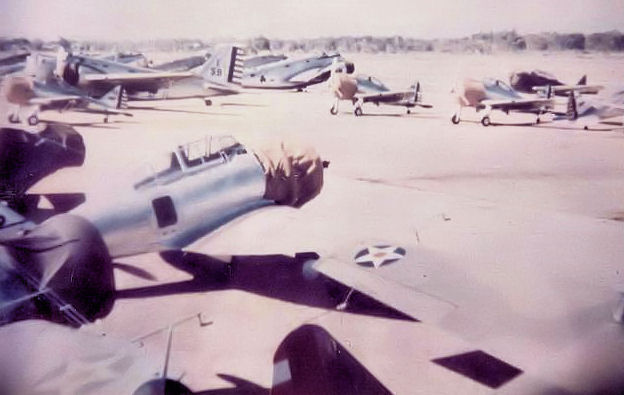
- P-35's at Del Carmen field, 1941

Site information
- Type: Military airfield
- Controlled by: United States Army Air Forces

Site history
- Built: 1930s
- In use: 1940–1941 (Occupied by the Japanese, December 1941 – January 1945)
- Battles/wars: Battle of the Philippines (1942); Philippines Campaign (1944–45)

Del Carmen Airfield is a former United States Army Air Forces airfield on Luzon in the Philippines. It was overrun by the Imperial Japanese Army during the Battle of the Philippines (1942).

== History ==
Company B, 803rd Engineer (Aviation) Battalion (Separate) began Del Carmen airfield in early November 1941. It was located to the south of Clark Field in Pampanga Province and west of Barrio Floridablanca. The airdrome was to be a sizable facility originally with three runways, each 6,780 feet long and 300 feet wide laid out in an "A" pattern—northwest-southeast (NW-SE), northeast–southwest (NE-SW), and east–west (E-W). Also on the construction list were about 100 buildings. Construction was to encompass barracks for 2,750 officers and enlisted men, both combat and support units, including one company of aviation engineers; aircraft and bomb storage warehouses; aircraft revetments, hospital and dispensary; under and above-ground storage for 750,000 gallons of gasoline, and a supporting road network. By 30 November one runway was completed and other projects were under construction. The Fifth Air Force based Seversky P-35As assigned to the 34th Pursuit Squadron, attached to the 24th Pursuit Group at the airfield prior to the Japanese air attack on the Philippines, 8 December 1941. Dust from the areas maritime and volcanic soils plagued the squadron's air operations.

On the day of the first attack by Japanese aircraft, fighters were ordered from Del Carmen to cover Clark Field but failed to arrive before the Japanese hit Clark shortly after 1200 hours. The 34th suffered a few casualties in combat, including its commander Lt. Sam Maret, but the Japanese destroyed most of the 34th's P-35As with a bombing and strafing attack on 10 December. An advance echelon of Company B departed Del Carmen Field for Orani, Bataan, on 20 December 1941, and the rear guard evacuated the field on 25 or 26 December. The 24th left shortly thereafter. After its occupation, it was used by Japanese aircraft as a satellite field for the Clark area.

After the recapture of Luzon during the Philippines Campaign (1944–45), the airfield was not used by the USAAF. It was, however, the scene of a Japanese attack on 7 December 1944 when Japanese General Tomoyuki Yamashita ordered the entire First Airborne Brigade with two regiments to jump the American beachhead on Leyte on 6 December. Japanese paratroopers loaded into 95th Sentai Ki-49 "Helens" and Ki-57 "Topsys". They took off from Angeles South Airfield and Del Carmen Airfield. For the paratrooper drop and crash landings against the American liberated San Pablo Airfield and Buri Airfield at 1800 hours. Although the paratroopers caught the Americans by surprise, those who did reach the airfields were ineffective. The attack proved to be disorganized and an abortive effort.

== See also ==
- Geography of the Philippines
- Military History of the Philippines
- Military History of the United States
- United States Army Air Forces in the South West Pacific Theatre
