= 5th Interceptor Command =

- Active: 7 November 1941 – 9 April 1942
- Country: United States
- Branch: United States Army Air Forces
- Type: Radar Defense, Infantry
- Engagements: Battle of the Philippines (1941–42)

Commanders
- Notable commanders: Brig. Gen. Henry B. Clagett; Brig. Gen. Harold H. George; Col.Lawrence S. Churchill

The 5th Interceptor Command was a temporary organization of the United States Army Air Forces. It was wiped out in the Battle of the Philippines (1941–42). The survivors fought as infantry during Battle of Bataan and after their surrender, were subjected to the Bataan Death March, although some did escape to Australia.

== History ==
Established in November 1941 to provide air defense of Luzon, Philippine Islands. After Japanese invasion on 24 December 1941, mission changed to provide ground defense of island, with ground and air echelon personnel of unequipped Fifth Air Force units on Luzon attached to fight as ground infantry units during the Battle of the Philippines (1941–42) after their aircraft were destroyed or evacuated to locations away from Luzon.

Most members of the command surrendered on 9 April 1942 after the Battle of Bataan. Some survivors escaped to Corregidor Island in Manila Bay, Philippine Islands and surrendered on 6 May 1942, ending all US organized resistance to the Japanese in the Philippines. Some survivors possibly fought afterwards on Luzon as unorganized resistance (May 1942 – January 1945).

=== Lineage ===
- Established as 5th Interceptor Command (Provisional) 7 November 1941 (date approximate)

Discontinued c. May 1942 (date approximate)

=== Assignments ===
- Far East Air Force (later 5th Air Force) (attached to U.S. Army Forces Far East after 25 December 1941)

=== Station ===
- Nielson Field, Luzon, Philippines
- Bataan, Luzon, Philippines 25 December 1941 – 9 April 1942

=== Components ===
- Air and Ground echelons of the following:

24th Pursuit Group (Interceptor)*
2d Observation Squadron (Medium)*
3d Pursuit Squadron (Interceptor)*
17th Pursuit Squadron (Interceptor)*
20th Pursuit Squadron (Interceptor)*
21st Pursuit Squadron (Interceptor)*
34th Pursuit Squadron (Interceptor)*

- Ground Echelons

V Bomber Command
19th Bombardment Group (Heavy)
27th Bombardment Group (Light)
14th Bombardment Squadron: ground echelon attached c. 24 December 1941 – May 1942
16th Bombardment Squadron (Light)
17th Bombardment Squadron (Light)
28th Bombardment Squadron: ground echelon attached c. 24 December 1941 – May 1942
30th Bombardment Squadron: ground echelon attached c. 20 December 1941 – May 1942
91st Bombardment Squadron (Light)
93d Bombardment Squadron: ground echelon attached c. 19 December 1941 – May 1942

Notes: All units in attached status. *Unit not manned or equipped, carried as active unit (non-operational) 9 April 1942 – 2 April 1946.
