= Bataan Airfield =

Former military airfield in Luzon, Philippines

- Part of Far East Air Force
- Luzon, Philippines
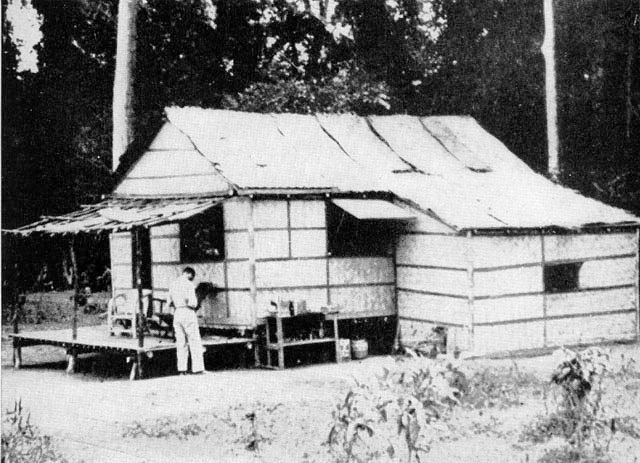
- A shelter near Bataan Field, 1942

Site information
- Type: Military Airfield
- Controlled by: United States Army Air Forces

Location
- Coordinates: 14°27′14.81″N 120°34′06.63″E (Approximate)

Site history
- Built: 1941
- In use: 1941–1942
- Battles/wars: Battle of the Philippines (1942)

Bataan Airfield was a former wartime United States Army Air Forces airfield on Luzon in the Philippines. It was overrun by the Imperial Japanese Army during the Battle of the Philippines (1942). The airfield was located near the village of Lucanin, south Lamao in Bataan Province.

== History ==
The airfield was the most expansive of three surviving airfields on Bataan after the withdrawal of US Forces in the Far East (USAFFE) to a reserve battle position (RBP). It was located near the Juanting River several miles from the southern tip of the Bataan peninsula. Construction on the field probably began in September, 1941. By the start of the war Bataan Field consisted of one runway (NW-SE), hacked out of the jungle by Army engineers. Elements of Company C, 803rd Engineers (Aviation) (Separate) arrived at the field on Christmas Day, 1941, to continue expanding and repairing the runway and, in conjunction with personnel of the Far East Air Force (FEAF), building revetments for aircraft. The field was well camouflaged. FEAF lost no aircraft as a result of numerous Japanese bombing and strafing raids.

Sources: Memo [Col.] H[enry] H. S[tickney] to G-4, [Philippine Department], October 14, 1941, Subject: Weekly Report of Department Engineers Construction, Casey Files; Office of the Department Engineer (ODE), Construction Progress Report for Semi-Monthly Period Ending November 15, 1941; CMSGT Clarence Kinser, Interviews, March 26 and May 4, 1999; Letter, Blair Robinette to William Bartsch, February 24, 1983; Statement (draft), Maj. Gen. Hugh J. Casey, n.d., Subject: Airdrome Construction in the Philippines, [October 8, 1941 – May 6, 1942] p. 5, Casey Files, Folder 1; Fertig, Guerrillero, p. 73; William Bartsch, Doomed from the Start, p. 222, 257.

=== Retreat to Bataan ===
On 24 December orders were received by the 24th Pursuit Group, then at Clark Field, to evacuate the group to the Bataan Peninsula of Luzon. Between the 24th and 10 January 1942 this evacuation was accomplished. Headquarters was moved from Clark Field first to Balanga, and from there to the Mariveles River on the Mariveles cut-off. There a command post for the 24th was established.

The remaining aircraft of the 24th, 18 P-40Es and P-40B Warhawks were at Lubano and Orani Fields. As the front lines fell back to the Bataan Peninsula, these aircraft were moved back and concentrated at Bataan Field. There, the planes were maintained by enlisted men and flown by pilots selected from the entire Group, as the squadrons were folded into one unit.

=== Operations ===
Initial operations of the 24th from Bataan Field consisted of an interception mission against a Japanese bomb attack on Corregidor on 4 January. After the interception, in which no enemy planes were shot down, a flight of 9 P-40s were sent south to Del Monte Field on Mindanao. Two planes were lost en route. By 26 January, attrition had reduced the force of P-40s at Bataan to seven, and the planes were loaded with fragmentation bombs for an attack on the occupied Nichols and Nielson Fields near Manila. One plane crashed on takeoff, the others carried out strafing and bombardment of Japanese planes on the line at the captured airfields. Intelligence reported that the raid was successful, with at least 37 Japanese aircraft destroyed on the ground, along with gasoline and oil drums set on fire. Over 300 casualties were inflicted. The raiders returned to Cabacaban Airfield and were reloaded, rearmed and departed for a second attack, however they had to turn back due to the dense smoke which was rising from both airfields due to the fires.

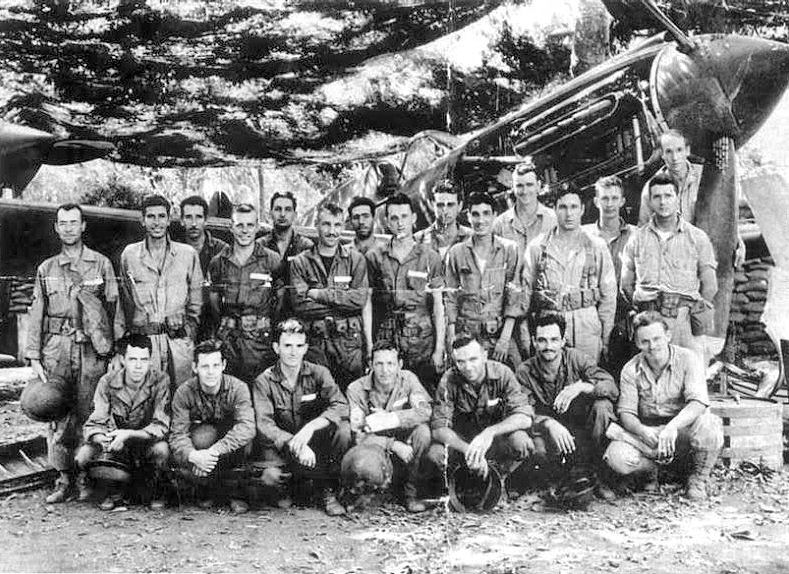
24th Pursuit Group Curtiss P-40E Warhawk at Bataan Airfield, 1942

During the month of January, reconnaissance flights were flown as far north as Lingayen Gulf were performed by one or two or sometimes three P-40s. By the end of the month all surviving planes were in poor condition, but still able to fly.

On 1 February, four P-40s attacked a Japanese landing party at Agaloma Point which had overrun beach defense forces. A combination of American naval action and the P-40s carrying out a staffing attack, prevented their reinforcement by barges. On the morning of 5 February, American troops, reinforced with tanks, were able to destroy the landing party. On the 9th, a photographic reconnaissance was made with six P-40s over the captured Cavite Naval Base. On the return leg to Bataan, the flight was jumped by six Zeros. All of the Zeros were destroyed, with one of the P-40s lost. It is unlikely Navy Zeroes were employed in this attack. More likely, they were Army Nakijima Ki-27 Nates.

On 2 March an attack was carried out against Japanese shipping in Subic Bay. Four P-40s each with one 500 pound bomb attacked a concentration of ships about 13:00. After attacking the ships, the planes proceed to attack ground installations at the captured Subic Bay Naval Base, causing damage and destruction of supplies. Several ships were seen to be sinking. Attacks were continued until darkness. One P-40 was lost and three crash landed on their way back to Bataan Field. Enemy losses were estimated at 44,000 tons of shipping, plus gasoline supplies and other equipment.

From 1 February though 7 April, the 24th was also engaged in ferrying medical supplies up from Del Monte Field to Bataan, and personnel and records on the return flight to Del Monte. These flights were made by an obsolete Navy plane which had been acquired by the Group, Two civilian Beechcraft and one Waco were also used, which had been commandeered from civilians in Cebu and Iloilo.

Information was received at Bataan Field that some B-17s would be flown up from Australia to Del Monte Field on 27 March to break the Japanese blockade encircling the Bataan Peninsula. The four P-40s of the group and a Philippines Air Corps Seversky P-35 would be joined by the four squadron P-40s that were still on Mindanao, and another three P-40s which had been shipped up from Australia. On 5 April the final arrangements for reconnaissance and fighter protection for the bombers was completed.

However, on 7 April the Japanese broke the 2d Corps Front and a general retreat was ordered from Bataan to Corregidor. This necessitated the 24th to pull out of Bataan Field and reorganize at Del Monte Field. The last four P-40s of the Group left Bataan on 8 April heading south. Bataan Field was captured as part of the American surrender on 9 April 1942.

=== Final operations ===
On 10 April the planned bombardment mission against Japanese forces on Bataan was carried out, concentrating on Legazpi, Cebu, Iloilo and Davao. During this time, the fighters performed reconnaissance throughout the area and made a staffing attack on Davao, destroying several enemy aircraft on the ground and two in the air. American losses were one B-17 and one P-40. Japanese losses were one light cruiser, several transports and damage to their ground installations at Davao. After the raid the B-17s returned to Darwin, Australia.

The remaining planes of the 24th Pursuit Group flew reconnaissance for the Commanding General, Mindanao forces until the end of the month until 1 May when the Japanese landed at three points on Mindanao and enveloped the American forces.

== See also ==
- Geography of the Philippines
- Military history of the Philippines
- Military history of the United States
- United States Army Air Forces in the South West Pacific Theatre
