= Del Monte Airfield =

U.S. Air Force airfield in Mindanao, Philippines (1941–1942)

- Part of Far East Air Force
- Mindanao, Philippines
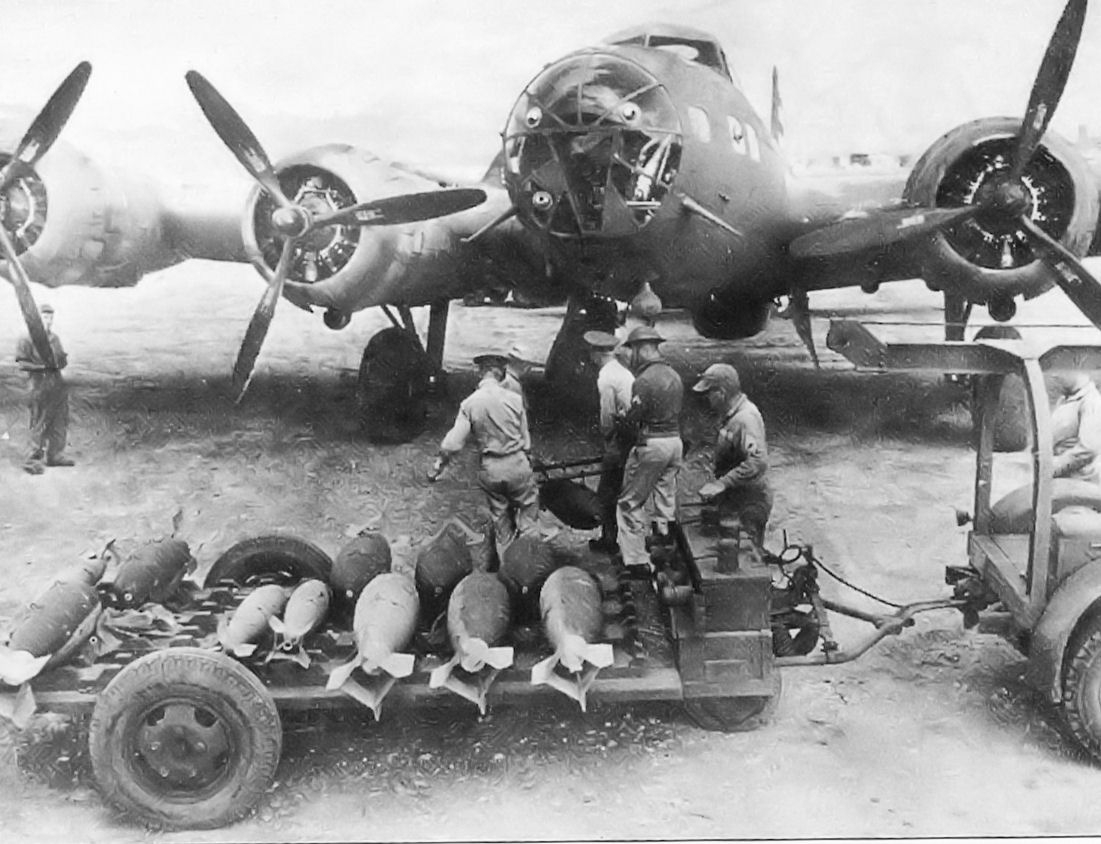
- A B-17D of the 30th Bombardment Squadron being loaded with 100 and 500-pound bombs probably at Del Monte Field, Mindanao, Philippines, early in 1942. Note the Fortress is parked in a rough, dirt area and the early M1917 Helmet and pre-war uniform worn by one of the ground crew, indicating the photo was taken in a combat area in the first few weeks of the war.

Site information
- Type: Military airfield
- Controlled by: United States Army Air Forces
- Condition: Abandoned

Location
- Location within Philippines
- Coordinates: 08°21′42″N 124°50′00″E (Approximate)

Site history
- Built: 1941
- In use: September 1941 – March 1942
- Battles/wars: World War II (Asia-Pacific Theater)
- Events: Battle of the Philippines (1941–1942)

Garrison information
- Garrison: Elements of Far East Air Force

Del Monte Field (active 1941–1942) was a heavy bomber airfield of the Far East Air Force (FEAF) of the United States Army Air Forces, located in Mindanao in the Philippines. The airfield was located in a meadow of a Del Monte Corporation pineapple plantation.

== Overview ==
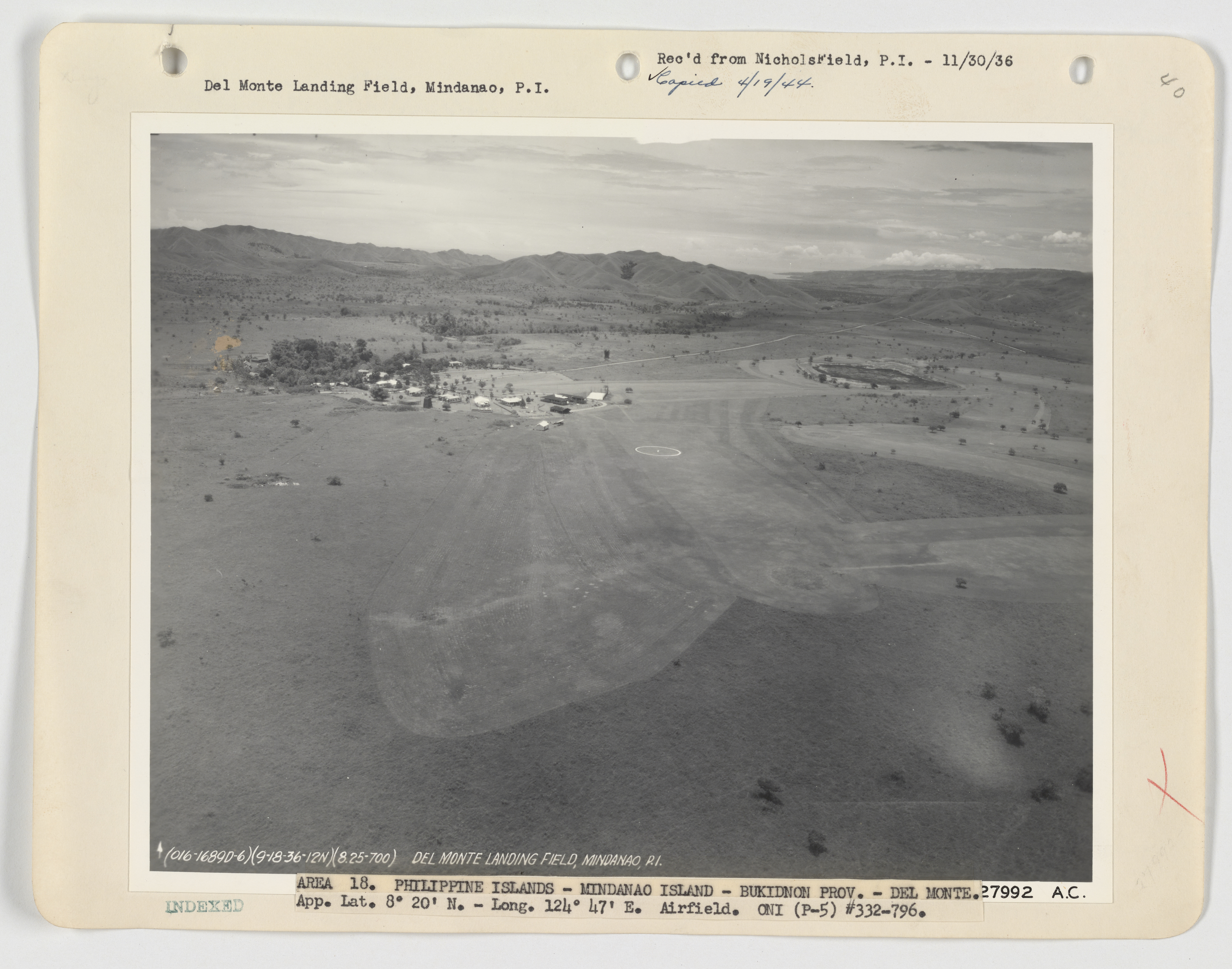
Aerial view NNW of the landing field on the Del Monte Golf Course, 1936, identifiable by the road and large pond.

Del Monte Airfield was first selected in September 1941 as an emergency landing strip on Mindanao, capable of landing four-engine B-17 Flying Fortress heavy bombers during the May to October wet season. It was built on a natural meadow on the Del Monte Pineapple Corporation plantation along the Sayre Highway, in the municipality of Maluko (now Manolo Fortich) of Bukidnon Province in northern Mindanao. The población of the rural municipality was nearby. The airfield was established as part of the build-up of United States military forces in the Philippines due to the rising tensions with the Empire of Japan.

== History ==
=== November 1941 ===
In mid-November 1941, with the creation of the FEAF, General Douglas MacArthur approved the expansion of Del Monte into a heavy bomber base for the 7th Bombardment Group, projected to arrive in early December. His plans, MacArthur told the Chief of Staff on 29 November, called ultimately for more bomber bases in the Visayas to accommodate three additional groups, but since funds for construction of runways for such bases could not be immediately allocated, he agreed to use the field at Del Monte.

On 21 November Col. Harold H. George, acting in place of FEAF commander Maj. Gen. Lewis H. Brereton while he was in Australia trying to arrange support bases for his air force, sent the newly arrived 5th Air Base Group to Del Monte in two inter-island steamers to hurry construction. Work on the field was rushed and by 5 December it was able to accommodate heavy bombers.

Two runways were built: No. 1 (main runway) and No. 2 (pursuit). A golf course was used as a third auxiliary strip. Additional dispersal airstrips were built over the next few months at Dalirig near Del Monte, Malaybalay, Maramag, and Valencia.

On the morning of 4 December, after the only operational FEAF radar site detected Japanese weather reconnaissance flights on several successive nights, MacArthur's headquarters ordered the 19th BG to be moved out of range of direct attack. However Brereton decided to send only half of the 35 B-17s at Clark Field to Del Monte because the latter could accommodate only six squadrons and the 7th BG was expected to arrive soon.

Orders were issued on 5 December to move the 16 B-17s of the 14th and 93d Bombardment Squadrons from Clark to Del Monte. Since there were no barracks built at Del Monte yet, and intending to remain only 72 hours, the bombers were filled with tents, cots, blankets and rations. The men also took only what they needed, some toiletries and a few changes of uniform. The aircraft flew down singly on the night of 5–6 December, circling at the end of their 4-hour flight before being permitted to land at dawn (5 December in the United States) at Del Monte No. 1, just completed the day before. Materiel to support the arrival of the 7th BG was not scheduled to leave Luzon until 10 December.

=== Battle of the Philippines ===
On 8 December, the initial Japanese attack on Clark Field caught most of the remainder of the 19th Bombardment Group on the ground. The bomber and fighter sweeps on the field destroyed most of the aircraft. In the ensuing Battle of the Philippines (1942) and after the destruction of Clark and Nichols Fields on Luzon in the first days of the war, the Japanese flew extensive reconnaissance missions to discover the remaining American aircraft in the Philippines. They had been unable to find the Del Monte field, but it was only a question of time before this last haven would be discovered and destroyed as were the airfields on Luzon. Moreover, it was becoming increasingly difficult to service the B-17s with the inadequate facilities at Del Monte. There were no spare parts, engines, or propellers for the B-17s in the Philippines; damaged B-17s had to be cannibalized to keep the bombers flying. The only tools were those in the possession of the crews. The men who worked on the planes all night often got no rest the next day because of air alerts. On some days the heavy bombers had to remain aloft during the daylight hours to avoid destruction on the ground. They dodged back and forth between Mindanao and Luzon, playing a game of hide-and-seek that wore out men as well as planes.

B-17s flying from Del Monte Airfield became the first United States aircraft to engage in offensive action against the Japanese. On December 14, 1941, the American Army Air Forces reacted to the Japanese invasion of the Philippines at Legaspi, Luzon by sending 3 of a group of 6 Del Monte-based B-17s, ordered to attack the landing force. They attacked a Japanese minesweeper and a transport, thought to be a destroyer, with meager results, and 9 naval aircraft based on the Legaspi strip. The unescorted bombers were no match for the Japanese fighters and soon beat a hasty retreat. Only one of the B-17s was able to make its way back to Del Monte; the others had to crash-land short of their base. The Japanese lost at most 4 fighters.

Under these conditions, it was evident that the remaining heavy bombers could not operate efficiently in the Philippines. General Brereton therefore requested authority on December 15 to move the B-17s to Darwin in northwest Australia, 1,500 miles away, where they could be based safely and serviced properly. His intention was to operate from fields near Darwin, using Del Monte as an advance base from which to strike enemy targets in the Philippines. The planes were immediately prepared for the long flight southward, and on December 15 the first group of B-17s left Del Monte airfield. By the following evening ten of the bombers had reached Batchelor Field outside Darwin. They had left Mindanao none too soon, as the complex of airfields was discovered by the Japanese on December 18, 1941 and attacked the following day by Japanese planes based on the carrier Ryujo.

On December 22, 1941, 9 B-17's from Batchelor Field near Darwin, Northern Territory, Australia, attacked shipping in Davao Bay, Mindanao Island and landed at Del Monte. The next day 4 B-17s took off from Del Monte after midnight and bombed enemy shipping in Lingayen Gulf. On the 24th, 3 B-17's based at Del Monte bombed the airfield and shipping at Davao on the southeast coast of Mindanao before flying to Australia.

On March 16, 1942, Del Monte was later used to evacuate General MacArthur, his family, and senior staff from the Philippines, leaving before midnight. The evacuation party had arrived by PT boat from Corregidor and on March 16, four B-17 Flying Fortresses from Australia flew up to Del Monte: B-17E 41-2408, B-17E 41-2429, B-17E 41-2434 and B-17E 41-2447 and evacuated them to Batchelor Field, arriving on the 17th.

On Thursday, March 26, 1942, Del Monte was again used to evacuate Philippine President, Manuel Quezon, his family, doctors, chaplain, and senior staff. Two B-17's had flown up from Australia and arrived at 8:45pm and departed again at 11pm for Australia.

On April 8, 1942, the air echelons of the 24th Pursuit Group along with the remaining Army Air Corps flying operations in the Philippines were withdrawn from Luzon and transferred to Del Monte with whatever aircraft were left to carry on the fight.

In April 1942, a group of 7 B-25s and 3 B-17s from Australia returned to Del Monte for the Royce Mission, to attack the Japanese on three bombing missions. On April 12, B-25s hit the harbor and shipping at Cebu, Cebu Island while B-17s carried out single-bomber strikes against Cebu harbor and Nichols Field on Luzon. On 13 April B-25s hit targets in the Philippines for the second consecutive day. The B-25s took off just after midnight and bombed shipping at Cebu and installations at Davao on Mindanao. Later in the day the B-25s again attacked Davao, bombing the dock area.

The advancing Japanese forced their return to Australia. In addition to the raids, they brought out a number of important military and diplomatic personnel who had gathered at Del Monte to await evacuation. The last of the 24th Pursuit Group's aircraft were captured or destroyed by enemy forces on or about May 1, 1942 when the airfield was abandoned by the United States, leaving its facilities to the Japanese invaders.

== Del Monte Airfield today ==
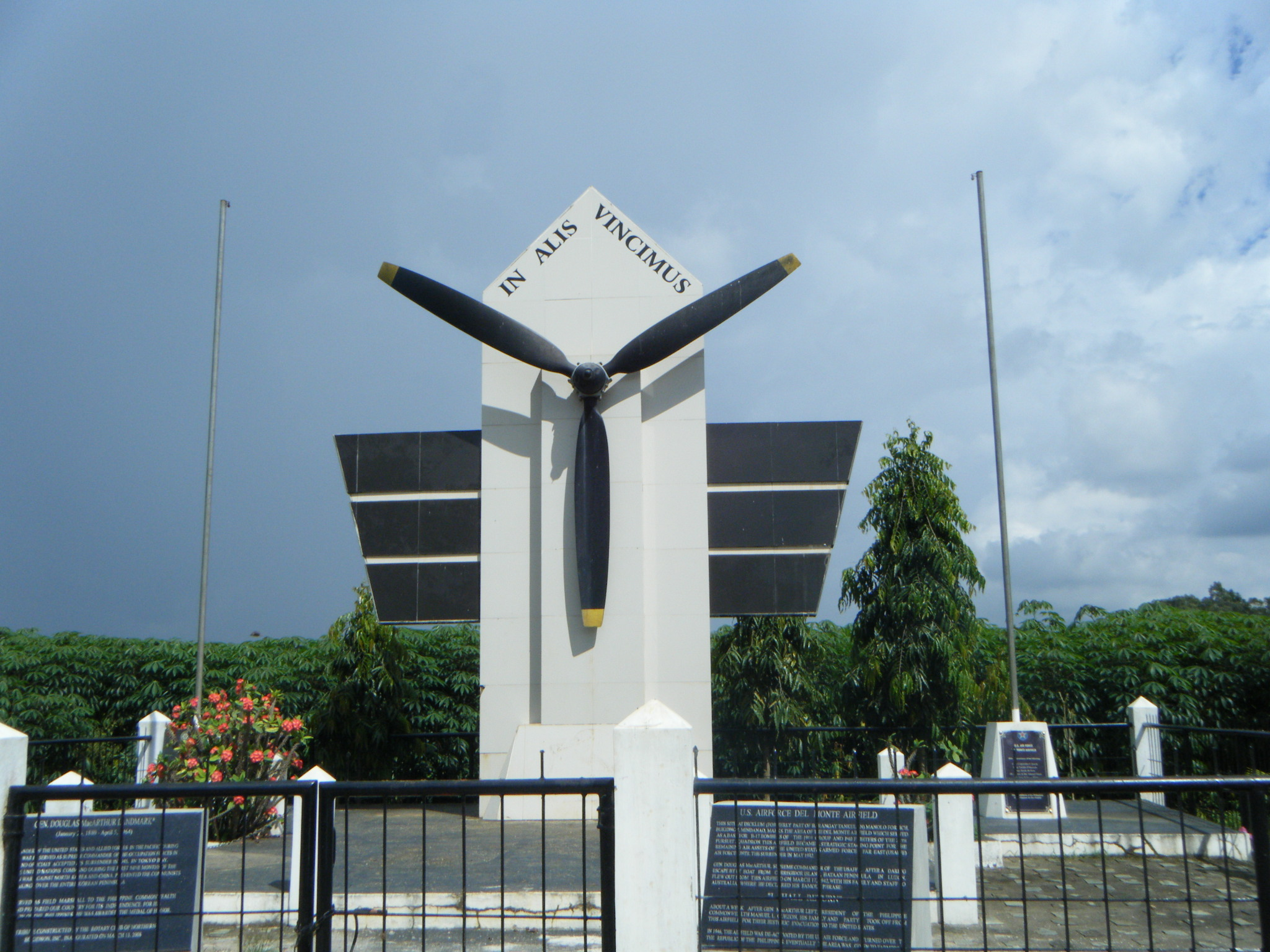
Gen. Douglas MacArthur evacuation memorial in Diklum, Bukidnon in Mindanao, bearing the inscription In alis vincimus (On wings we conquer)

The complex was not used by the United States or Philippine Commonwealth armed forces during the Philippines Campaign (1944–45), and the airfields were returned to the Del Monte Pineapple Corporation.

MacArthur evacuation memorial at the site of the Del Monte Field, Manolo Fortich, Bukidnon, Philippines,

The present-day airstrip of the Del Monte company, built for their light aircraft, is about two miles south of the wartime airfield. Both #1 (Main) and #2 (Fighter) fields have become rice paddies and cornfields, a dirt road being the only trace of their wartime purpose. As of October 2013, The Del Monte Airfield is closed to general aviation, but ultralight aircraft, paramotor aircraft from paramotor flying school of Kampo Juan eco resort, and radio-controlled aircraft enthusiasts from nearby Cagayan de Oro city use the airfield with the approval of the Del Monte management.

The Gen. Douglas MacArthur Landmark was erected by the Rotary Club of Northern Bukidnon in Barangay Dicklum to mark the site of Del Monte Field.

== See also ==
- United States Army Air Forces in the South West Pacific Theatre
