= Ralph Ambrose O'Neill =

American flying ace

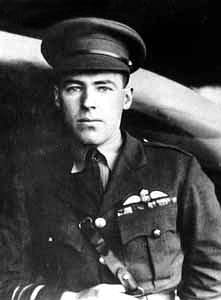
- Ralph Ambrose O'Neill.
- Born: December 7, 1896; Durango, Durango, Mexico
- Died: October 23, 1980 (aged 83); Redwood City, California
- Military career
- Allegiance: United States; Mexico
- Branch: United States Army Air Service; Mexican Air Force
- Service years: 1917 – 1919 (USA); 1920 – 1925 (Mexico)
- Rank: USA: Colonel (United States); Mexico: Brigadier General
- Nicknames: Rodolfo O'Neill (Mexico); The Snake (France)
- Unit: 147th Aero Squadron
- Conflicts: World War I Adolfo de la Huerta's rebellion (Mexico).
- Awards: Distinguished Service Cross with two Oak Leaf Clusters, Distinguished Flying Cross (United States), and French Croix de Guerre.

Ralph Ambrose O'Neill (December 7, 1896 – October 23, 1980) was a Mexican flying ace from World War I credited with 103 combat patrols and five aerial victories. He was the first "Chief" Commander of the modern Mexican Air Force. He was also a pioneer of commercial aviation.

== Biography ==
Rafael Ambrose O'Neill was born in Durango, Durango, Mexico on 17 December 1896 to father Ralph Lawrence O'Neill, an Irish Catholic candidate for Senator in Arizona; and to a Mexican mother, Dolores (Avila) O'Neill, of Castilian lineage. He was raised in the United States and began a career in the mining industry where his father operated the newspaper for the border town of Nogales, Arizona. O'Neill entered the United States Air Service in August 1917. In March 1918, he was assigned to the 147th Aero Squadron, flying the Nieuport 28 and the SPAD S.XIII. From 2 July to 31 October 1918, teaming with such squadron mates as Kenneth Porter, James Meissner, Francis Simonds, and James Healy, he shot down five German airplanes. He was awarded a total of three of the army's highest honor, the Distinguished Service Cross with two Oak Leaf Clusters along with the Distinguished Flying Cross (United States) and the French Croix de Guerre with palm. O'Neill claimed to have made an additional six unconfirmed victories for a total of eleven. He was the winner of the Tilton prize for becoming one of the first five American aviation aces of World War I.

A real character amongst his squadron, O'Neill was given the nickname "The Snake" for his unorthodox flying techniques, and fierce aggression in seemingly unfavorable odds. He was amongst the first combat pilots to paint the now-infamous "Sharks Teeth" Nose art in order to strike fear into the enemy. After gaining notoriety, he was also said to go into battle sitting on a large frying pan, which subsequently saved his life from machine gunfire.

After the war, with his fluency in Spanish, O'Neill was hired to be the South American representative for Boeing and the Pratt & Whitney Aircraft Company, affording him introductions to many heads of state.

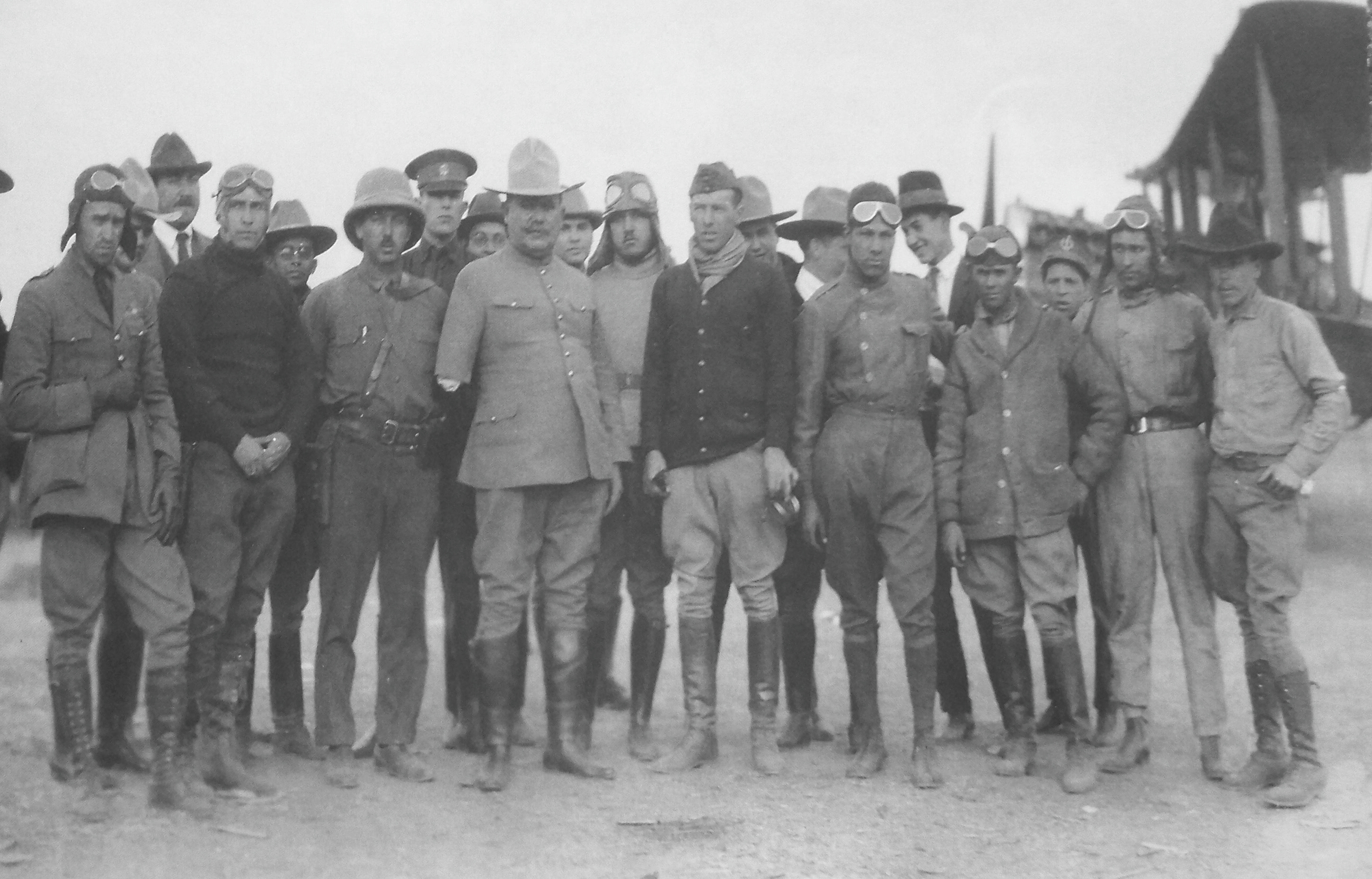
General O'Neill Standing with President Obregon

In August 1920, he signed a five-year contract to build a functional Mexican Air Force and train Mexican pilots, as Mexico was undergoing numerous violent ideological uprisings and military coups following the Plan of Agua Prieta. On September 9, he was made Chief of the Department of Aviation of the Mexican Army. In anticipation of O'Neill's arrival, French Farman F.50 twin-engine night bombers were purchased. According to the Secretary of War, in August 1920 the entire inventory consisted of only 13 aircraft. Nine were ill-equipped, mixed and matched engine, nationally-constructed biplanes. These were broadly considered still to be prototypes not suitable for concerted battle. Four more were monoplane scouts, five other planes were in repair and the rest at the TNCA were considered antiquated, wrecked, or beyond repair. The branch consisted of 27 pilots, only 4 possessing over 40 hours of flight time, and 17 of which were new cadets. With the current arsenal underwhelming and obsolete, O'Neill began to acquire air-cooled engines and new aircraft such as French Morane-Saulnier and 35 British Avro 504 model K and J for the flight school. These would later be copied and produced in Mexico under the name Avro Anáhuac.

"Jefe Rodolfo" as he was then known, would present himself to manufacturers and foreign leaders under made-up titles such as "Major-General" in order to garner prominence and legitimacy. He was the first to introduce the term "Fuerza Aérea Mexicana" (FAM) naming the organization as such. The next step was the formation of classified fighter, bomber, observation and forward reconnaissance squadrons, as well as the decentralization of Air Force units throughout the country at strategic bases. Other than the infrastructure itself, O'Neill was responsible for the invention of tactics, standard procedures and other scenario protocols never before implemented. O'Neill then set to work with his co-instructors German Fritz Bieler and Frenchman Joe Ben Lievre, using the first intercom, basically a hose and funnel to communicate in an open cockpit, known as the "Gosport System", invented by Robert Smith-Barry.

In 1923, O'Neill flew several decisive combat missions against ex-president Adolfo de la Huerta who had started an armed rebellion with sitting president Álvaro Obregón(O'Brien). The irony being that De La Huerta had been the one who hired and first equipped O'Neill; De La Huerta was soon to be the architect of his own demise. Under O'Neill's command, the Mexican Air Force achieved victory against overwhelming odds, where some 60% of the original Mexican army had been enticed to turn against the sitting government. After securing 17 new De Havilland DH-4B aircraft from America, O'Neill's patriots easily out-maneuvered the insurgents. On January 29, 1924, at Esperanza station, the tide of the war changed in favor of the loyalists thanks to better-organized ground and air co-operation along with new formations of synchronized aerial strafing runs and relentless resupply. . Many of the rebels had never encountered combat aircraft before and were left in utter dismay. During one such mission, O'Neill was able to single-handedly free a hi-jacked passenger train, as the rebels abandoned their posts. The loyalist forces eventually crushed the strongholds in Veracruz and Jalisco and De La Huerta Fled the country. O'Neill became the first to prove the resilience of air superiority on a truly grand scale. On December 19, 1924, O'Neill was promoted to the now official rank of Brigadier General, being amongst the youngest in history, at the age of 28.

A military dictatorship had clearly been averted, but this was not the end of the country's woes. Many influential political and military commanders were executed by Obregón after the failed coup. Since Obregón could not run for reelection, the power vacuum was filled by an anti-catholic regime. The new Mexican president Plutarco Elías Calles promoted the creation of the Mexican Catholic Apostolic Church, independent from Rome, which led to a civil war, known as the Cristero War killing 100,000. Soon, state control was exerted over all public broadcasts. In addition, Calles rejected the Bucareli Treaty, almost starting a war with America. In the ensuing turmoil, O'Neill left Mexico in December 1925 and returned to the United States Army Air Reserve where he was reinstated to the rank of Colonel (United States).

O'Neill is widely considered to be one of the founders of civil aviation and was one of the few to see the potential of building a vast international mail and leisure network. Most did not have confidence in the future of flight outside of war. O'Neill aimed to change the public's mind. In 1929, O'Neill created his dream company, New York, Rio, and Buenos Aires Line, which operated the first airmail route from Argentina to Miami in a Sikorsky S-38. He constructed the majority of Latin America's first landing areas, which ran up the entire Atlantic seaboard. At 8,000 miles it was the world's longest trans-continental travel service. In his autobiography, "A Dream of Eagles", O'Neill describes the birth of the flying industry and his relationship with other notable friends such as Charles Lindbergh and the first use of the Consolidated Commodore luxury travel seaplanes. The airline was to become the forerunner for both Pan American World Airways and Panair do Brasil. After a forced merger, over the right to acquisition United States government mail contracts and a heated power struggle with Juan Trippe for control of the industry, NYRBA was absorbed. This was a sore point of contention with O'Neill who felt cheated of having laid the groundwork for an entire industry. O'Neill described the entire politically motivated affair as "a shotgun wedding after a damnable rape."

His South American contacts and prowess as a diplomat allowed O'Neill to resume a career in mining exploration. In 1932, his new aerial venture, the Bol-inca Mining Corporation, opened up previously inaccessible gold deposits high in the Andes. He had combined his two lifelong passions. The company flourished for over 35 years and was such a boon to the Bolivian Government that it was forcefully expropriated and later nationalized in the 1960s.

During WWII O'Neill started a Metalcraft Company to troubleshoot issues encountered with war material in the field. After patenting various inventions and donating others to the war effort, a major breakthrough was made in the creation of an exhaust manifold for battle tanks which contributed to the victory of the Americans and British in the desert war against Rommel.

O'Neill retired to Atherton, California, where he was laid to rest in 1980.

He is a member of the OX5 Aviation Pioneers Hall of Fame and the Arizona Aviation Hall of Fame.

== Military awards ==
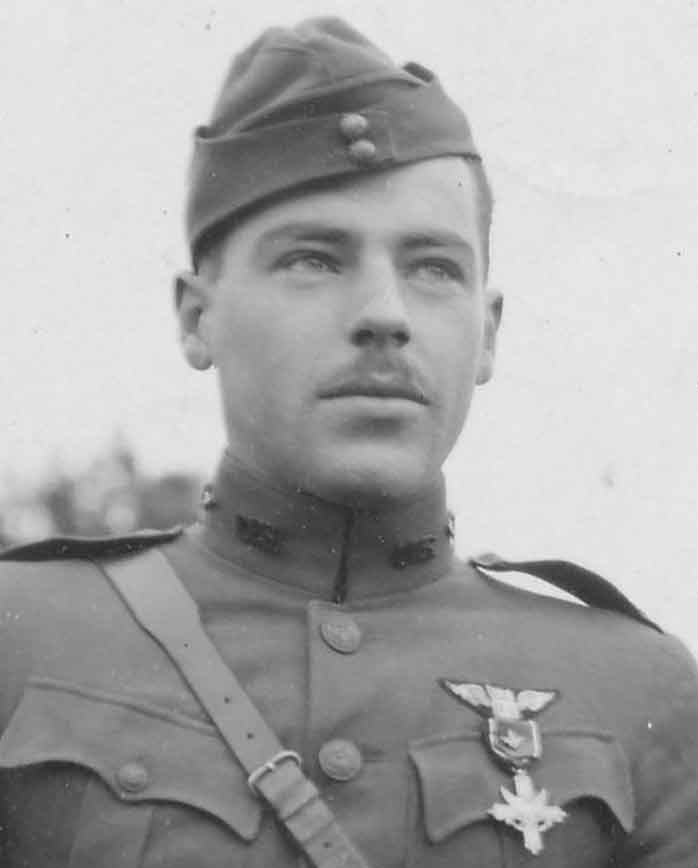
O'Neill awarded Distinguished Service Cross

- Distinguished Service Cross (DSC):

First citation:

For extraordinary heroism in action near Château Thierry, France, 2 July 1918, Lt. O'Neill and four other pilots attacked twelve enemy planes. In a battle within the enemy's lines, they brought down three German planes, one of which was credited to Lt. O'Neill.

Second citation:

The Distinguished Service Cross is presented to Ralph Ambrose O'Neill, First Lieutenant (Air Service), U.S. Army, for extraordinary heroism in action near Chateau-Thierry, France: On July 5, 1918, First Lieutenant O'Neill led three other pilots in battle against eight German pursuit planes near Chateau-Thierry. He attacked the leader, opening fire at about 150 yards, and closing up to 30 yards range. After a quick and decisive fight the enemy aircraft fell in flames. He then turned on three other machines that were attacking him from the rear and brought one of them down. The other five enemy planes were driven away.

Third citation:

The Distinguished Service Cross is presented to Ralph Ambrose O'Neill, First Lieutenant (Air Service), U.S. Army, for extraordinary heroism in action near Fresnes, France, July 24, 1918: Lieutenant O'Neill, with four other pilots, engaged 12 enemy planes discovered hiding in the sun. Leading the way to an advantageous position by a series of bold and skillful maneuvers. Lieutenant O'Neill shot down the leader of the hostile formation. The other German planes then closed in on him, but he climbed to a position of vantage above them and returned to the fight and drove down another plane. In this encounter he not only defeated his opponents in spite of overwhelming odds against him, but also enabled the reconnaissance plane to carry on its work unmolested.

- Croix de Guerre

Fierce combat pilot with unfailing courage. On July 5, 1918, he destroyed two enemy planes. On July 2, he attacked with his patrol a formation of twelve enemy battle planes and officially shot one down. On July 24, he shot down a new adversary and put to flight a second after fierce combat.

== Confirmed Victories ==
Date	Aircraft	Opposing aircraft	Location	Credit shared with
2 July 1918	Nieuport 28	Pfalz D.III	Château-Thierry	Lt TC Bronson, Lt CW McDermott, Lt MO Parry, Lt Kenneth Porter, Lt JH Stevens
5 July 1918	Nieuport 28	Pfalz D.III	Château-Thierry	Lt Francis Simonds
24 July 1918	Nieuport 28	Fokker D.VII	Bois de Eere	Lt TJ Abernathy, Lt James Healy, Lt AH Jones, Lt CP Porter
24 July 1918	Nieuport 28	Fokker D.VII	Bois de Eere	Lt TJ Abernathy, Lt James Healy, Lt AH Jones, Lt CP Porter
10 October 1918	SPAD XIII (S4625)	Rumpler C	Bantheville	Lt James Meissner, Lt GC Waters

== See also ==
- List of World War I flying aces from the United States
- Mexican Air Force
- Pan Am
- New York, Rio, and Buenos Aires Line

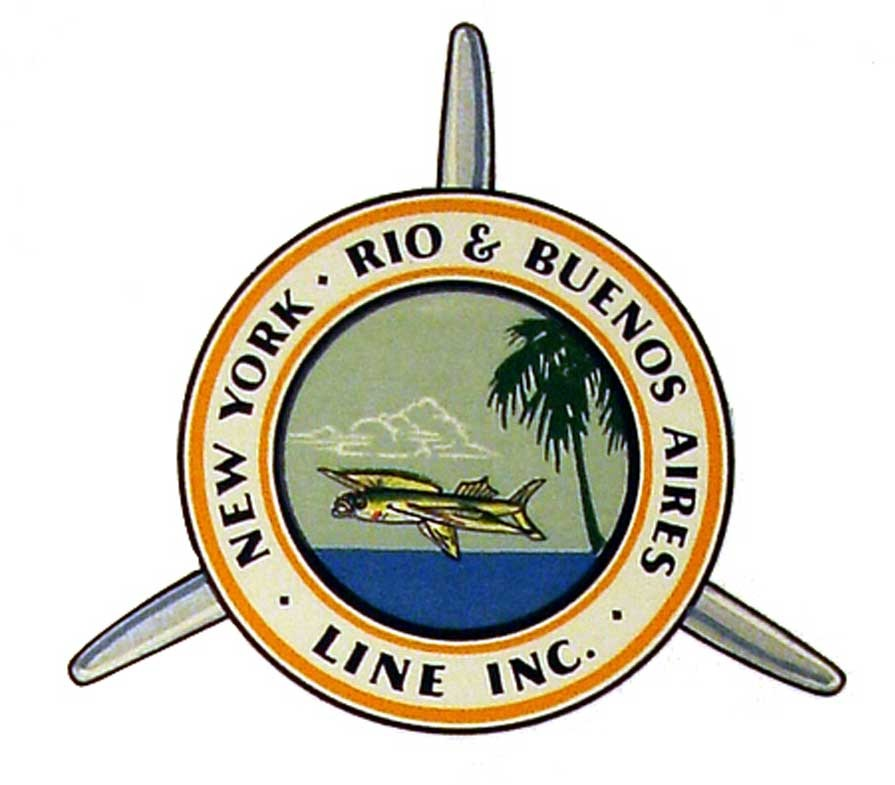
NYRBA logo

== Bibliography ==
- American Aces of World War I. Norman Franks, Harry Dempsey. Osprey Publishing, 2001. ISBN 1-84176-375-6, ISBN 978-1-84176-375-0.
- The 147th Aero Squadron in World War I: A Training and Combat History of the 'Who Said Rats' Squadron. Jack Stokes Ballard, James John Parks. Schiffer Publishing, 2013. ISBN 978-0-7643-4400-8.
- Flores, Santiago (February 13, 06). Ralph O'Neill in Mexico . Air & Space Power Journal . Archived from the original on January 7, 2010 . Retrieved November 17, 2008 .
- A Dream of Eagles. Ralph A. O'Neill, Joseph F Hood, Houghton Mifflin. 1973. ISBN 978-0395166109.
