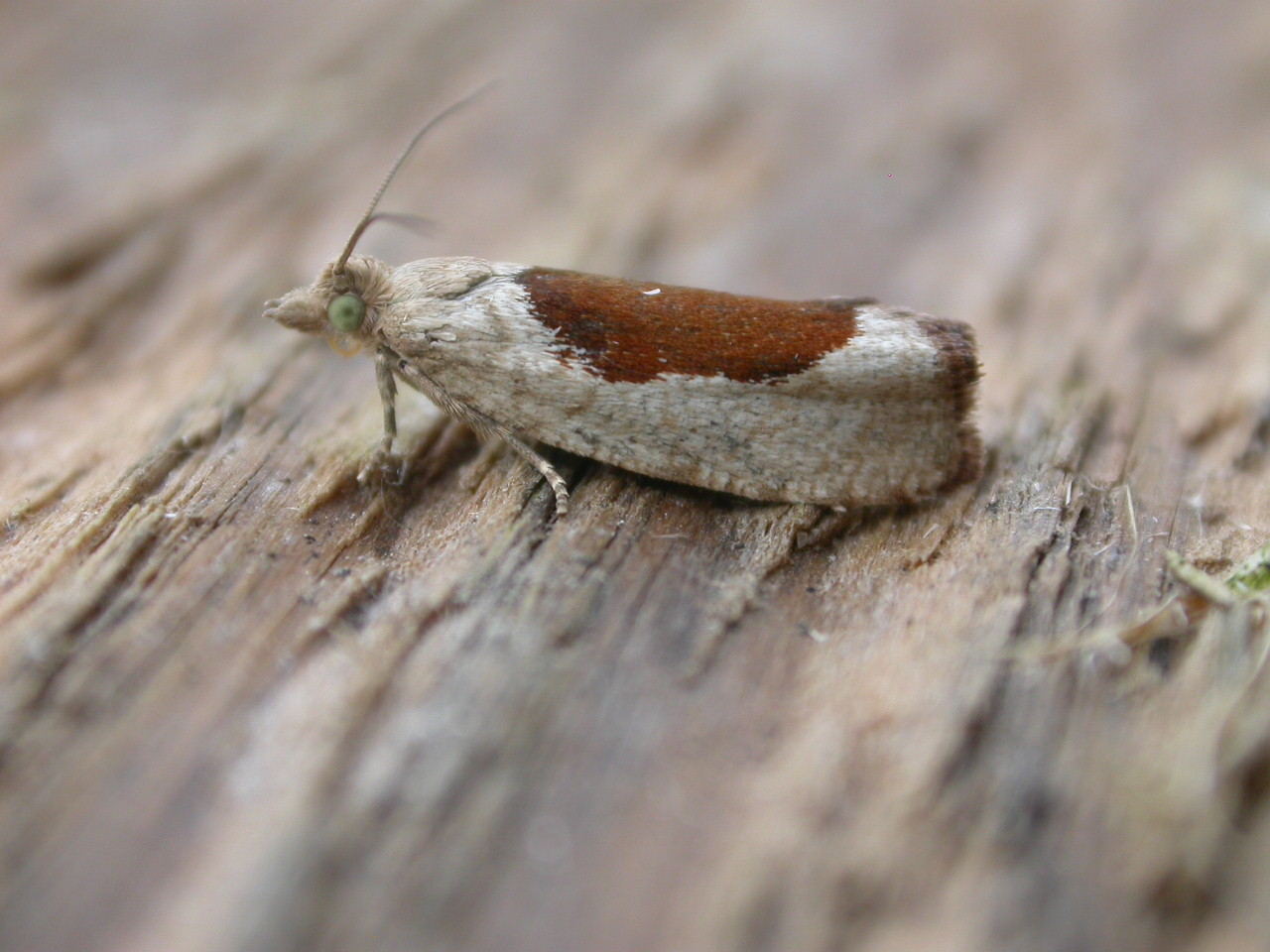
- Touquin, Seine-et-Marne, N France
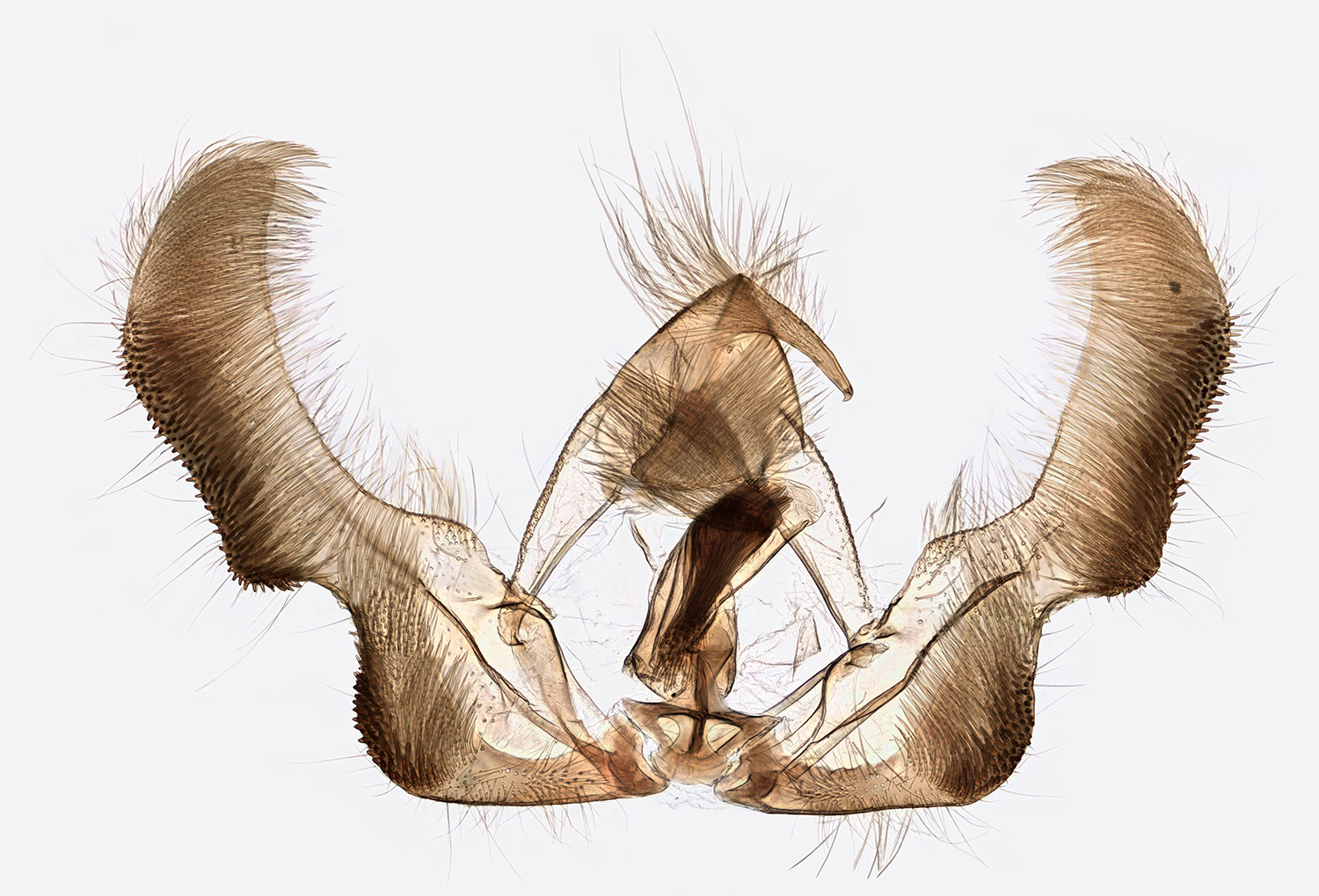
- Epinotia solandriana Anglesey, North Wales male genitalia

Scientific classification
- Kingdom: Animalia
- Phylum: Arthropoda
- Clade: Pancrustacea
- Class: Insecta
- Order: Lepidoptera
- Family: Tortricidae
- Genus: Epinotia
- Species: E. solandriana

Binomial name
- Epinotia solandriana (Linnaeus, 1758)

Synonyms
- List: Phalaena (Tortrix) solandriana Linnaeus, 1758; Epiblema solandriana f. albosinuana Grabe, 1944; Eucosma solandriana f. centrostriana Sheldon, 1935; Epiblema solandriana f. fuscosolandriana Grabe, 1944; Epiblema solandriana f. fuscotrapezana Grabe, 1944; Eucosma solandriana f. griseana Sheldon, 1935; Epiblema solandriana f. ochreotrapezana Grabe, 1944; Tortrix parmatana Hubner, [1814-1817]; Tortrix ratana Hubner, [1811-1813]; Tortrix rattana Frolich, 1828; Tortrix rhenana Thunberg & Becklin, 1791; Eucosma solandriana f. rufana Sheldon, 1935; Epiblema solandriana f. rufosinuana Grabe, 1944; Tortrix semilunana Frolich, 1828; Phalaena (Tortrix) semimaculana Hubner, 1793; Pyralis trapezana Fabricius, 1787; Eucosma solandriana f. variegata Sheldon, 1935; Eucosma solandriana f. variegatastriana Sheldon, 1935

= Epinotia solandriana =

Species of moth

Epinotia solandriana is a moth of the family Tortricidae. It is found in Europe, China (Jilin, Heilongjiang, Shaanxi, Gansu, Qinghai provinces), Korea, Japan, and Russia.

== Morphology ==
The wingspan is 16–21 mm. The forewings are elongate and the costa moderately arched, the fold reaching 1/3. The ground colour varies from whitish ochreous or brownish to ferruginous. It may have dark fine streaks, sometimes whitish-mixed. The basal patch has an angulated edge, and the central fascia narrows towards its extremities. Both are sometimes darker. A rounded triangular white or pale median dorsal blotch is sometimes replaced by a more elongate semi-oval, dark reddish-brown blotch. The termen is rather oblique. The hindwings are light grey. The larva is grey-whitish or dull greenish; head pale brown or partly black; plate of 2 whitish or brown.

== Ecology ==
The moth flies in one generation from July to September depending on the location.

The larvae mainly feed on birch (Betula species), hazel (Corylus avellana), and willow (Salix species).
