= 17th Weapons Squadron =

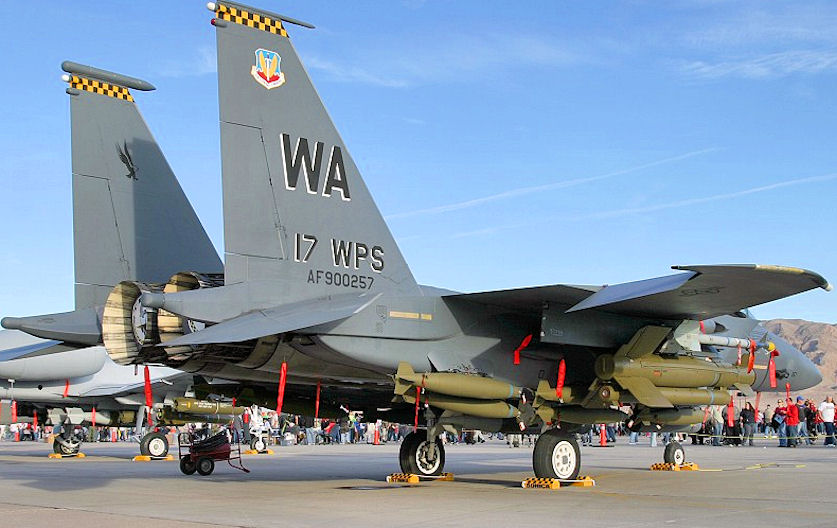
- 17th Weapons Squadron F-15E Strike Eagle (Note: Aircraft is McDonnell Douglas F-15E-50-MC Strike Eagle serial 90-0257.)
- Founded: 1917
- Country: United States
- Branch: United States Air Force
- Type: Squadron
- Role: Advanced F-15E Strike Eagle Training
- Part of: Air Combat Command
- Garrison/HQ: Nellis AFB, Nevada
- Nickname: Hooters
- Motto: Who Said Rats? (147th Aero Squadron)
- Tail Code: "WA"
- Engagements: World War I Southwest Pacific Theater; Vietnam War; Desert Storm
- Decorations: Distinguished Unit Citation; Air Force Outstanding Unit Award with Combat "V" Device; Air Force Outstanding Unit Award; Republic of Vietnam Gallantry Cross with Palm; Philippine Presidential Unit Citation

Insignia
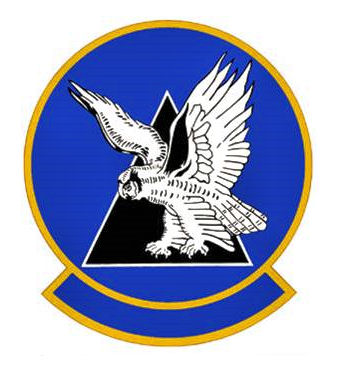
- 17th Weapons Squadron emblem (approved 28 February 2004)

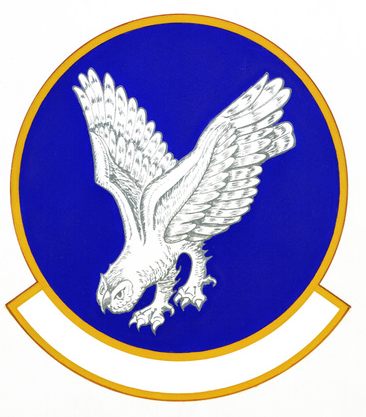
- 17th Tactical Fighter Squadron emblem (approved 28 February 1984)

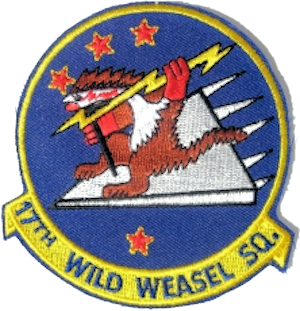
- Patch with unofficial 17th Wild Weasel Squadron emblem

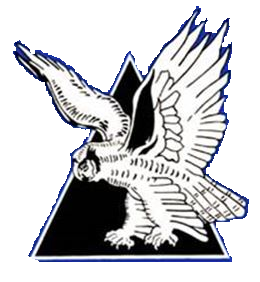
- 17 Pursuit Squadron emblem (approved 3 March 1924) (Note: The official approved emblem merely noted the owl was on a black background, but the squadron used a white-bordered triangle as the background. Maurer, p.96. See 17th Aero Squadron emblem.)

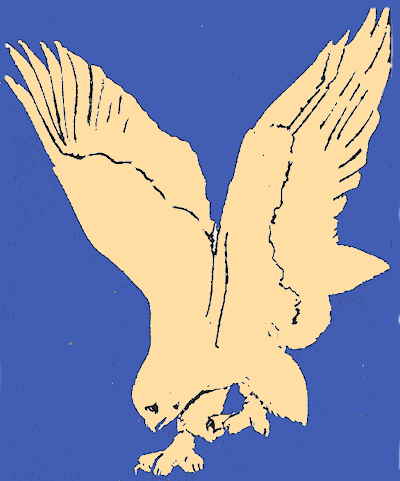
- 17th Aero Squadron emblem (approved 18 November 1918)

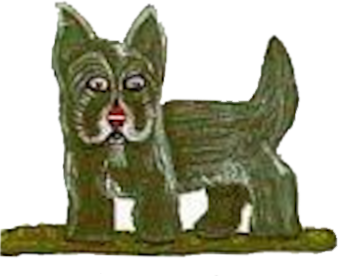
- 147th Aero Squadron emblem (approved 18 November 1918)

The 17th Weapons Squadron is a United States Air Force unit, assigned to the USAF Weapons School at Nellis Air Force Base, Nevada.

The squadron traces its lineage to the United States Army Air Service's 17th and 147th Aero Squadrons, both of which were active during World War I. The 147th was redesignated the 17th Pursuit Squadron in the post-war Air Service and later consolidated with the 17th Aero Squadron in 1936 to preserve the history of both pursuit units. The 17th Aero Squadron was activated in August 1917 and earned 13 campaign streamers in France flying the Sopwith Camel. The 147th Aero Squadron was organized in November 1917 and flew the Nieuport 28 and SPAD S.XIII fighters, earning eight streamers.

During World War II, the 17th Pursuit Squadron participated in the defense of the Philippines flying the Curtiss P-40 Warhawk and garnering the first American Ace of World War II. Wiped out during the Battle of the Philippines, some of its squadron members endured the Bataan Death March. Reactivated during the Vietnam War, the squadron went on to fly Republic F-105F Thunderchief Wild Weasel aircraft, and in Operation Desert Storm flying the General Dynamics F-16C Fighting Falcon.

== Mission ==
Flying the McDonnell Douglas F-15E Strike Eagle, the squadron accomplishes its mission by providing graduate-level instructor academic and flying courses to USAF Combat Air Forces (CAF). The squadron conducts extensive technical off-station training and liaises with CAF units.

The 17th emblem, modified from the one adopted in 1917, consists of a Great White Snowy Owl in front of a black triangle with a blue background. Because of its distinctive Owl Patch, the squadron's nickname is the Hooters.

== History ==
=== World War I ===
==== 17th Aero Squadron ====
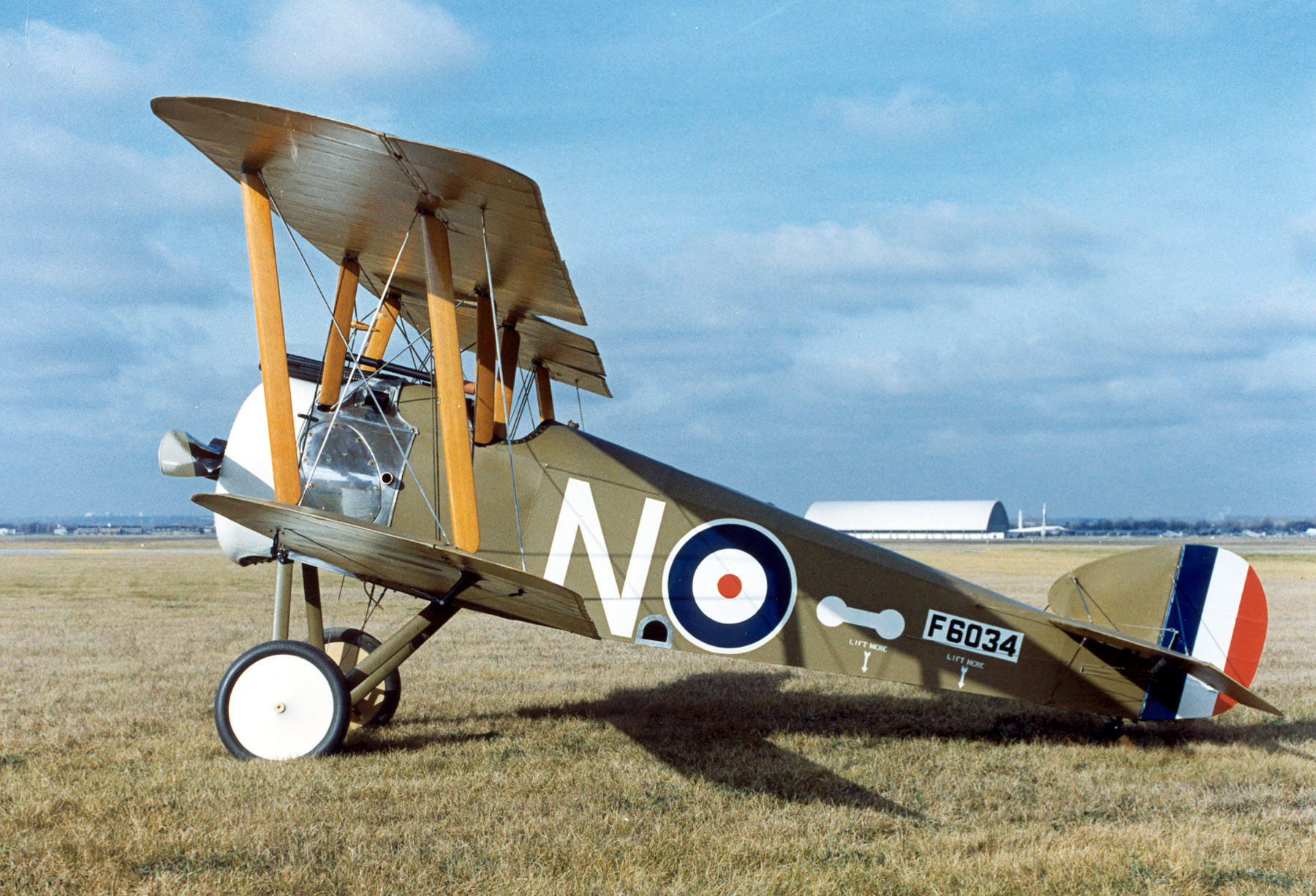
Replica 17th Aero Squadron Sopwith F-1 Camel (Note: This aircraft is on display at the National Museum of the United States Air Force. It was made by USAF personnel from the original World War I factory drawings, and was completed in 1974. The aircraft is painted and marked with the squadron's RAF white dumbbell painted on each side of the fuselage aft of the cockpit as the Camel flown by Lt. George A. Vaughn Jr. who earned the Distinguished Service Cross, Britain's Distinguished Flying Cross, and was a Silver Star recipient. Vaughn was America's second-ranking Air Service ace to survive the war. Franks, Norman, et al.)

Company A, Remount Station, Fort Sam Houston, Texas was organized on 13 May 1917, about a month after President Wilson declared war on Germany. It was later redesignated Company M, and later, Company B. On 16 June, its personnel were organized as the 29th Provisional Aero Squadron, Aviation Section, Signal Corps, which was redesignated the 17th Aero Squadron on 30 July. It was made of entirely of volunteers.

The unit was the first United States aero squadron sent to Canada to be trained by the British; the first squadron to be completely trained prior to be sent overseas with its complete quota of trained pilots; the first squadron to be attached to British Royal Air Force (RAF) squadrons and the first to be sent into combat.

The squadron entered combat as a pursuit unit with British Second and Third Armies from 15 July-28 October 1918 seeing extensive combat during the Battle of the Somme while serving with the RAF. In October 1918 the squadron was requested by the Americans to be transferred to the American Expeditionary Forces (AEF) and it was reassigned to Second Army on 1 November 1918 and prepared for operations on American front but did not become combat-ready before the end of hostilities on 11 November 1918. It was demobilized in 1919. One of the aces serving in the squadron during World War I was Robert Miles Todd.

On 17 October 1936, the World War I 17th Aero Squadron was consolidated with the United States Army Air Corps 17th Pursuit Squadron.

==== 147th Aero Squadron ====
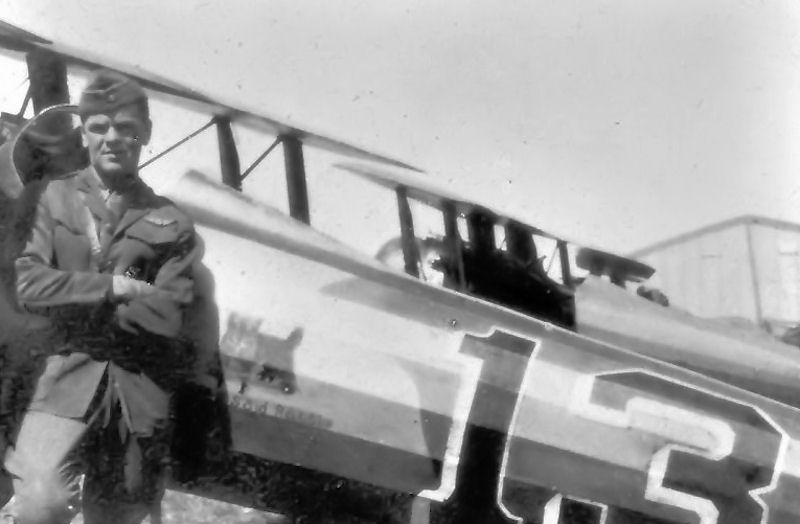
Lt. Wilbert Wallace White, 147th Aero Squadron. (Note: Lt. White was a flight commander for the squadron and gained nine victories during his service. He was killed on 10 October 1918, when he rammed a German Fokker D.VII on the tail of an inexperienced pilot. White was posthumously recommended for the Medal of Honor, but was instead awarded an Oak Leaf Cluster to his Distinguished Service Cross. Franks et al,; Franks & Bailey,)

The 147th Aero Squadron was organized at Kelly Field, Texas on 11 November 1917. It was ordered directly to Fort Worth, Texas for training at Everman Field #2, Camp Taliaferro. It trained in Texas until February 1918, when it deployed to France, where additional training was received. It became part of the 1st Pursuit Group in June.

Initially flying French Nieuport 28 pursuit aircraft, the squadron was heavily engaged in combat in the Toul Sector and the Aisne-Marne Sector. It was part of the defense against the German offensive in mid-July in the Champagne-Marne, then went on the offensive during the Aisne-Marne during July. It took part in the St. Mihiel offensive, and the great American Meuse-Argonne Offensive which continued until the Armistice with Germany on 11 November 1918.

During its time in combat, the squadron gained 62 victories and suffered nine casualties. The squadron flew 2,000 combat hours.

=== Inter-war period ===
After returning to the United States in April 1919 nearly all of the 147th's personnel were demobilized. The War Department created a new 1st Pursuit Group between late April and mid-August 1919 when it dispatched a small cadre of personnel to Selfridge Field, Michigan. New recruits and veterans from other flying units became members of the new 147th Squadron, and by late summer the process was complete. However, on 28 August, the squadron departed by train to Kelly Field, Texas where it became part of the new Advanced Pursuit Training School.

At Kelly Field, the squadron was assigned to the re-formed 1st Pursuit Group, effective 22 August 1919. The pursuit school was the first step in building a new permanent air service and by providing a course of instruction for pilots at Kelly, it was a way to transfer the hard-earned knowledge gained during World War I to a new generation of fliers. Pilots received hands-on experience in aircraft and engine maintenance. They also flew a training program that covered formation flying, aerobatics, air-to-air and air to ground gunnery, reconnaissance and patrol tactics. The aircraft used were British Royal Aircraft Factory S.E.5s and U.S.-built Airco DH.4s that were excess from the war effort.

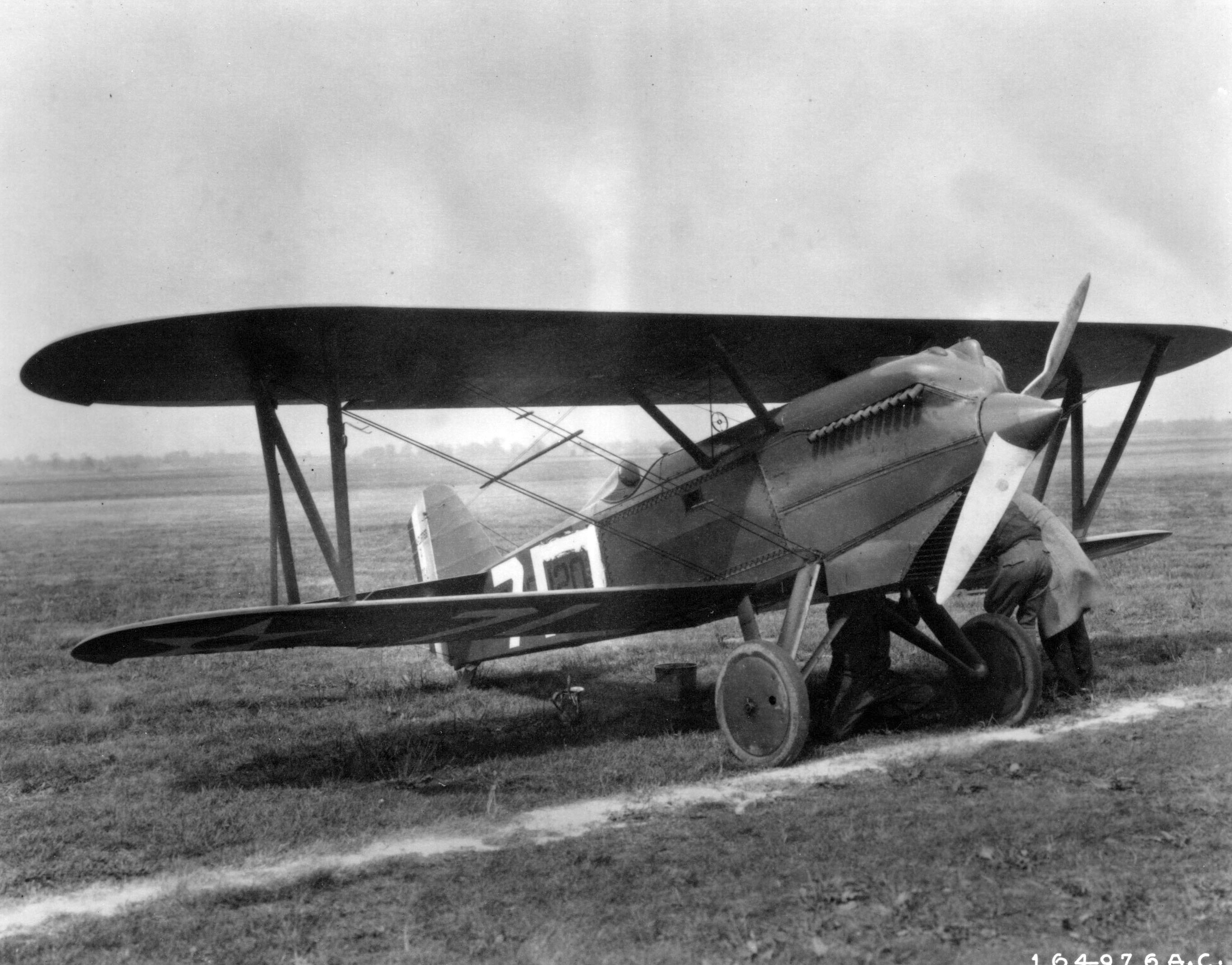
17th Squadron Curtiss PW-8 configured as the XPW-8B prototype for the P-1 Hawk, 1925

On 14 March 1921, the 147th was redesignated as the 17th Squadron (Pursuit) and in July the 1st Pursuit Group moved from Kelly to Ellington Field, near Houston, Texas. In June 1922, the 1st Group prepared to return to Selfridge. The four squadrons of the group (17th, 27th, 94th and 95th) departed Ellington on 24 June. The long deployment to Michigan was a novelty, and the press followed the group's progress closely. The group arrived at Selfridge Field on 1 July 1922. Selfridge served as the 1st Pursuit Group's home for many years. As the Army's only pursuit group, the War Department took special pains to ensure that it was maintained in a high state of readiness. On 21 January 1924, the War Department sanctioned unit emblems. The "Great Snow Owl", chosen by the World War I 17th Pursuit Group as its emblem when transferred to the American Expeditionary Forces in 1918 was adopted by the 17th Pursuit Squadron on 4 March 1924.

In May 1924, the group opened a satellite airfield at Oscoda, Michigan to function as an aerial gunnery camp for the unit. Loud-Reames Aviation Field was renamed Camp Skeel, for World War I pilot Captain Burt E. Skeel, and was used as an aerial gunnery range and for winter maneuvers by the 1st Pursuit Group. During World War II, the facility would be expanded as Oscoda Army Air Field, as a training base. After the war, it would be expanded and become Wurtsmith Air Force Base.

During the 1920s, the unit participated in exercises, demonstrations, and maneuvers, events the War Department used as combined training and public relations exercises. Public and congressional interest in aviation was high. Equipped with fast, nimble, pursuit planes such as the Curtiss P-1 Hawk, the unit attracted the attention of the public wherever it appeared. Overall, the Twenties were a productive decade for the unit. The 1st Pursuit Group responded well to being the Air Corps' only group-level pursuit organization, and developed a well-trained force that responded to the demands placed on it.

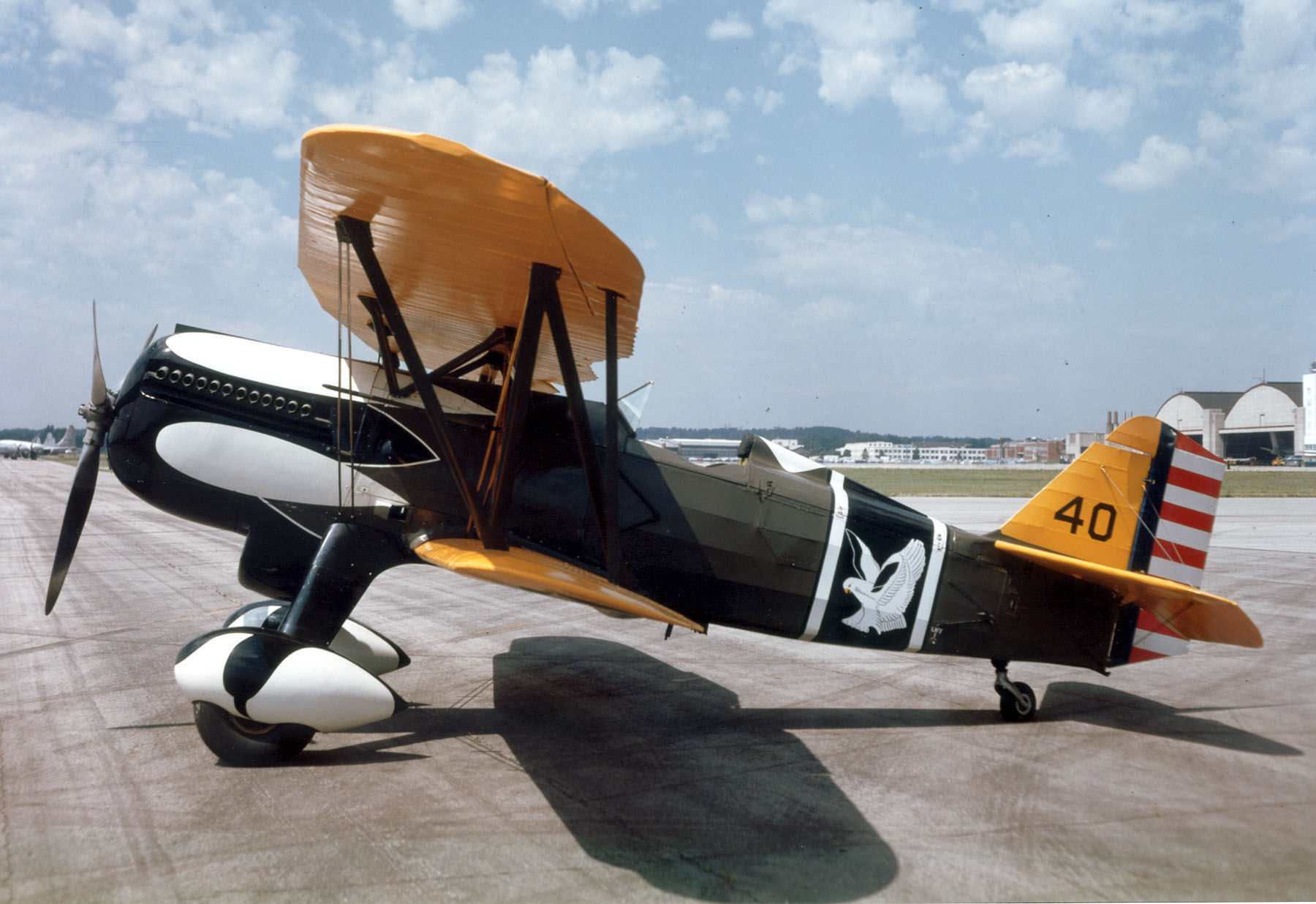
Curtiss P-6E Hawk in 17th Squadron markings. (Note: Aircraft is Curtiss P-6E Hawk serial 32-261, displayed at the National Museum of the United States Air Force in the colors and markings of the airplane assigned to Capt. Ross G. Hoyt, the 17th's commanding officer at Selfridge Field, MI in 1933.)

The 1930s produced a different set of challenges. During the Thirties, the group introduced at least six new aircraft into the Air Corps inventory. It also provided personnel for newly formed squadrons and groups. The onset of the Great Depression gave the unit additional responsibilities in 1931, the group participated in several air shows staged to benefit the unemployed. Squadron involvement ranged from two- and four-ship flights to squadron deployments. Beginning in 1933, the unit saw a handful of its officers detailed to work with the Civilian Conservation Corps, a New Deal program designed to put unemployed youths to work on various conservation projects.

The Curtiss P-6E Hawks flown by the squadron were improvements in the line of Hawks since the squadron received the P-1 in 1925. In 1934, it converted to the Boeing P-26A Peashooter, a low-wing, all-metal monoplane, and in 1937, it received the Seversky P-35, the first single-seat fighter in U.S. Army Air Corps to feature all-metal construction, retractable landing gear and an enclosed cockpit. 17 October 1936 saw the Air Corps formally consolidate the 17th Pursuit Squadron with the World War I 17th Aero Squadron. With the consolidation, the combat history and lineage of its World War I predecessor became a part of the 17th.

The growing threat of war with the Japanese Empire in the Philippine Islands led to the 17th Squadron to be relieved from assignment to the 1st Pursuit Group and transferred to the Philippine Department. Leaving Selfridge on 31 October, the squadron was reassigned to the 4th Composite Group at Nichols Field, near Manila in the Philippines, on 14 December 1940.

=== World War II ===
==== Battle of the Philippines ====
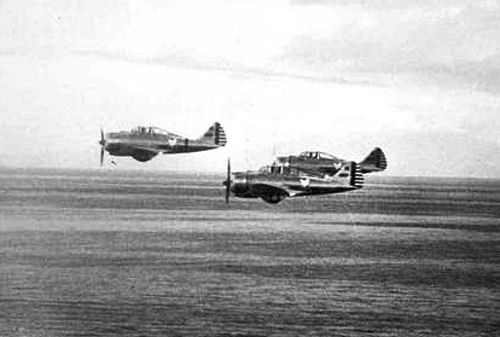
P-35s of the 17th Pursuit Squadron, 1941.

The 17th Pursuit Squadron had been sent overseas without aircraft to fly Seversky P-35s that had been held back from a sale to Sweden to reinforce the Philippines. Until their aircraft arrived and were assembled in March 1941, they practiced in the Boeing P-26 Peashooters that then constituted the interceptor force at Nichols Field. By late 1941 standards, the P-35A was hopelessly obsolescent. It was too lightly armed and lacked either armor around the cockpit or self-sealing fuel tanks, and the instruments of the aircraft flown by the 17th were marked in Swedish and calibrated in the metric system.

When new Curtiss P-40E Warhawks arrived in September 1941, the 17th was happy to hand down the Severskys to the 34th Pursuit Squadron, recently arrived from the United States without its aircraft. With the 3d and 20th Pursuit Squadrons, the 17th formed the interceptor component of the Philippine Department's 4th Composite Group. On 1 October 1941 the squadrons were reassigned to the newly created 24th Pursuit Group and became part of the Far East Air Force (FEAF) when it stood up in November.

After word was received of the attack on Pearl Harbor, FEAF units gathered in anticipation of the Japanese attack everyone knew would be coming. However, attack orders against known Japanese forces on Formosa were not forthcoming. "We can't attack till we're fired on". By 11:00 am both the 20th and 17th Pursuit Squadrons were on the ground at Clark Field. Both had been flying patrol missions during the morning and needed to refuel. While the planes were being serviced, the pilots went to eat; as soon as they had eaten, they returned to their planes and went on alert. The 17th, who had refueled first, was ready to go.

About 11:30 am, a message from Iba Field reported a large formation of planes heading west over the China Sea, heading presumably for Manila. The 17th was ordered into the air to patrol over the Bataan Peninsula and the entrance to Manila Bay and intercept whatever the Japanese tried to send though. At that moment, the first formation of Japanese bombers appeared over Clark Field. They came over the unprotected field in a V-formation at a height estimated at 22,000 to 25,000 feet, dropping their bombs on the aircraft and buildings below, just as the air raid warning sounded. As at Pearl Harbor, the Japanese achieved complete tactical surprise. The 17th and 21st Pursuit Squadrons, on patrol over Bataan and Manila, received no warning of the raid, and thus did not attack the Japanese aircraft.

The Japanese followed up their success of the first day of war with air attacks that completed the destruction of American airpower in the Philippines. Before dawn of the 9th, seven Japanese naval bombers struck Nichols Field near Manila, opening the next round, but the remainder of that day's attackers were grounded on Taiwan by fog. On the 10th they struck Nichols and Del Carmen Airfields in full force in the early afternoon. The pattern set at Clark Field two days earlier was repeated. High-level bombers came in first and hit the barracks, offices, and warehouses. The fighters then came in at low level to strafe the grounded planes and installations. An entire flight of 17th planes returning to refuel was shot down by Zeros, although all the pilots survived. There was no antiaircraft fire and no fighter protection over the field.

By that time American airpower was at a low ebb. There were only 22 P-40s in commission, with six more promised if they could be repaired in time. With FEAF thus reduced in strength, it was decided to use the remaining planes for reconnaissance in order to conserve them as long as possible. The pursuit planes were based at Clark and Nichols, and the heavy bombers were withdrawn to Del Monte. On the morning of the 12th, few American planes remained to hinder the Japanese.

With almost all of the squadron's aircraft destroyed, the men of the ground echelon were pressed into service as infantry under the 5th Interceptor Command. On Christmas Eve of 1941, the 17th's ground echelon evacuated Nielson Field and went by train to Bataan. There they took part in the Battle of the Philippines. However, most of its aircraft were destroyed on the ground, by Japanese air raids. Some 17th personnel later fought as infantry during the Battle of Bataan and, after their surrender, were subjected to the Bataan Death March.

==== Defense of Java ====
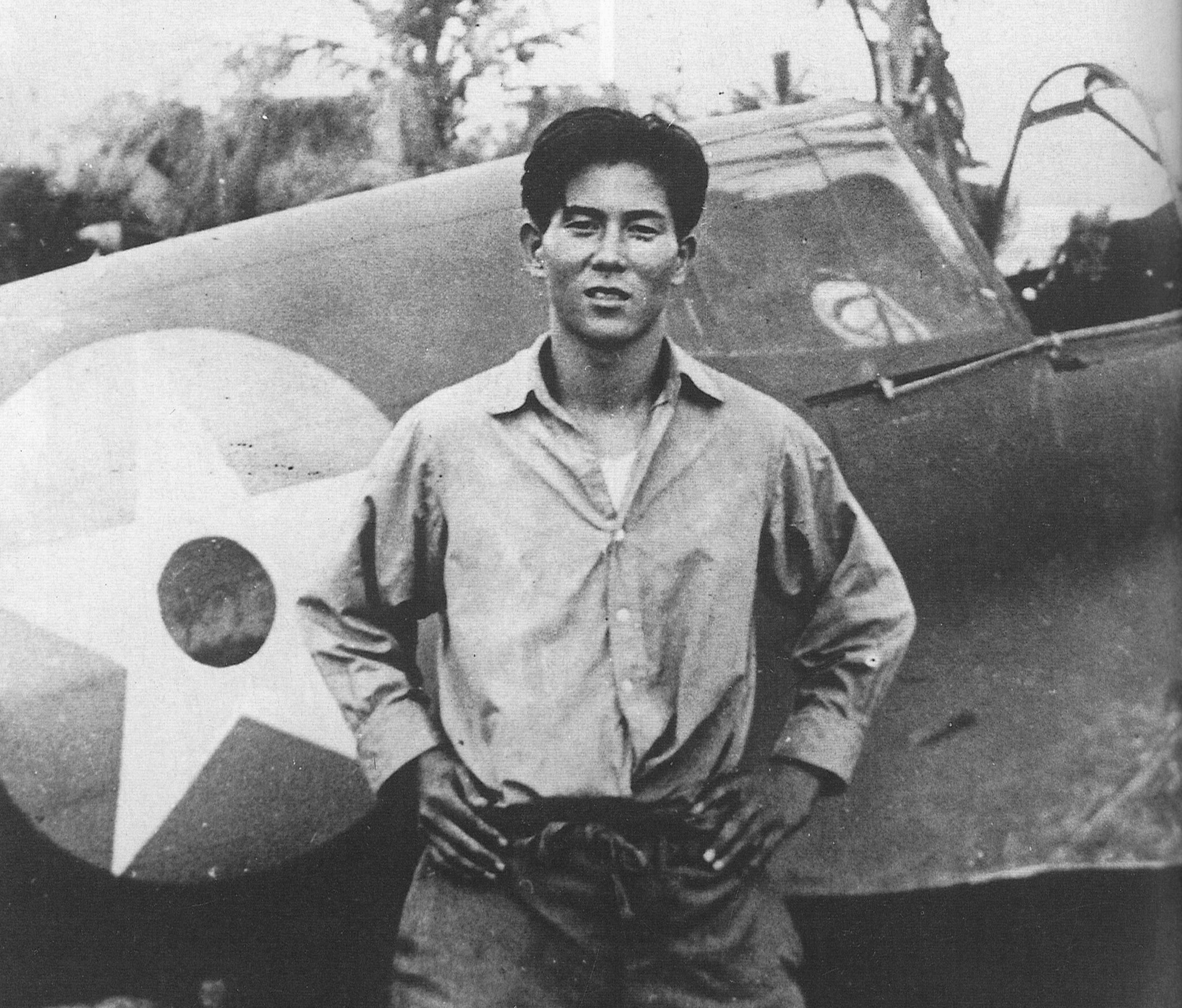
Junichi Sasai standing before a crashed Curtiss P-40 in the Netherlands East Indies, 1941. (Note: Sasai had downed a 17th Squadron P-40 on 18 February 1942.)

Other members of the 17th escaped to Australia, where they collected new P-40s (see Pensacola Convoy) and reformed as the 17th Pursuit Squadron (Provisional). In January 1942, the squadron undertook a flight across Australia and the Arafura Sea, to Java and took part in the Dutch East Indies Campaign, where it claimed 49 Japanese aircraft destroyed, for the loss of 17 P-40s. At the end of February, as Japanese ground forces approached, the squadron handed over its surviving aircraft to the Dutch military and returned to Australia.

What remained of the 17th Pursuit Squadron was integrated into other American units in Australia. Fifth Air Force carried the squadron as an active, unmanned unit through the end of the war. Lastly, 2 April 1946, the unit was placed in inactive status. It would remain inactive until almost the end of the Vietnam War.

=== Vietnam War ===
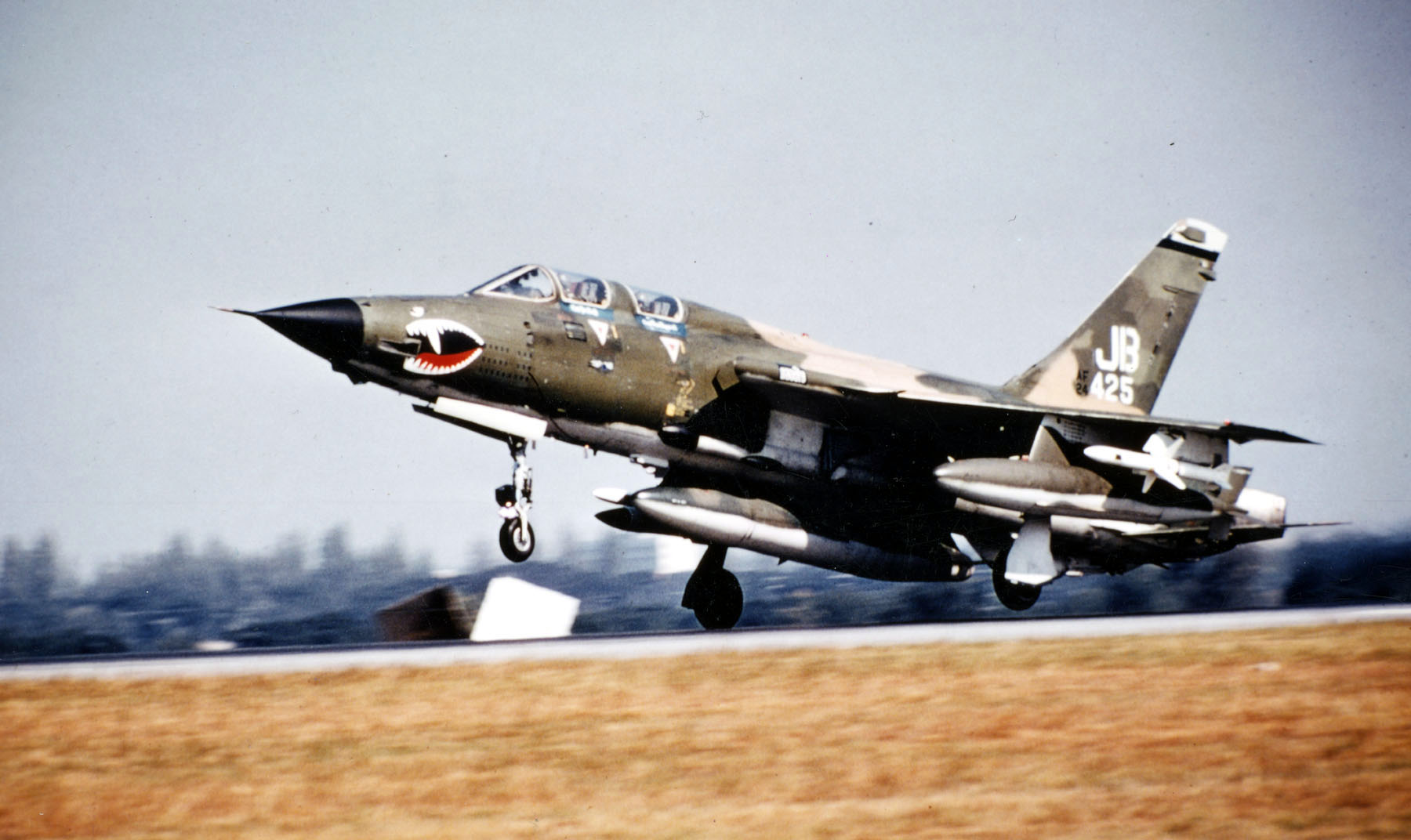
17th Wild Weasel Squadron F-105G landing at Korat RTAFB (Note: Aircraft is Republic F-105G Thunderchief serial 62-4225 on the last day of the Linebacker II raids, 29 December 1972. It is now on display at Blissfield, MI.)

It was reactivated on 12 November 1971 as the 17th Wild Weasel Squadron, and assumed the mission, personnel, and Republic F-105G Thunderchief Wild Weasel IV of the inactivating 6010th Wild Weasel Squadron. The mission of the 17th was the destruction of North Vietnamese surface-to-air-missile batteries by destroying or otherwise shutting down their guidance radars, leaving enemy missile sites effectively blind and impotent. The electronic weapons officer in the rear seat of the Wild Weasel F-105G operated a battery of sophisticated electronic equipment which was capable of detecting the emissions from enemy radars and determining the exact location of their sources. Once these sites were identified, the Wild Weasel aircraft could attack them with a battery of AGM-45 Shrike anti-radar missiles, which were designed to home in on an enemy radar transmission and follow it all the way to its source and destroy it. The Wild Weasel aircraft would also carry powerful jamming equipment which was designed to confuse the enemy radar installation or to misdirect any surface-to-air missiles that might be launched. Alternatively, the Wild Weasel crew could direct other aircraft toward the missile sites, which would be attacked by iron bombs or cannon fire.

After the end of American military flights over North Vietnam in January 1973, the squadron maintained the capability to deliver Wild Weasel support for operations over Cambodia of Boeing B-52 Stratofortress, General Dynamics F-111 Aardvark, and McDonnell F-4 Phantom II aircraft until August 1973. It maintained an alert mission until the squadron was inactivated in 1974. The squadron's aircraft were returned to the United States, being assigned to the 35th Tactical Fighter Wing at George Air Force Base, California.

=== 17th Tactical Fighter Squadron ===
Reactivated as the 17th Tactical Fighter Squadron in early 1982 at Shaw Air Force Base, South Carolina, assigned to the newly redesignated 363d Tactical Fighter Wing as the wing was converting from a McDonnell RF-4C Phantom II tactical reconnaissance mission to General Dynamics F-16 Fighting Falcons.

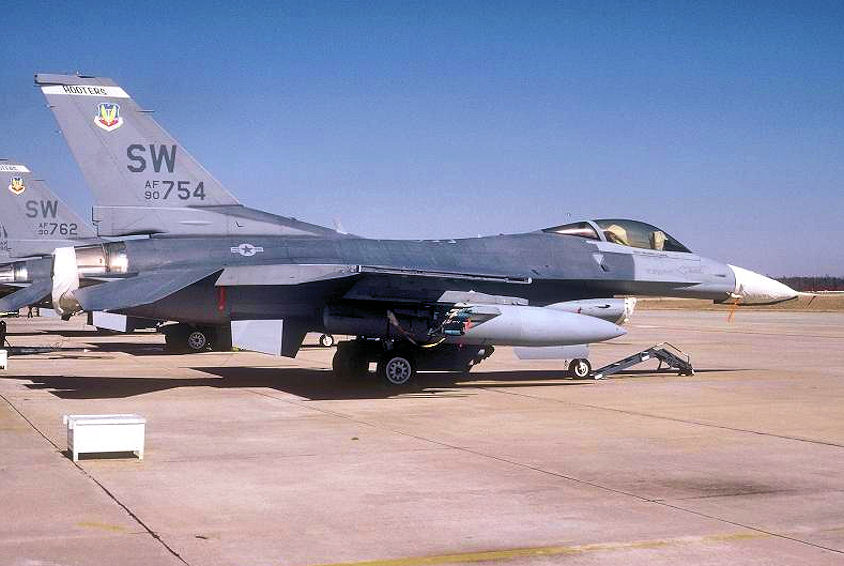
17th Fighter Squadron F-16C (Note: Aircraft is General Dynamics Block 42J F-16C Fighting Falcon serial 90-754.)

The initial aircraft received were Block 10 F-16A models, but shortly afterwards the first block 15 aircraft started to arrive. The responsibility of the 17th was close air support, air interdiction, suppression of enemy air defenses and armed reconnaissance to support worldwide contingencies. For this mission the squadron was eventually equipped with Block 50 aircraft and the AGM-45 Shrike anti-radiation missile. This was one of a few units within the USAF that flew with this missile.

In 1985 the squadron was upgraded to the Block 25 F-16C from the General Dynamics factory in Fort Worth. These aircraft were more capable in comparison with the former block 15 models. Also new weapon systems could now be introduced, like the CBU-87 Combined Effects Munition.

After the Iraqi invasion of Kuwait in August 1990, the 24 aircraft of the 17th were deployed to Al Dhafra Air Base, Abu Dhabi, United Arab Emirates on 9 August 1990 and started flying air defense missions over the Saudi kingdom as part of Operation Desert Shield. When Operation Desert Storm started in January 1991 the squadron was at the forefront of air operations.

Upon their return to the United States, in March 1991, the squadron started receiving some brand-new block 42 F-16s. Their primary mission of air interdiction remained the same. During 1993 the first rumors came that the entire wing was to be disbanded. The news was quickly acknowledged. On 31 December 1993 the squadron was inactivated in favor of squadrons from the senior 20th Fighter Wing, which was moving from the closed RAF Upper Heyford, England to Shaw as part of the USAFE drawdown at the end of the Cold War. The squadron transferred its aircraft and personnel to the 20th Fighter Wing, and the 17th Fighter Squadron, along with the entire 363d Fighter Wing was inactivated.

After lying dormant for ten years, the 17th was reactivated at Nellis AFB in February 2003, and renamed the 17th Weapons Squadron. Equipped with Boeing F-15E Strike Eagles, they fly direct support of the U. S. Air Force Weapons School, assigned to the 57th Wing.

== Lineage ==
17th Aero Squadron

- Organized as the 29th Provisional Aero Squadron on 16 June 1917

Redesignated 17th Aero Squadron on 30 July 1917
Demobilized on 1 April 1919
Consolidated with the 17th Pursuit Squadron as the 17th Pursuit Squadron on 17 October 1936

17th Weapons Squadron

- Organized as the 147th Aero Squadron on 11 November 1917

Redesignated 17th Squadron (Pursuit) on 14 March 1921
Redesignated 17th Pursuit Squadron on 25 January 1923

- Consolidated with the 17th Aero Squadron on 17 October 1936

Redesignated: 17th Pursuit Squadron (Interceptor) on 6 December 1939
Inactivated on 2 April 1946

- Redesignated 17th Wild Weasel Squadron on 12 November 1971

Activated on 1 December 1971
Inactivated on 15 November 1974

- Redesignated 17th Tactical Fighter Squadron on 11 December 1981

Activated on 1 July 1982
Redesignated 17th Fighter Squadron on 1 November 1991
Inactivated on 31 December 1993

- Redesignated 17th Weapons Squadron on 24 January 2003

Activated on 3 February 2003

=== Assignments ===
17th Aero Squadron

- Post Headquarters, Kelly Field, 16 June 1917
- Training Section, Air Service, 4 August 1917 (attached to the Royal Flying Corps)
- Post Headquarters, Camp Taliaferro, Texas, 12 October 1917 (attached to the Royal Flying Corps)
- Aviation Concentration Center, 23 December 1917 – 9 January 1918
- American Expeditionary Forces, 11 February-30 October 1918 (attached to Royal Air Force)
- No, 65 Wing RAF, 20 June 1918
- No. 13 Wing RAF, 18 August 1918
- 4th Pursuit Group, 4 November 1918
- 1st Air Depot, AEF, 12 December 1918 – 15 January 1919
- Unknown, 15 January-1 April 1919

17th Weapons Squadron

- Post Headquarters, Kelly Field, 10 November 1917
- Post Headquarters, Camp Taliaferro, Texas, 12 November 1917 (attached to the Royal Flying Corps for training)
- Aviation Concentration Center, 19 February-5 March 1918
- American Expeditionary Forces, 25 March-1 June 1918 (attached to Second Aviation Instruction Center, 25 March-22 April 1918)
- 1st Pursuit Group, Air Service, 1st Army, AEF, 1 June–December 1918
- Unknown, December 1918–22 August 1919
- 1st Pursuit Group, 22 August 1919
- 4th Composite Group, 14 December 1940
- 24th Pursuit Group, 1 October 1941 – 2 April 1946
- 388th Tactical Fighter Wing, 1 December 1971 – 15 November 1974
- 363d Tactical Fighter Wing (later 363d Fighter Wing), 1 July 1982 (attached to 363d Tactical Fighter Wing Provisional, 9 August 1990 – 13 March 1991)
- 363d Operations Group, 1 May 1992 – 31 December 1993
- USAF Weapons School, 3 February 2003 – present

=== Stations ===
17th Aero Squadron

- Camp Kelly (later Kelly Field), Texas, 16 June 1917
- Toronto, Ontario, Canada, 4 August 1917 (detachments at Deseronto, Ontario and Camp Borden, Ontario, after c. 25 August 1917)
- Hicks Field, Camp Taliaferro, Texas, c. 14 October 1917
- Aviation Concentration Center, Garden City, New York, 23 December 1917 – 9 January 1918
- Liverpool, England, 25 January 1918
- Romsey RC, Winchester, England, 25 January 1918
- France, 10 February 1918

Unit divided into four flights which operated from various stations in Nord-Pas-de-Calais, Somme, and Oise Departments, until squadron reassembled on 20 June 1918

- Petite Synthe Aerodrome, France, 20 June 1918
- Auxi-le-Château Aerodrome, France, 19 August 1918

Detachment operated from Beugnatre Airdrome, 10–20 September 1918

- Sonchamp Aerodrome, France, 20 September 1918
- Gengault Aerodrome, France, 4 November 1918
- Colombey-les-Belles Airdrome, France, 12 December 1918
- Nantes, France, 15 January-7 March 1919
- Garden City, New York, c. 20 March-1 April 1919

17th Weapons Squadron

- Kelly Field, Texas, 11 November 1917
- Benbrook Field, Camp Taliaferro, Texas, 12 November 1917
- Hicks Field, Camp Taliaferro, Texas 22 December 1917
- Garden City, New York, 19 February-5 March 1918
- Tours Aerodrome, France, 25. March 1918
- Epiez Aerodrome, France, 22 April 1918
- Gengault Aerodrome, France, 1 June 1918
- Touquin Aerodrome, France, 28 June 1918
- Saints Aerodrome, France, 9 July 1918
- Rembercourt Aerodrome, France, 1 September 1918
- Colombey-les-Belles Airdrome, France, 12 December 1918
- Brest, France, 5 February-8 March 1919
- Garden City, New York, 19 March 1919
- Selfridge Field, Michigan, 27 April 1919
- Kelly Field, Texas, 31 August 1919
- Ellington Field, Texas, 1 July 1921
- Selfridge Field, Michigan, 1 July 1922
- Nichols Field, Luzon, Philippines, 5 December 1940

Operated from Clark Field, Luzon, Philippines, 9–24 December 1941

- Bataan Airfield, Luzon, Philippines, 25 December 1941 – April 1942

Air echelon operated from Lubao Field, Luzon, Philippines, 25–31 December 1941
Air echelon operated from Del Monte Airfield, Mindanao, Philippines, c. 8 April–May 1942

- Korat Royal Thai Air Force Base, Thailand, 1 December 1971 – 15 November 1974
- Shaw Air Force Base, South Carolina, 1 July 1982 – 31 December 1993

Deployed to Al Dhafra Air Base, United Arab Emirates, 9 August 1990 – 13 March 1991

- Nellis Air Force Base, Nevada, 3 February 2003 – present

=== Aircraft ===
17th Aero Squadron

- Curtiss JN-4, 1917
- Sopwith F-1 Camel, 1918
- SPAD S.XIII, 1918

17th Weapons Squadron

- Nieuport 28, 1918
- SPAD S.XIII, 1918, 1921–1922
- Royal Aircraft Factory S.E.5, 1919–1922
- Thomas-Morse MB-3, 1922–1925
- Dayton-Wright DH-4, 1919–1925
- Curtiss PW-8 Hawk, 1924–1926
- Curtiss P-1 Hawk, 1926–1930
- Boeing P-12, 1930–1932
- Curtiss P-6 Hawk, 1932–1934, 1936–1938
- Boeing P-26 Peashooter, 1934–1938, 1940–1941
- Seversky P-35, 1938–1940, 1941
- Lockheed C-40 Electra, 1939–1940
- Curtiss P-40 Warhawk, 1941–1942
- Republic F-105 Thunderchief, 1971–1974
- General Dynamics F-16 Fighting Falcon, 1982–1993
- McDonnell Douglas F-15E Strike Eagle, 2003–present

== Awards and campaigns ==
Award streamer	Award	Dates	Notes
	Distinguished Unit Citation	Philippine Islands 7 December 1941 – 10 May 1942	17th Pursuit Squadron
	Distinguished Unit Citation	Philippine Islands 8–22 December 1941	17th Pursuit Squadron
	Distinguished Unit Citation	Philippine Islands 6 January-8 March 1942	17th Pursuit Squadron
	Air Force Outstanding Unit Award with Combat "V" Device	18 December 1972-15 August 1973	17th Wild Weasel Squadron
	Air Force Outstanding Unit Award	[1 Jul 1982]-1 Jun 1983	17th Tactical Fighter Squadron
	Air Force Outstanding Unit Award	1 January 1988-30 December 1989	17th Tactical Fighter Squadron
	Air Force Outstanding Unit Award	1 January 1992-31 December 1993	17th Fighter Squadron
	Philippine Republic Presidential Unit Citation	7 December 1941-2 March 1946	17th Pursuit Squadron
	Vietnamese Gallantry Cross with Palm	1 Dec 1971-28 Jan 1973	17th Wild Weasel Squadron

Campaign Streamer	Campaign	Dates	Notes
	Picardy	1918	17th Aero Squadron
	Somme Defensive	21 March 1918 – 6 April 1918	17th Aero Squadron
	Lorraine	1918	147th Aero Squadron
	Montdidier-Loyon	1918	147th Aero Squadron
	Flanders	1918	17th Aero Squadron
	Champagne	1918	147th Aero Squadron
	Ile-de-France	1918	147th Aero Squadron
	Champagne-Marne	15 July 1918 – 18 July 1918	147th Aero Squadron
	Aisne-Marne	18 July 1918 – 16 August 1918	147th Aero Squadron
	Somme Offensive	8 August 1918 – 11 November 1918	17th Aero Squadron
	Oise-Aisne	18 August 1918 – 11 November 1918	147th Aero Squadron
	St Mihiel	12 September 1918 – 16 September 1918	147th Aero Squadron
	Meuse-Argonne	26 September 1918 – 11 November 1918	147th Aero Squadron
	Philippine Islands	7 December 1941 – 10 May 1942	17th Pursuit Squadron
	Commando Hunt VII	1 December 1971 – 29 March 1972	17th Wild Weasel Squadron
	Vietnam Ceasefire Campaign	29 March 1972 – 28 January 1973	17th Wild Weasel Squadron
	Defense of Saudi Arabia	9 August 1990 – 16 January 1991	17th Tactical Fighter Squadron
	Liberation and Defense of Kuwait	17 January 1991 – 13 March 1991	17th Tactical Fighter Squadron

== See also ==
- George Augustus Vaughn Jr.
- Howard Burdick
- Howard Clayton Knotts
- List of American aero squadrons
- Lloyd Andrews Hamilton
- Robert Olds
- William Dolley Tipton
