= Kenneth Lee Porter =

American flying ace (1896–1988)

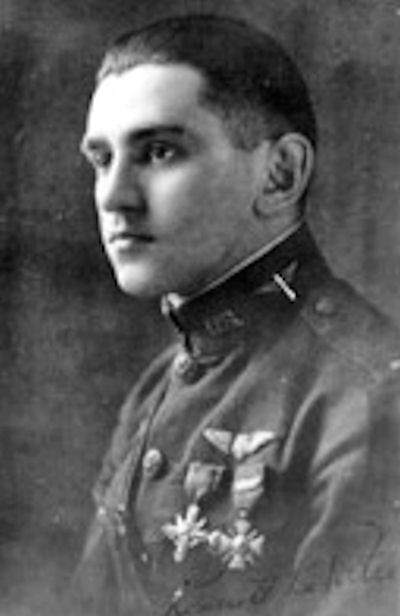
- Lieutenant Kenneth Lee Porter
- Born: 6 December 1896; Dowagiac, Michigan, US
- Died: 3 February 1988 (aged 91); Queens, New York City, US
- Burial place: Arlington, Virginia, US
- Education: University of Michigan
- Military career
- Allegiance: United States
- Branch: Air Service, United States Army
- Service years: 1917–1919
- Rank: Lieutenant
- Unit: 147th Aero Squadron
- Conflicts: World War I
- Awards: Distinguished Service Cross; Croix de Guerre avec Palme

Lieutenant Kenneth Lee Porter was a World War I flying ace credited with five aerial victories.

== World War I service ==
Porter was an engineering graduate from the University of Michigan who joined the U.S. Army Air Service in August 1917. He reported to the 147th Aero Squadron in February 1918. While on patrol with Ralph O'Neill and four other American pilots, they shot down a Pfalz D.III over Château Thierry on 2 July. After switching his Nieuport 28 for a Spad XIII, Porter would score four more times, from 28 September through 12 October 1918, sharing his scores with Wilbert White, Francis Simonds, and three other pilots. He also became a Flight Commander. He received the Distinguished Service Cross and the French Croix de Guerre.

== Postwar ==
He worked for Burroughs Corporation and the Pesco Pump Co. in New York until World War II. During the war, he worked with Boeing. Afterwards, he returned to civilian engineering.

== See also ==
- List of World War I flying aces from the United States

== Bibliography ==
- American Aces of World War I. Norman Franks, Harry Dempsey. Osprey Publishing, 2001. ISBN 1-84176-375-6, ISBN 978-1-84176-375-0.
