= 147th Aero Squadron =

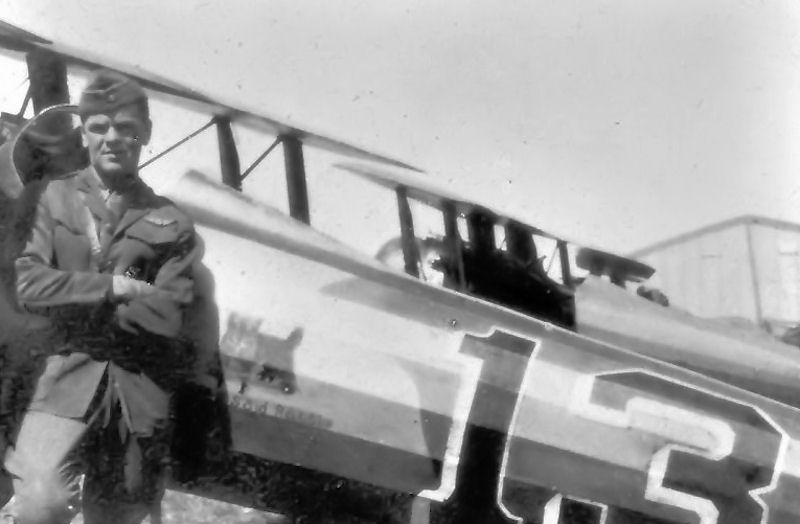
- Lt. Wilbert Wallace White, 147th Aero Squadron. He was a Flight Commander for the Squadron and gained 8 victories during his service.
- Active: 11 November 1917–Present
- Country: United States
- Branch: United States Army Air Service
- Type: Squadron
- Role: Pursuit
- Part of: American Expeditionary Forces (AEF)
- Engagements: World War I

Commanders
- Notable commanders: Maj. Geoffrey H. Connell; Lt. John A. Hambleton; Capt. James A. Meissner

Insignia
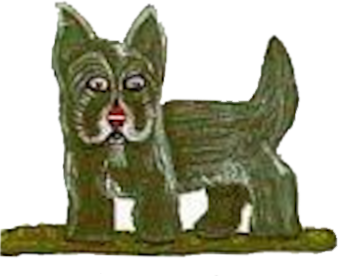
- 147th Aero Squadron Emblem

Aircraft flown
- Fighter: Nieuport 28; Royal Aircraft Factory S.E.5; Airco DH.4; Spad XIII
- Trainer: Curtiss JN-4, 1917

Service record
- Operations: 1st Pursuit Group; Western Front, France: 29 May-11 November 1918
- Victories: Enemy Aircraft shot down: 28; Enemy Balloons shot down: 3; Total Enemy Aircraft Destroyed: 31; Air Aces: 6: Lt. James A. Healy, 5 (3 shared); Capt. James A. Meissner, 4 (2 shared)* *Meissner had a total of 8 confirmed aerial victories, 4 of them shared. 4 of the victories came while he was with the 94th Aero Squadron, before transferring to the 147th A.S.; Lt. Ralph A. O'Neill, 5 (all shared); Lt. Kenneth L. Porter, 5 (4 shared); Lt. Francis M. Simonds, 5 (all shared); Lt. Wilbert Wallace White, 8 (2 shared)

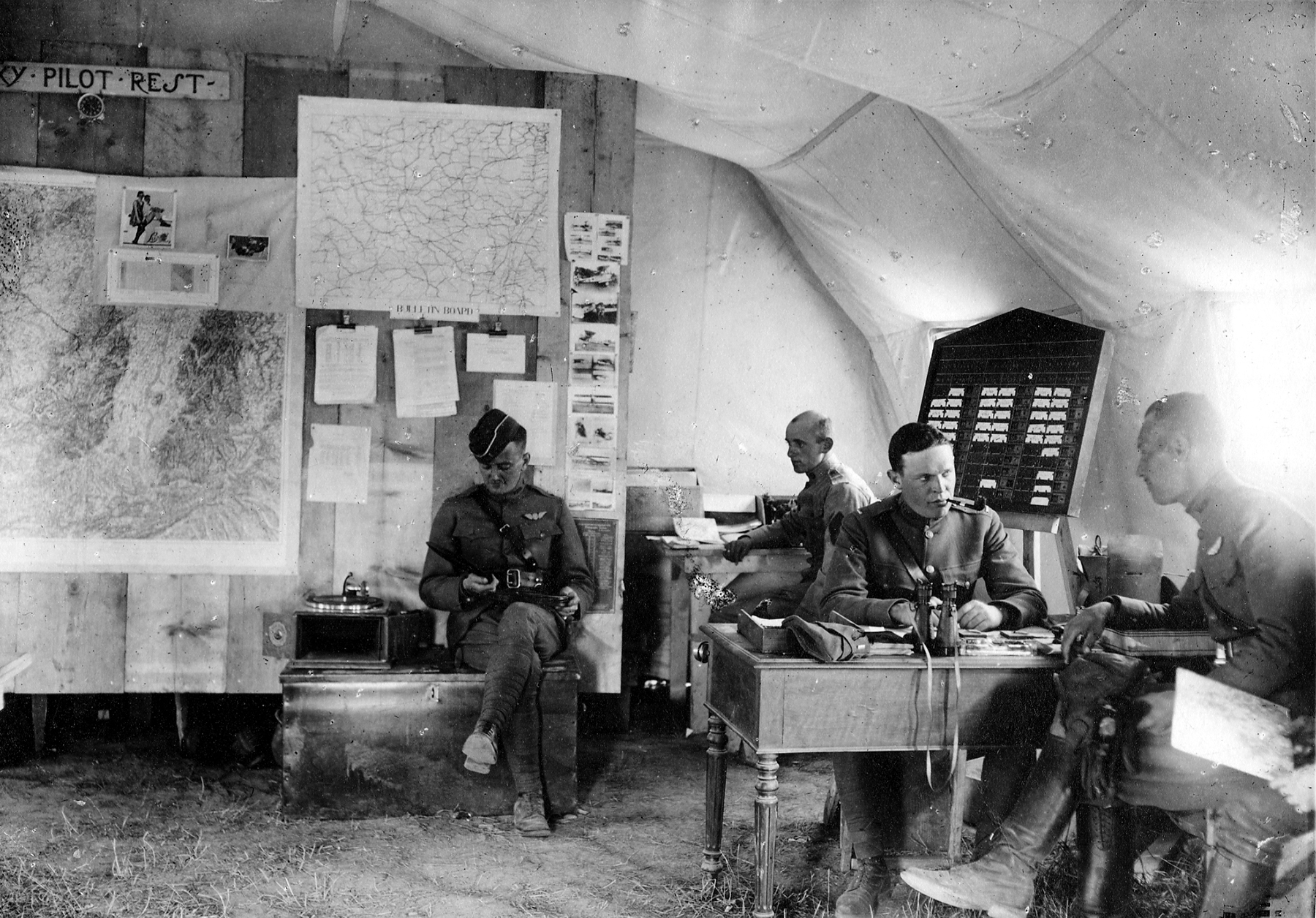
Operations Office of the 147th Aero Squadron in France, May–June 1918

The 147th Aero Squadron was a United States Army Air Service unit that fought on the Western Front during World War I.

The squadron was assigned as a Day Pursuit (Fighter) Squadron as part of the 1st Pursuit Group, First United States Army. Its mission was to engage and clear enemy aircraft from the skies and provide escort to reconnaissance and bombardment squadrons over enemy territory. It also attacked enemy observation balloons, and perform close air support and tactical bombing attacks of enemy forces along the front lines.

After the 1918 Armistice with Germany, the squadron returned to the United States in March 1919 and became part of the permanent United States Army Air Service in 1921, being re-designated as the 17th Squadron (Pursuit).

The current United States Air Force unit which holds its lineage and history is the 17th Weapons Squadron, assigned to the USAF Weapons School, Nellis Air Force Base, Nevada.

== History ==
=== Origins ===
The 147th Aero Squadron began as a widely scattered group of men, mostly in Texas who arrived at Kelly Field during the summer of 1917 where they spent time on learning the rudiments of soldiering. On 10 November 1917, the unit was organized and given a designation. Once formed, they were ordered to proceed to Everman Field (#2), Camp Taliaferro, Texas, near Fort Worth. At Everman Field, the men received a most practical and excellent training in the hands of the Canadian Royal Flying Corps. The course training for mechanics being completed, the squadron was then transferred to Hicks Field (#1) at Camp Taliaferro, where primary flight training was conducted for the flight cadets.

When formed, the squadron consisted of some 300 men, all of which were candidates for flying training. The rapid and thorough training given by the RCFC resulted in numerous accidents. Training consisted of bombing, photography, contact patrol, artillery observation, and scout combats and patrols. Upon completion of the training, the 147th Aero Squadron consisted of 30 flying officers and 193 men, with five more pilots to follow. On 14 February 1918, the squadron entrained at Hicks Field, and was bound for Garden City, New York for overseas travel. The squadron arrived on the 19th and was quarantined, as the camp was in an ill condition. The officers were kept clear of the quarantine and spent their time in New York City or at home if possible. On 5 March the 147th was ordered to board the RMS Cedric bound for Liverpool, England. A stop was made at Halifax, Nova Scotia on 8 March, and the trans-Atlantic trip was uneventful. Landing was made at Liverpool on 14 March. After disembarking, the squadron was marched from the docks to the Liverpool railway station where it boarded a London and North Western Railway train which took them to Winchester, Hampshire, near the south coast of England. Arriving in the late afternoon the squadron was moved to the Romsey Rest Camp. Everyone was held in camp until 21 March, when the squadron traveled by train to Southampton in the morning. That afternoon, the men boarded the "Northwestern Miller", which left the harbor in a thick fog, also carrying horses and cattle.

All though that day and evening, the men and officers remained on the boat that night and all of the next day as the ship sailed through a very thick, cold, damp fog. On the second night the boat crossed to the French coast however the fog prevented entrance into Le Havre harbor. Finally, on the third evening the ship docked, and the men finally arrived on French soil. Then a six-mile march was made in rain and darkness to another rest camp, arriving after midnight, the squadron fully drenched, worn out and sleeping in small, dark tents which were as cold and wet as the march had been. The next afternoon, the squadron was again marched to the Le Havre railway station and entrained for Tours Aerodrome, reaching it the night of 25 March. Every phase of the trip had been the most tiring and miserable, and everyone was glad to have at least gotten somewhere. At Tours, the squadron spent the balance of March awaiting news about where they would be going next. On 31 March, the flying officers were sent to Issoudun Aerodrome, the US Third Aviation Instruction Center, for a course of training on the Nieuport 28 aircraft the squadron was to be assigned. The balance of the squadron remained at Tours, training insofar as much as it was possible.

The end of April saw the squadron depart Tours and move to Epiez Aerodrome, about 25 miles from the Toul lines. Here, the final organization of the squadron was made, and the receipt of the Nieuport 28 airplanes. Training continued with practice formations and an occasional alert when enemy aircraft were seen or rumored to be in the vicinity. On 31 May, the squadron moved to the Croix de Metz Aerodrome, near Toul and formal combat operations over the lines commenced.

=== Toul Sector operations ===
The first formation of the 147th Aero Squadron to fly in combat was led by Lieutenant Loomis of the 95th AS. The 94th and 95th squadrons had been operating over the lines for over a month, and it gave the 147th experienced pilots to show us the sector. The first patrol was uneventful, it accomplished its object. Many in the squadron were rather surprised as there has been nothing exciting, that the pock-marked lines seemed so quiet, and no Germans were in the air. The fact was that we failed to realize the danger, but that was soon to change. Over the next several days the squadron began a routine of three scheduled patrols, lasting about an hour each, and then three or four voluntary patrols each day. On 4 June, the squadron performed seven patrols with the object of keeping enemy observation photographers from coming over. The first of these patrols saw Lt. O'Neill and Lt. Larwence at an altitude of 5,000 meters when Larwence dived away. O'Neill followed him down and caught him in the heavy clouds between 3,000 and 1,000 meters. Larwence made a motion to descend and the two went below the clouds. Then Larwence lost control of his Niewuport and fell into a left spin. He was spinning when he hit the ground and the plane immediately caught fire. O'Neill landed and found him dead. Larwence was presumed to have become sick shortly before he dived down.

In the days that followed, saw a continuance of these same types of patrols. Few enemy aircraft were in the sector and the Germans seemed of a respectful nature. However, on 25 June, an entire formation became lost. An hour before dawn two Flights of squadron aircraft took off to meet some of our Salmson 2 photographic planes returning from the vicinity of Metz. While waiting for them to appear, the squadron's "A" Flight formation was broken up by a terrific anti-aircraft barrage near the city. The Salmsons did not appear and the squadron's Nieuports flew from the barrage separately. Lt. Asheden landed in Switzerland after having been lost during a two hours flight. Lt. Brotherton was also lost, then managed to find the Rhine River landed in our line trenches when he ran out of petrol. Another pilot landed in a swamp near Baccarat and still another crashed near Lunéville. Only one pilot returned to Toul successfully. Later that dame day, orders came to be ready to move to the Marne Sector. On 27 June, the squadron left for Touquin Aerodrome, the pilots flying down the following day.

=== Marne Sector operations ===
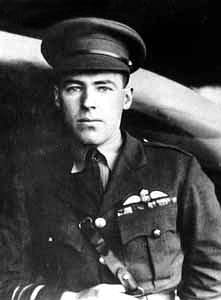
Ralph Ambrose O'Neill.

The beginning of July saw more German air activity in the sector. Eight aircraft left Toul about 16:30 in two echelons of four each. About 17:30 the low flight saw five German Pfalz D.III scout planes crossing the line at Château-Thierry. It was engaged in combat and Lt O'Neill drove one down out of control. Both of his guns then jammed and he was forced to withdraw, with two enemy aircraft on his tail. Lt. Raible engaged another but both of his guns jammed. Lt. Siemonds motor gave trouble and was also force to withdraw and make an emergency landing while Lt Perry attacked and downed the one he engaged. Meanwhile, high flight was in aerial combat with seven more Pfalz. Lt. Porter got on the tail of the leader and shot him down. Three other enemy aircraft were shot down by other members of the flight. It was the first significant combat for the 147th Squadron and it had met the enemy, eight to twelve and brought down half his formation. For the next few days, there were no enemy engagements of substance to report. It was on 8 July the first member of the squadron was lost in action. Lt. Maxwell O. Perry was lost when ten of the 147th flew well into enemy territory chasing their aircraft and he failed to return.

On 9 July the squadron moved to Saints Aerodrome and continued to operate from there. On the 15th, the German offensive on the Marne began. The RAF 9 Brigade came down from the British Sector and their assistance was invaluable. Aerial combat was engaged in the succeeding days. On one patrol Lt Abernathy wandered away from his formation and he encountered six Fokker biplanes. In the fight that ensured he shot down one Fokker, but was forced to land near the lines when his plane was badly shot up by bullets. For this engagement he received the Distinguished Service Cross and the Croix de guerre with palm. The counter-offensive began on the 18th and the 147th flew two and often three patrols a day, and met considerable opposition in the air. Lt Brotheron shot down an enemy balloon and Simonds received the Croix de Guerre for strafing German troops and ground positions behind their lines. On the 24th a formation of six met twelve Fokkers and forced a fight, shooting down four. The same afternoon, Lt. White met two German aircraft and shot them both down. He received the DSC.

=== Saint Mihiel operations ===
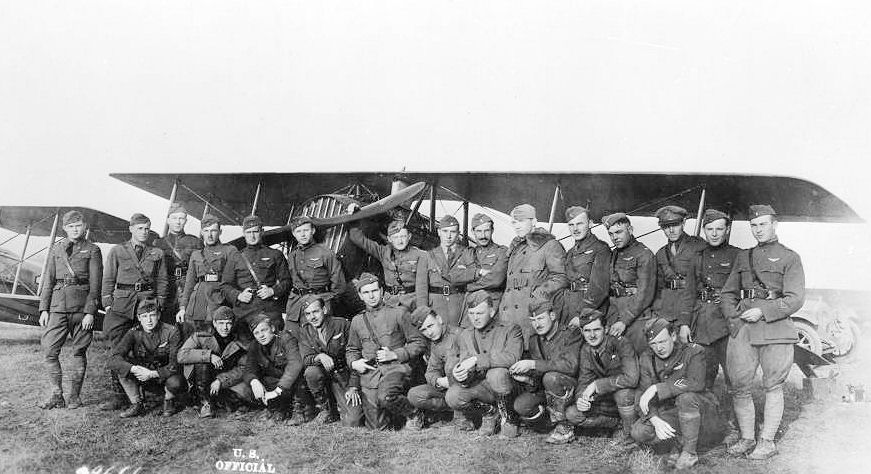
147th Aero Squadron group photo with a SPAD XIII. Likely taken at Rembercourt Aerodrome, France, November 1917. (Kneeling second from right is LT Josiah P. Rowe Jr. of Fredericksburg, Virginia – author of Letters from A World War I Aviator and owner/editor of The Free Lance–Star)

On 15 August the squadron ferried its Nieuport 28s to Orly Airport and exchanged them for SPAD S.XIIIs, and the rest of the month was spent getting the SPADs in shape. The SPADs ranged from very reliable to motors that never ran at all. It began an era of forced landings caused by unreliable motors. At the end of 1 August Pursuit Group became a part of First Army and moved to Rembercourt Aerodrome, and everyone was anxious to get into this new push hoping it would be the last show. During the beginning of the month, the squadron did patrols just over the Airdrome, however on 4 September the 137th flew into enemy territory looking for German aircraft but found none to report. The squadron patrolled between Saint-Mihiel and Watronville, but everything was quiet as the Toul sector had been in June. When the American forces launched the St. Mihiel offensive on 12 September squadron patrols went out one after another. With no enemy aircraft, it was possible to fly low and the squadron's pilots returned with much valuable information of enemy forces on the ground. On the 16th significant contact was made with an enemy two-seat Rumpler observation plane, it was attacked and shot down. A few moments later they attacked another Rumpler and also shot it down. Then while returning home alone, Lt Love encountered five German Halberstadt CL.IV fighters. He fired on the enemy but was forced to withdraw. Later in the day, three squadron planes went on a balloon strafing mission, shooting down one.

On the 24th the squadron's sector was changed and it began patrolling between the Argonne and Verdun, and its mission was changed from air interdiction to ground support of advancing Army forces, normally flying below 800 meters. The first task was to shoot down German observation balloons. The Meuse-Argonne Offensive began on the 26th and each day before daylight patrols to attack enemy balloons were sent out. Low patrols continued throughout October.

On the 2d, Lt Jones brought down a Halberstadt biplane well inside our lines. Many German planes were seen in the air every day and combat was frequent, with the squadron being frequently outnumbered. On 10 October Lt. White shot down a Hannover CL in conjunction with Lt. Porter and another pilot shortly past noon.

Three hours later, Lt White took off again. He had already become the 147th Aero Squadron's leading ace and had orders to return to the United States when he flew this last sortie. When he saw a Fokker D.VII on the tail of an inexperienced pilot, White intervened. When his guns jammed so he couldn't fire at the enemy, he instead rammed the German instead, to score his eighth victory. White was posthumously recommended for the Medal of Honor, but was instead awarded an Oak Leaf Cluster to his DSC.

During the balance of October, the usual patrols took place with large German Fokker formations were frequently encountered, with air-to-air combat taking place. During the first days of November, patrols were kept up, even though the weather was unfavorable. It was during this time rumors of an armistice were about, and the enemy was not very active. The squadron's patrols collected valuable intelligence that was passed down to the ground units. On 11 November hostilities ceased and the 147th Aero Squadron made its last patrol over the lines.

During its time in combat, the squadron gained 62 victories and suffered nine casualties. The squadron flew 2,000 combat hours.

=== Demobilization ===
Proficiency flights were conducted after the Armistice with Germany, however, no flights were permitted to be flown over German-controlled territory. The squadron remained at Rembercourt for about a month. On 12 December 1918 orders were received from First Army for the squadron to report to the 1st Air Depot, Colombey-les-Belles Airdrome to turn in all of its supplies and equipment and was relieved from duty with the AEF. The squadron's SPAD aircraft were delivered to the Air Service American Air Service Acceptance Park No. 1 at Orly Aerodrome to be returned to the French. There practically all of the pilots and observers were detached from the squadron.

During the organization's stay at Colombey, the men attended to the usual camp duties. Personnel at Colombey were subsequently assigned to the commanding general, services of supply, and ordered to report to one of several staging camps in France. There, personnel awaited scheduling to report to one of the base ports in France for transport to the United States and subsequent demobilization. On 5 February 1919, the 147th was moved to Base Station No. 5 near the port of Brest prior to its return to the United States. Upon arrival the men were caught up on any back pay owed to them, de-loused, a formal military records review was performed and a passenger list was created prior to the men boarding a ship.

On 8 March 1919, the 147th Aero Squadron boarded a troop ship and sailed for New York Harbor, arriving on the 18th. It proceeded to Camp Mills, Long Island, on 19 March where the personnel of the squadron were demobilized and returned to civilian life.

=== Lineage ===
- Organized as 147th Aero Squadron on 10 November 1917

Re-designated: 147th Aero Squadron (Pursuit), June 1918
Re-designated: 17th Squadron (Pursuit) on 14 March 1921

=== Assignments ===
- Post Headquarters, Kelly Field, 10–12 November 1917
- Aviation Section, U.S. Signal Corps

Attached to the Royal Flying Corps, 12 November 1917 – 19 February 1918

- Aviation Concentration Center, 19 February-5 March 1918
- Headquarters, Chief of Air Service, AEF, 25 March-1 June 1918
- 2d Air Instructional Center, 25 March-22 April 1918
- 1st Pursuit Group, Air Service, 1st Army, AEF, 1 June-12 December 1918
- 1st Air Depot, AEF, 12 December 1918 – 5 February 1919
- Commanding General, Services of Supply, 5 February 1919
- Eastern Department, 19 March 1919

=== Stations ===
- Kelly Field, Texas, 10 November 1917
- Benbrook Field (#2), Camp Taliaferro, Texas, 12 November 1917
- Hicks Field (#1), Camp Taliaferro, Texas 22 December 1917
- Aviation Concentration Center, Garden City, New York, 19 February 1918 – 5 March 1918
- Port of Entry, Hoboken, New Jersey

Trans-Atlantic crossing: RMS Cedric, 5–14 March 1918

- Liverpool, England, 14 March 1918
- Romsey Rest Camp, Winchester, England, 15 March
- Le Havre, France, 23 March 1918
- Tours Aerodrome, France, 25 March 1918
- Epiez Aerodrome, France, 22 April 1918
- Croix de Metz Aerodrome, Toul, France, 1 June 1918
- Touquin Aerodrome, France, 28 June 1918
- Saints Aerodrome, France, 9 July 1918
- Rembercourt Aerodrome, France, 1 September 1918
- Colombey-les-Belles Airdrome, France, 12 December 1918
- Brest, France, 5 Feb-8 Mar 1919
- Camp Mills, New York, 19 March 1919

=== Combat sectors and campaigns ===
Streamer	Sector/Campaign	Dates	Notes
	Toul Sector	2–27 June 1918; 4–11 September 1918	
	Aisne-Marne Sector	29 June-14 July 1918	
	Champagne-Marne Defensive Campaign	15–18 July 1918	
	Aisne-Marne Offensive Campaign	18 July-6 August 1918	
	Vesle Sector	7–13 August 1918	
	St. Mihiel Offensive Campaign	12–16 September 1918	
	Verdun Sector	17–25 September 1918	
	Meuse-Argonne Offensive Campaign	26 September-11 November 1918	

=== Notable personnel ===
- Lt. Thomas J. Abernathy, DSC, CdG, 3 aerial victories
- Lt. Tyler C. Bronson, CdG, 1 aerial victory
- Lt. William E. Brotherton, DSC, CdG, 3 aerial victories
- Lt. Meredith L. Dowd, DSC (KIA)
- Lt. Frank S. Ennis, 1 aerial victory
- Lt. James Andrew Healy, DSC, CdG, air ace, 5 aerial victories (Son of Rough Rider Daniel Healy – KIA Battle of San Juan Hill, Cuba)
- Lt. James P. Herron, 1 aerial victory
- Lt. Arthur H. Jones, DSC, SSC, CdG, 4 aerial victories
- Lt. Cleveland W. McDermott, DSC, CdG, 3 aerial victories
- Maj. James Armand Meissner, Squadron Commander, DSC (2x), air ace, 8 aerial victories (4 with the 94th Aero Squadron and 4 with the 147th Aero Squadron)
- Lt. Oscar B. Myers, CdG 2 aerial victories
- Lt. Ralph Ambrose O'Neill, DSC (3x), CdG, air ace, 5 aerial victories
- Lt. Maxwell O. Parry, 1 aerial victory
- Lt. Charles P. Porter, DSC (2x), CdG, 4 aerial victories
- Lt. Kenneth Lee Porter, DSC, CdG, air ace, 5 aerial victories
- Lt. Joseph C. Raible Jr., DSC, CdG, 2 aerial victories
- Lt. George A. S. Robertson, SSC, 1 aerial victory
- Lt. Louis C. Simon Jr., DSC (2x), CdG, 2 aerial victories
- Lt. Francis M. Simonds, SSC, CdG 4 aerial victories
- Lt. John H. Stevens, DSC, 1 aerial victory, (KIA)
- Lt. George C. Waters, 1 aerial victory
- Lt. Wilbert Wallace White, DSC (2x), CdG, air ace (KIA)
- Lt. Josiah P. Rowe Jr., author of Letters from a World War I Aviator

DSC: Distinguished Service Cross; SSC: Silver Star Citation; CdG: Croix de Guerre (France); KIA: Killed in Action

== See also ==
- Organization of the Air Service of the American Expeditionary Force
- List of American aero squadrons
