= New York, Rio, and Buenos Aires Line =

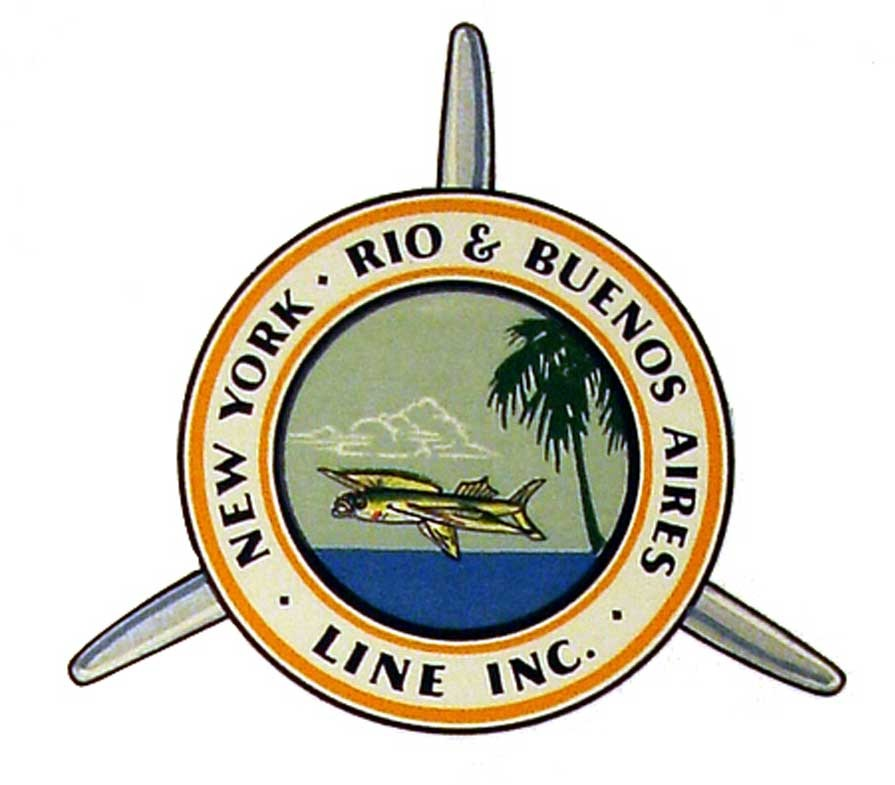
- Founded: 1929; 96 years ago
- Commenced operations: 1929; 96 years ago
- Ceased operations: 1930; 95 years ago
- Destinations: New York City, Rio de Janeiro, Buenos Aires
- Headquarters: New York
- Key people: Ralph A. O'Neill

New York, Rio, and Buenos Aires Line (NYRBA or NYRBA Air Lines) was an airline that operated seaplane service from New York City to Rio de Janeiro, Buenos Aires, and intermediate points on the east coast of South America during the 1920s. It was forced to merge into its competitor, Pan American World Airways, in 1930.

== History ==
NYRBA was founded by Colonel Ralph A. O'Neill, who had been a decorated ace fighter pilot in World War I and then been a main figure in the establishment of both civil and military aviation in Mexico. He was named the exclusive agent for Boeing and Pratt & Whitney in all of Latin America in 1927, and in his travels he conceived the idea for the airline.

A self-made man, O'Neill personally establishing all South American stops for NYRBA, created designs for the company's seaplanes with leading manufacturers, and arranged the financial backing for his new company. On August 21, 1929, NYRBA started to fly daily between Buenos Aires and Montevideo using the S-38. On September 1, 1929, a flight to Santiago de Chile was initiated and on November 29 on the same year, a flight between Buenos Aires and Yacuíba, Bolivia with multiple stops, started. Brazilian operations started on January 24, 1930, with the creation of its Brazilian subsidiary NYRBA do Brasil with flights along the Brazilian coast. The inaugural flight between Buenos Aires and Miami took place between February 19 and 25, 1930, using eight different Commodores seaplanes and from then on they became regular. Refueling bases consisted of barges and boats that were stationed every 125 to 460 miles along the routes. Most would fuel with five gallon tin cans shipped from Standard Oil in New Jersey. Passenger loads in March 1930 were 15% from Miami to Montevideo, 70% to Buenos Aires, and 45% to Santiago with 16 to 20 cents charged per mile.

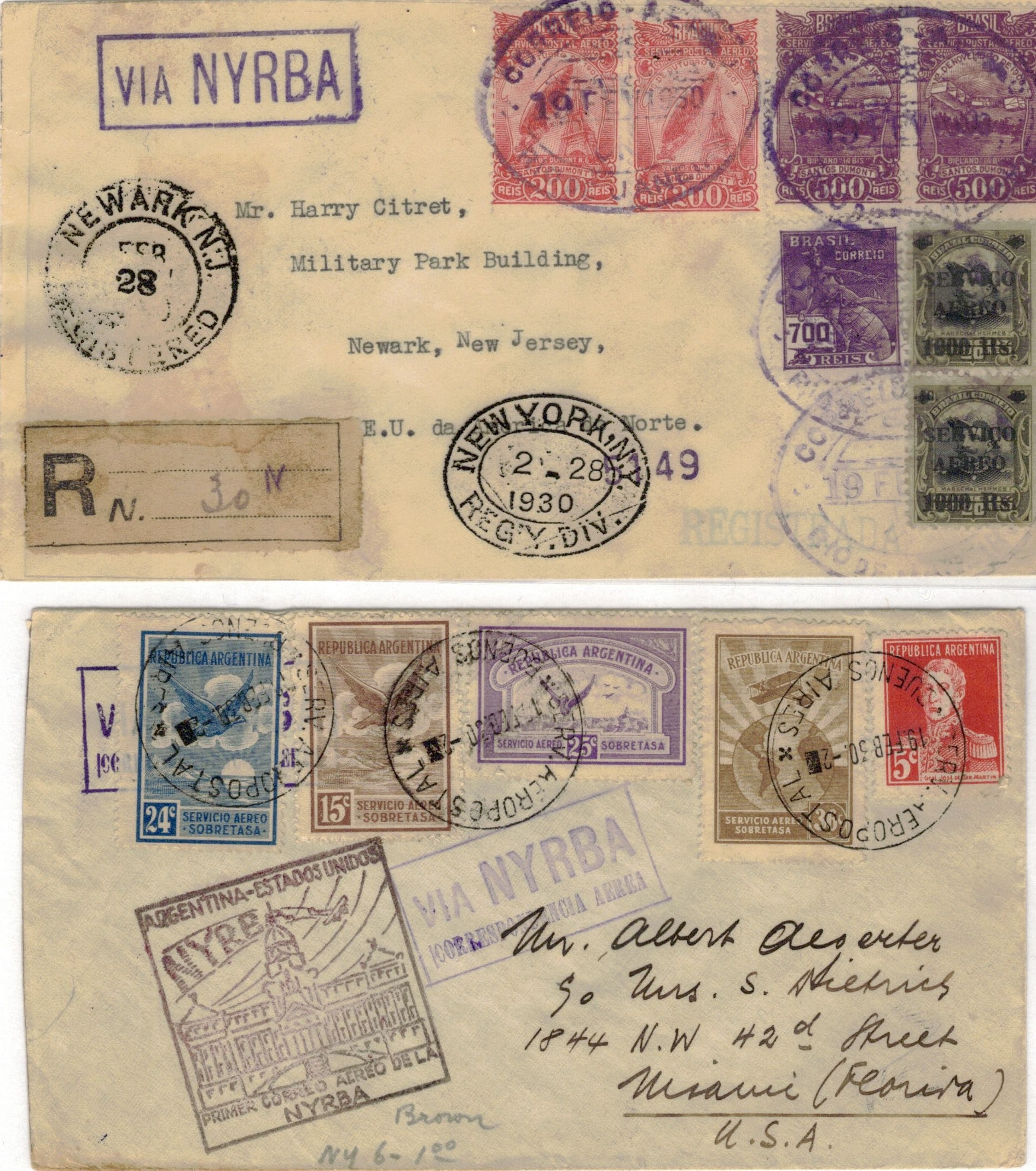
Two flown covers carried on NYRBA’s inaugural flight from Rio de Janeiro (upper) and Buenos Aires (lower) to Miami, February 19-25,1930

Another coup by O'Neill was to secure the Ponta do Calabouço landfill, considered the most valuable real estate in Rio de Janeiro, for use as NYRBA's base in the city.

With the construction of these first "airports", NYRBA was at the time, the world's longest airline, 7,800 miles.

O'Neill met callous opposition from Juan Trippe, who with his associates had taken control of Pan Am. Trippe, his wealthy Yale roommate Cornelius Vanderbilt Whitney, and their Aviation Corporation of the Americas chairman Richard Hoyt were related by marriage and close to the Second Assistant Postmaster General, W. Irving Glover, the professional head of the U.S. Post Office as the position of Postmaster General was a political sinecure. Glover refused to grant air mail contracts to any company not controlled by Trippe's triumvirate. This action was both highly illegal to monopoly laws and a morally corrupt abuse of power.

O'Neill soldiered on in the belief that an airline could actually support itself by carrying passengers, and managed to obtain backing from James Rand, Jr., head of Remington Rand, and others, and NYRBA took to the skies. Their proudest aircraft were the Consolidated Commodore flying boats, although they also used the Consolidated Fleetster, and the Sikorsky S-38.

After the onset of the Great Depression NYRBA's backers were coerced by Trippe and Glover to began to pull out their investments. Though the company's business was growing and it had far more assets, it was compelled to merge as the junior partner into Trippe's Pan Am under circumstances O'Neill described as "a shotgun wedding after a damnable rape". On August 19, 1930 Pan American took over NYRBA for the bargain price of US$2 million.

O'Neill, when offered to head Pan Am's East Coast operations, stated: "You can steal my house, but you can't ask me to run it for you".

While the aviation business thrived, with financial credit given to Pan Am which contrived to take even when it was still controlled by NYRBA, the Brazilian government re-appropriated Ponta do Calabouço. The subsidiary NYRBA do Brasil, which Pan American retained 100% of the shares until 1942, was renamed Panair do Brasil on November 21, 1930. It later became that country's flag carrier.

The NYRBA legacy has been greatly overshadowed by Pan Am, but its plethora of accomplishments cannot be denied.

== Destinations ==
NYRBA once served the following destinations:

- Buenos Aires
- Havana
- Miami
- Montevideo - Carrasco International Airport
- New York City
- Rio de Janeiro - Manguinhos Airport
- Santiago de Chile - Los Cerrillos Airport
- São Paulo - Congonhas International Airport
- Yacuíba - Yacuiba Airport

== See also ==
- List of seaplane operators
- List of defunct airlines of the United States
