= Wilbert Wallace White =

Wilbert Wallace Wright
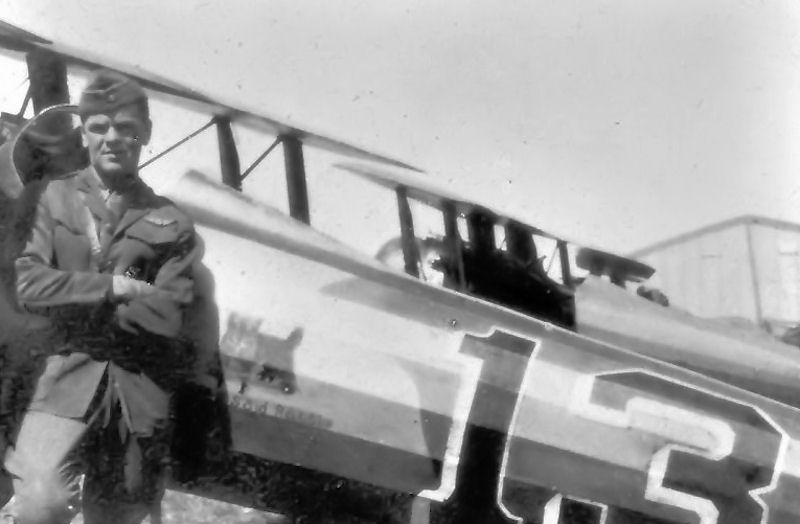
- Lt. Wilbert W. White, 147th Aero Squadron, 1918 with his Nieuport 28.
- Born: May 1, 1889; New York City, New York, US
- Died: October 10, 1918 (aged 29) near Dun-sur-Meuse, France
- Burial place: Meuse-Argonne American Cemetery, Romagne-sous-Montfaucon, France
- Military career
- Allegiance: United States
- Branch: Air Service, United States Army
- Service years: 1917 - 1918
- Rank: Lieutenant
- Nickname: Wilbur
- Unit: 147th Aero Squadron
- Conflicts: World War I
- Awards: Distinguished Service Cross with Oak Leaf Cluster, French Croix de Guerre

Lieutenant Wilbert Wallace White was an American World War I flying ace credited with eight aerial victories. He was recommended for the Medal of Honor for his self-sacrifice.

== Early life ==
The son of a Protestant minister had graduated from Mercersburg Academy in Pennsylvania in 1907 and the University of Wooster in Ohio in 1912, and was married with two children when he volunteered for military service.

== Aerial service ==
White enlisted in the U.S. Army Air Service in July 1917. He trained in Canada. He reported to the 147th Aero Squadron in February 1918. He scored a double victory to begin, shooting down two Fokker D.VIIs on 24 July 1918. On 14 September, he shot down a German observation balloon and another Fokker D.VII. On 27 September, he got two more victories, sharing one with two other pilots. On 10 October, he shot down a Hannover CL in conjunction with Kenneth Porter and another pilot shortly past noon.

Three hours later, he took off again. He had already become the 147th Aero Squadron's leading ace and had orders to return to the United States when he flew this last sortie. When he saw Jasta 10 German ace Wilhelm Kohlbach's Fokker D.VII on the tail of an inexperienced pilot, White intervened. White's guns jammed and he was unable to fire at Kohlbach, so he rammed the German instead, to score his eighth and Kohlbach's fifth victory. While White fell to his death, Kohlbach took to his parachute in one of the first fighter pilot bailouts in history. White was posthumously recommended for the Medal of Honor, but was instead awarded an Oak Leaf Cluster to his DSC.

== See also ==
- List of World War I flying aces from the United States

== Bibliography ==
- American Aces of World War I. Norman Franks, Harry Dempsey. Osprey Publishing, 2001. ISBN 1-84176-375-6, ISBN 978-1-84176-375-0.
