= Consolidated Commodore =

American seaplane

Commodore
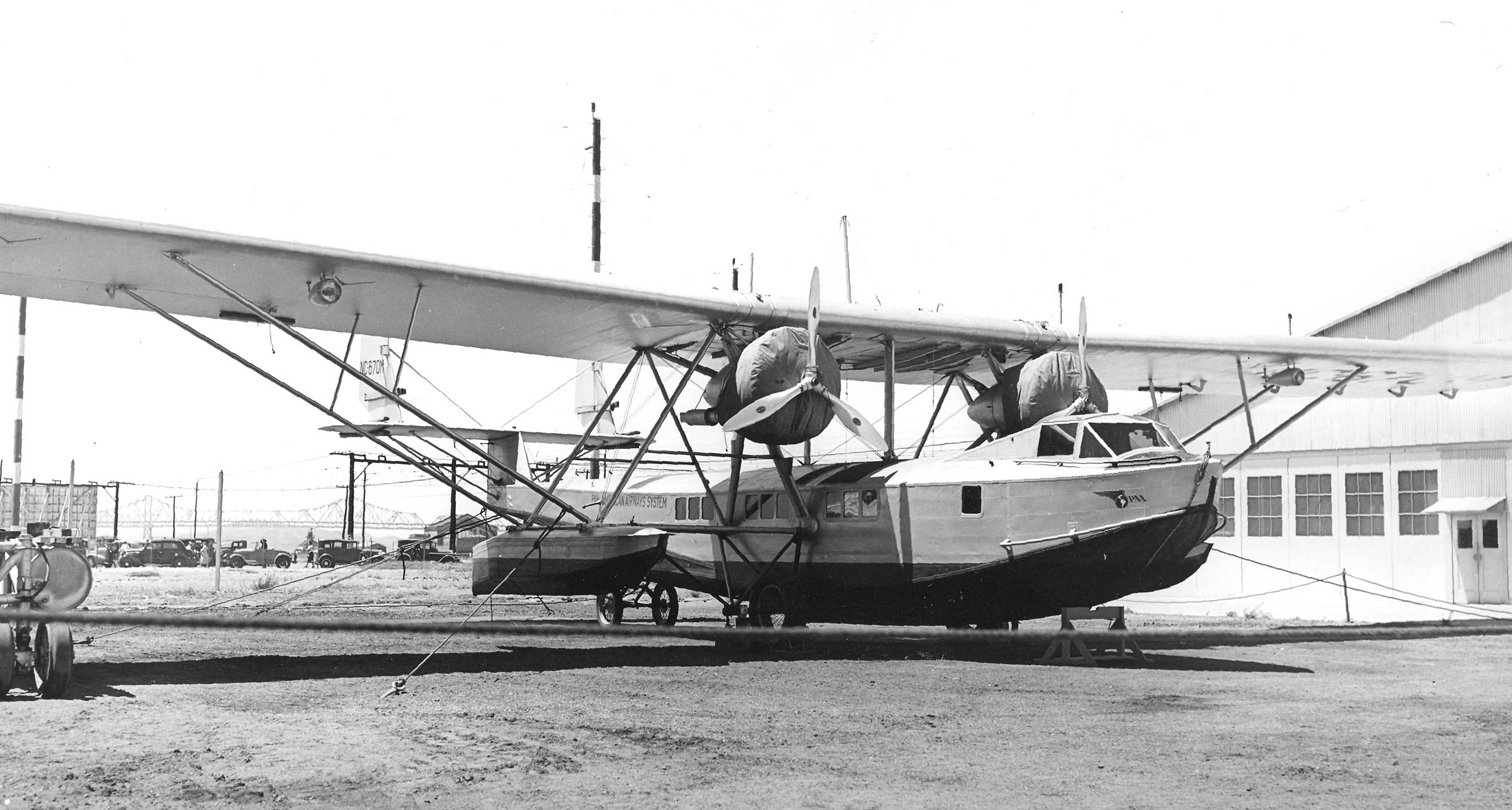
- Consolidated Commodore flying boat

General information
- Type: Commercial transport flying-boat
- National origin: United States
- Manufacturer: Consolidated Aircraft
- Primary user: Pan American Airways
- Number built: 14

History
- Introduction date: 1930
- First flight: 28 September 1929
- Variant: Consolidated P2Y

The Consolidated Commodore was an American flying boat built by Consolidated Aircraft and used for passenger travel in the 1930s, mostly in the Caribbean, operated by companies like Pan American Airways.

== History ==
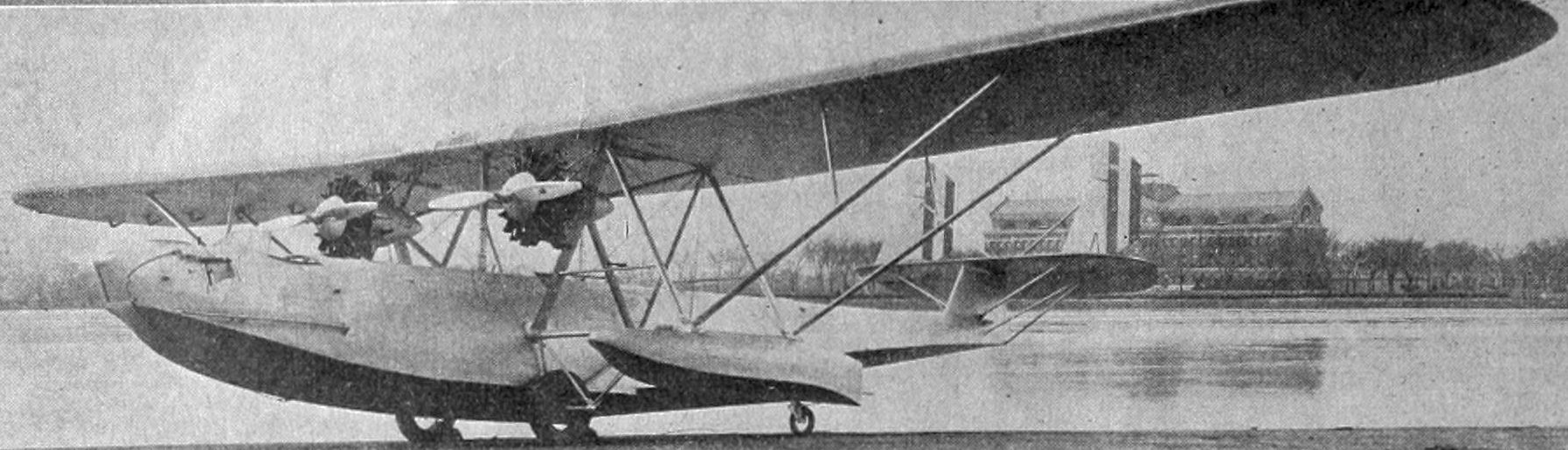
Consolidated XPY-1 photo from Aero Digest February 1929

A pioneer of the long-haul passenger aircraft industry, the Commodore "Clipper" grew out of a Navy design competition in the 1920s to create an aircraft capable of nonstop flights between the mainland of the United States and Panama, Alaska, and the Hawaiian Islands. In response to these requirements, Consolidated produced the prototype XPY-1 Admiral, designed by Isaac M. Laddon, in January 1929. Consolidated lost out on the contract to produce the airplanes for the navy to the Glenn L. Martin Company. Martin produced one prototype XP2M and nine production P3Ms. The aircraft represented a marked change from earlier patrol boat designs such as the Curtiss NC.

In response to losing the Navy contract, Consolidated offered a passenger-carrying version of the XPY-1, which became known as the Commodore. A parasol wing monoplane with all-metal hull, it could accommodate 32 passengers and a crew of three. The full complement of passengers, located in three cabins, could be carried only on relatively short route segments. For a 1000-mile flight, the boat probably could accommodate no more than 14 people including the crew. Wing and tail construction consisted of a metal frame structure covered with fabric, except for metal-covered leading edges. The Commodore had significant changes from the XPY-1. These included more powerful engines, fuselage shape and structural improvements.

== Operational service ==
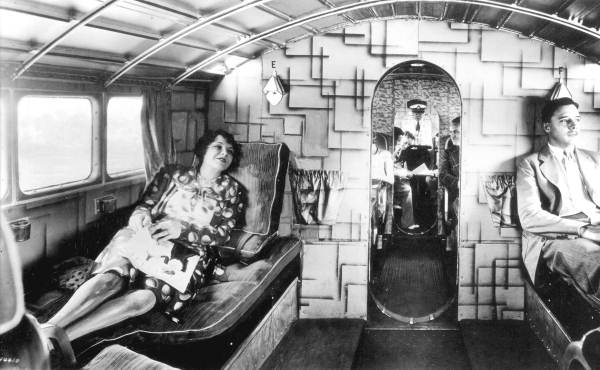
Consolidated Commodore cabin

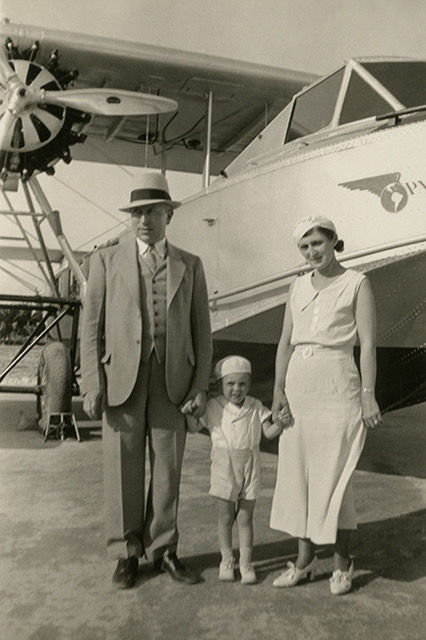
Tourists with a Consolidated Commodore flying boat used by Pan Am to fly routes in the Caribbean in the 1930s.

With a first flight in 1929, a total of 14 Commodore boats were built. Starting February 18, 1930, Commodores were flown by the New York, Rio, Buenos Aires Line from the United States to South America where routes extended as far south as Buenos Aires, a distance of 9000 miles from Miami. One testimony to the Commodore in Pan Am service was made by a Pan Am pilot, Marius Lodeesen who wrote " . . . the good old Consolidated Commodore was the most reliable, trusty air craft of the Pan American fleet during the early 1930s. . . . She was hoisted aloft by two engines. They must have been Pratt and Whitneys because they never gave any trouble. . . Waterlooping the Commodore was impossible. Making a bad landing in her was hard work. She was the loveliest boat I ever flew."

As the 1930s progressed the Commodores were gradually superseded by more efficient aircraft such as the Sikorsky S-42, Martin 130, and Boeing 314. A number of Commodores went on to serve with other operators.

The plane, in both its military and civilian configurations, may be considered a first step in the United States toward highly efficient monoplane-type patrol and transport flying boats later in the 1930s and 1940s, such as the famous Consolidated PBY Catalina of World War II.

== Surviving aircraft ==
The only known Model 16 Commodore remaining has been located in a northern Canadian lake. There is currently an ongoing project to raise and restore this airframe for display at the San Diego Air & Space Museum.

== Variants ==
Model 16
Up to 18 passengers and three crew.
Model 16-1
Up to 22 passengers and three crew.
Model 16-2
Up to 30 passengers and three crew.

== Operators ==
Argentina

- NYRBA-Argentina (Trimotor Safety Airways, Inc.)
- SANA (Sociedad Argentina de Navegación Aérea)

Bahamas

- Bahamas Airways

Brazil

- NYRBA do Brasil
- Panair do Brasil
- Brazilian Air Force (Força Aérea Brasileira)

Republic of China

- China National Aviation Corporation (CNAC)

United States

- New York, Rio, and Buenos Aires Line (NYRBA)
- Pan American Airways
- Alaska Star Airlines

== Accidents and incidents ==
- On April 16, 1935, a Pan Am Commodore, registration NC660M, burned out in a hangar fire at Miami.
- On December 14, 1940, a Sociedad Argentina de Navegación Aérea (SANA) Commodore, registration LV-RAB, crashed at Puerto Nuevo, Buenos Aires.
- On June 10, 1941, Brazilian Air Force C-12 Commodore Belem crashed at Belém, Brazil, while on an unauthorized joy ride. All 8 occupants were killed.
- On June 18, 1942, an Alaska Star Airlines Commodore, registration NC664M, burned on Takla Lake, British Columbia following a fuel spill.
- On September 24, 1943, a Pan Am Commodore, registration NC668M, crashed at Miami while on a test flight, killing one of three crew on board.
- On December 24, 1948, an Aviacion del Litoral Fluvial Argentino (ALFA) Commodore, registration LV-AAL, burned out in a hangar fire at Puerto Nuevo, Argentina.

== Specifications (Commodore 16-1) ==
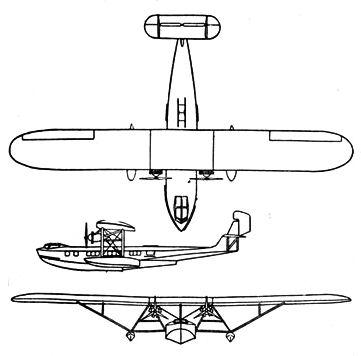
Consolidated Commodore 3-view drawing from L'Aerophile April 1932

Data from

General characteristics

- Crew: three
- Capacity: 22 passengers
- Length: 61 ft 6 in (18.75 m)
- Wingspan: 100 ft 0 in (30.48 m)
- Height: 15 ft 8 in (4.78 m)
- Wing area: 1,110 sq ft (103 m^{2})
- Empty weight: 10,500 lb (4,760 kg)
- Gross weight: 17,600 lb (7,980 kg)
- Powerplant: 2 × Pratt & Whitney R-1860 Hornet B radial piston , 575 hp (429 kW) each

Performance

- Maximum speed: 128 mph (206 km/h, 111 kn)
- Range: 1,000 mi (1,600 km, 870 nmi)
- Service ceiling: 10,000 ft (3,050 m)
- Rate of climb: 600 ft/min (3.0 m/s)

== See also ==
Related lists

- List of flying boats and floatplanes

== Sources ==
- The Illustrated Encyclopedia of Aircraft. London: Aerospace Publishing.
- Taylor, Michael J. H. (1989). Jane's Encyclopedia of Aviation. London: Studio Editions.
- World Aircraft Information Files. London: Bright Star Publishing.
- O'Neill, Ralph A. (1973). A Dream of Eagles. Boston: San Francisco Book Company/Houghton Mifflin Company. ISBN 9780395166109.
- Lodeneesen, Marius (1984). Captain Lodi Speaking. Boston ASIN: B0006EGX1U: Argonaut Press.
- Simpich, Frederick, National Geographic – January 1931, Vol. 59, No. 1, SKYPATHS THROUGH LATIN AMERICA: Flying From Our Nation's Capital Southward Over Jungles, Remote Islands, and Great Cities on an Aerial Survey of the East Coast of South America, with 78 Illustrations
