= Touquin =

- Commune
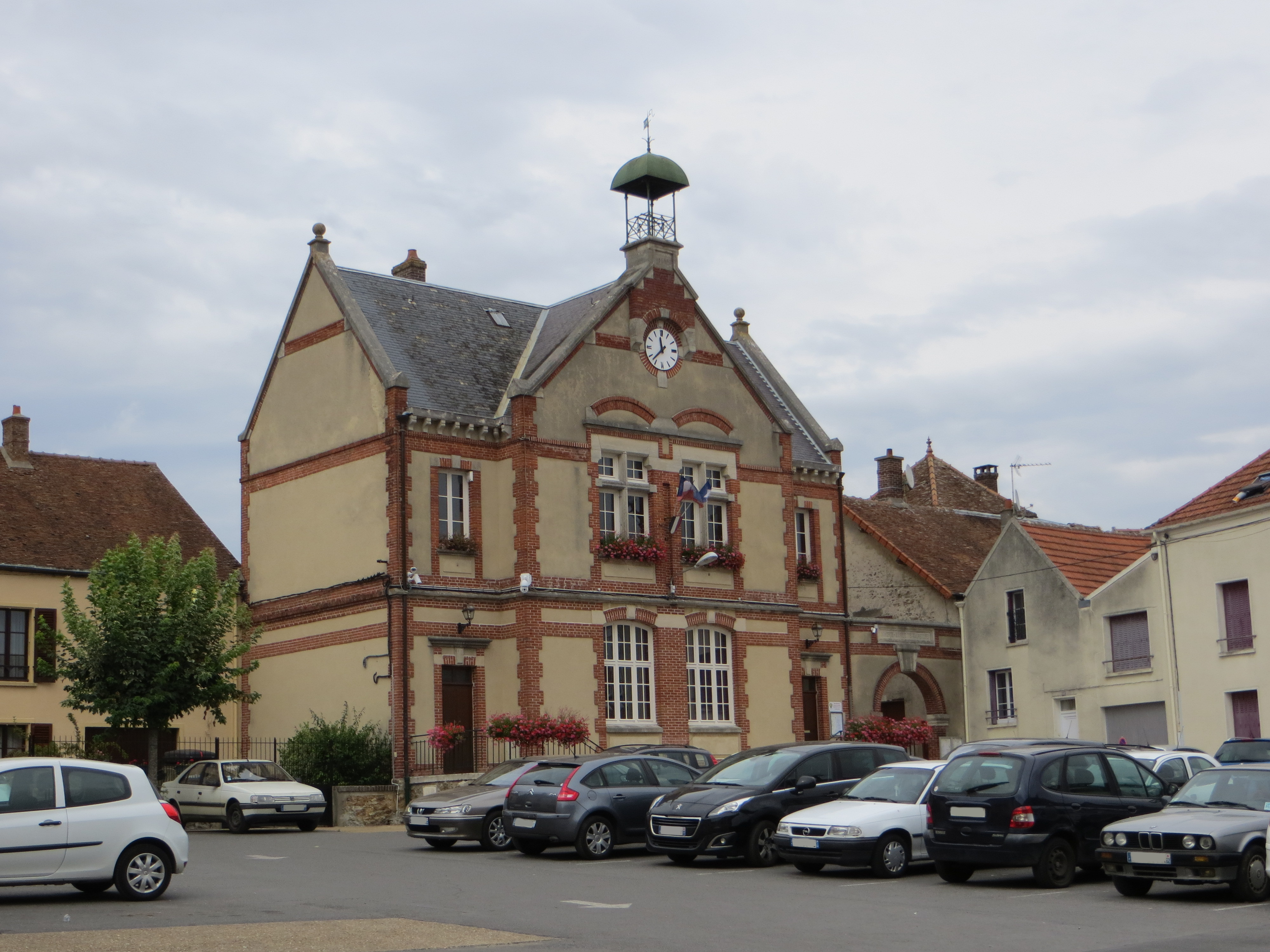
- The town hall in Touquin

- Coat of arms
- Location of Touquin
- Location within France Location within Île-de-France (region)
- Coordinates: 48°44′09″N 3°00′45″E
- Country: France
- Region: Île-de-France
- Department: Seine-et-Marne
- Arrondissement: Meaux
- Canton: Coulommiers
- Intercommunality: CA Coulommiers Pays de Brie

Government
  - Mayor (2020–2026): Sophie Chevrinais
- Area^{1}: 11.34 km^{2} (4.38 sq mi)
- Highest elevation: 131 m (430 ft)
- Lowest elevation: 89 m (292 ft)
- Population (2023): 1,253
  - Density: 110.5/km^{2} (286.2/sq mi)
- Time zone: UTC+01:00 (CET)
  - Summer (DST): UTC+02:00 (CEST)
- INSEE/Postal code: 77469 /77131
- ^{1} French Land Register data, which excludes lakes, ponds, glaciers > 1 km^{2} (0.386 sq mi or 247 acres) and river estuaries.

Touquin (French pronunciation: [tukɛ̃]) is a commune in the Seine-et-Marne department in the Île-de-France region in north-central France.

== Demographics ==
Inhabitants of Touquin are called Touquinois.

== See also ==
- Communes of the Seine-et-Marne department
- Touquin Aerodrome
