= James Andrew Healy =

American World War I flying ace (1895–1983)

- Born: 20 March 1895; Fort Leavenworth, Kansas, United States
- Died: 8 May 1983 (aged 88); Fort Worth, Texas, USA
- Military career
- Allegiance: United States
- Branch: Air Service, United States Army; United States Army Air Corps; United States Army Air Forces
- Service years: 1917 – 1936, during World War II
- Rank: Colonel
- Unit: Air Service, United States Army: 147th Aero Squadron
- Conflicts: World War I
- Awards: Distinguished Service Cross, French Croix de Guerre
- Other work: Colonel during World War II

Lieutenant (later Colonel) James Andrew Healy was a World War I flying ace credited with five victories.

== Biography ==
He was the son of Colonel Daniel Healy, one of Theodore Roosevelt's Rough Riders who was killed at San Juan Hill in the Spanish–American War, and Mrs. Mary A. Healy of Jersey City, New Jersey.

James Andrew Healy joined the Air Service, United States Army in July 1917 and was trained near Toronto, Ontario, Canada by the Royal Flying Corps. After flight training, he deployed to France and was assigned to the 147th Aero Squadron in 1918. Flying the SPAD XIII he scored five confirmed victories and became the fourth highest scoring ace in his squadron.

Post-war Healy remained in the air corps and was technical advisor on William Wellman's 1927 movie, Wings. Healy retired on a disability with the rank of Major in 1936.

He returned to service in World War II and was promoted to Colonel.

== See also ==
- List of World War I flying aces from the United States
