= Touquin Aerodrome =

Temporary aerodrome in France

- Part of American Expeditionary Forces (AEF)
- Located near: Touquin, France

Site information
- Type: Combat Airfield
- Controlled by: Air Service, United States Army
- Condition: Agricultural area

Location
- Coordinates: 48°43′43″N 002°59′17″E

Site history
- Built: 1918
- In use: 1918–1919
- Battles/wars: World War I

Garrison information
- Garrison: 1st Pursuit Group; United States First Army Air Service

Touquin Aerodrome was a temporary World War I airfield in France, used briefly in June–July 1918 by French escadrilles and units of the Air Service, United States Army, and again by the French from February to May 1919. It was located in the Île-de-France region, approximately 32 miles (51 km) east of Paris.

== Overview ==
As with Saints, Touquin airfield was hastily built during the Allied struggle to stop the (eventually last) German drive towards Paris across the river Marne. The first French unit arrived on 20 June 1918, followed by two other "escadrilles", then by the American 1st Pursuit Group, Air Service, United States Army on 28 June, with HQ and four squadrons. As it was summer, the field saw probably no more than a few tents, without any hangar to shelter the aircraft. All French units were gone by the 7 July, and the 1st Pursuit Group left for Saints on next 9 July.

On 25 February 1919, two French escadrilles arrived at the airfield, the last one leaving on 17 May, before the fields returned definitely to agricultural use. Today it is a series of cultivated fields located south of Pezarches. The airfield was located to the south of the Départmental 231 (D231), with no indications of its wartime use.

== Known units assigned ==
- Headquarters, 1st Pursuit Group, 28 June – 9 July 1918
- 27th Aero Squadron (Pursuit) 28 June – 9 July 1918
- 95th Aero Squadron (Pursuit) 28 June – 9 July 1918
- 147th Aero Squadron (Pursuit) 28 June – 9 July 1918
- 94th Aero Squadron (Pursuit) 30 June – 9 July 1918

== See also ==
- List of Air Service American Expeditionary Force aerodromes in France
