= Francis May Simonds =

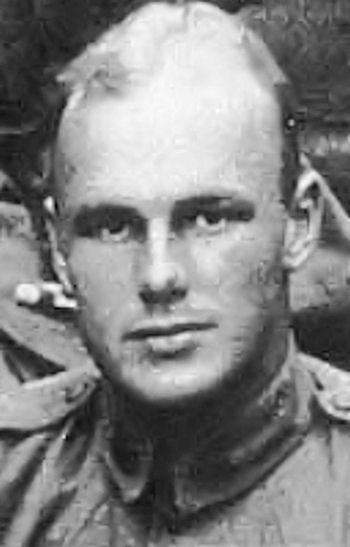
- Francis May Simonds, 1918
- Born: 17 October 1894; Flushing, New York, USA
- Died: 10 July 1961 (aged 66); Naples, Florida
- Military career
- Allegiance: United States
- Branch: Air Service, United States Army
- Rank: Lieutenant
- Unit: 147th Aero Squadron
- Conflicts: World War I
- Awards: French Croix de Guerre

Lieutenant Francis May Simonds (17 October 1894 – 10 July 1961) was an American World War I flying ace credited with five aerial victories.

== Biography ==
Captain of the football team and a member of the varsity eight in his junior year, Francis May Simonds graduated from Columbia University in 1916. Simonds was assigned to the 147th Aero Squadron on 23 February 1918. He scored five aerial victories from July through October 1918.

== See also ==
- List of World War I flying aces from the United States

== Bibliography ==
- American Aces of World War I. Norman Franks, Harry Dempsey. Osprey Publishing, 2001. ISBN 1-84176-375-6, ISBN 978-1-84176-375-0.
