= 435th Bombardment Squadron =

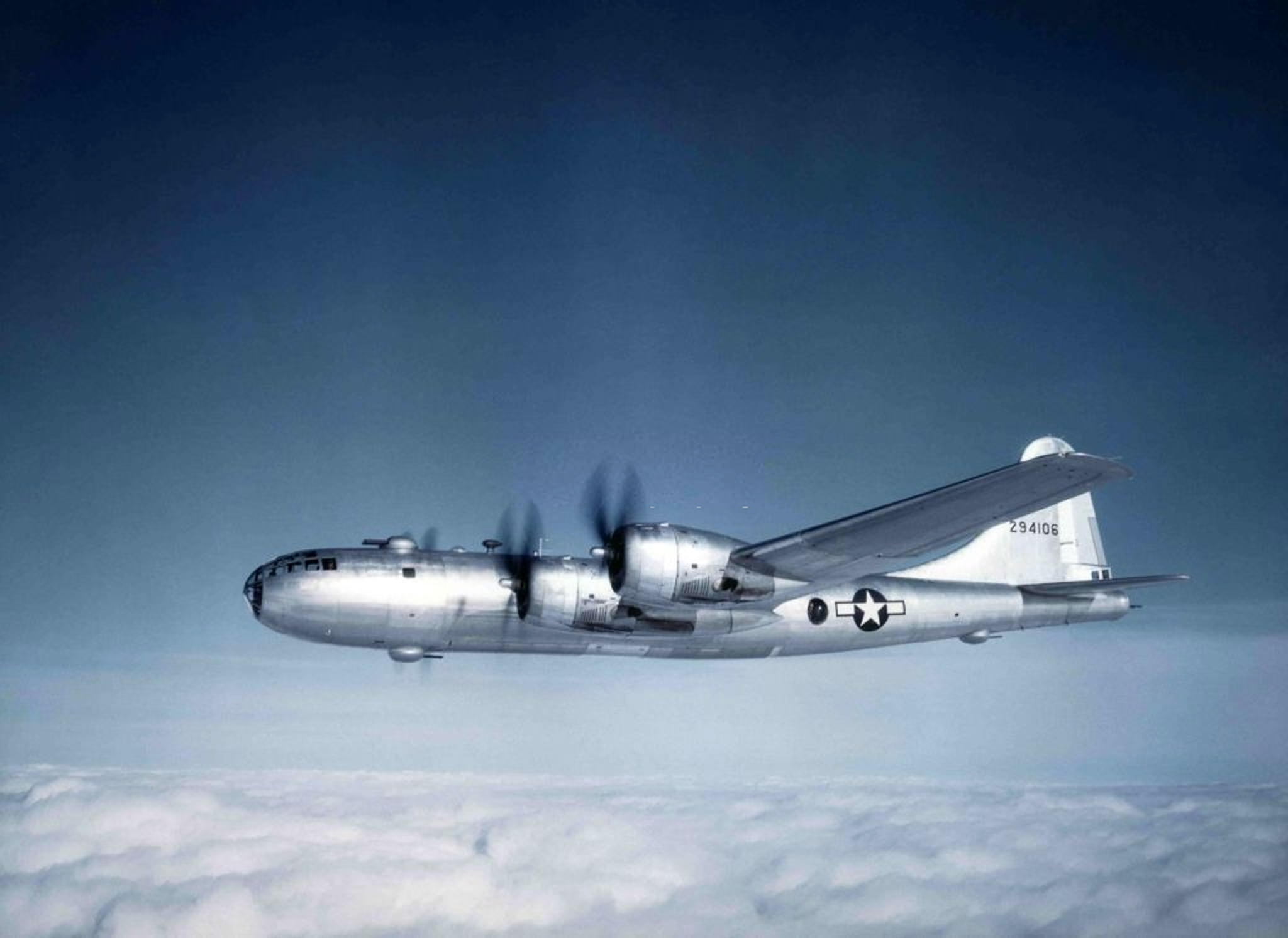
- B-29 Superfortress as flown by the squadron
- Active: 1942–1944; 1944; 1944–1946
- Country: United States
- Branch: United States Air Force
- Role: Heavy bomber
- Nickname: Kangaroo Squadron
- Engagements: Southwest Pacific Theater; Pacific Ocean Theater
- Decorations: Distinguished Unit Citation; Philippine Presidential Unit Citation

Insignia
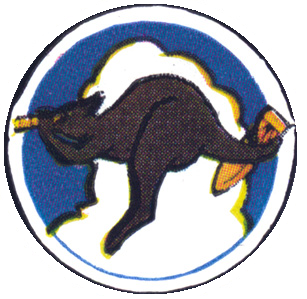
- 435th Bombardment Squadron emblem (Note: Approved 6 May 1943. Description: On a blue disc, border white, a kangaroo leaping proper, in front of a large white cloud formation, peering through a telescope grasped in the forelegs and holding a large gold aerial bomb in a loop of the tail.)

The 435th Bombardment Squadron, also known as the "Kangaroo" Squadron, is an inactive United States Air Force unit. It was formed in Australia in March 1942 as the 40th Reconnaissance Squadron and participated in combat in the Southwest Pacific Theater until November, when it was withdrawn from combat and returned to the United States, where it acted as a Replacement Training Unit until October 1943, when its personnel and equipment were withdrawn.

The squadron was activated in April 1944 as a Boeing B-29 Superfortress unit, but was inactivated six weeks later, when B-29 groups reorganized from four to three squadrons. It activated again later that summer, and trained with B-29s until June 1945, when it deployed to Kadena Air Base, Okinawa, just before V-J Day. It remained on Okinawa until it was inactivated on 28 May 1946.

== History ==
=== Background ===
In the fall of 1941, the 19th Bombardment Group began moving to reinforce the Philippine Department Air Force. By the time of the Attack on Clark Field and the Attack on Pearl Harbor in December, group headquarters and its assigned 28th and 93d Bombardment Squadrons and attached 14th Bombardment Squadron were located in the Philippines. Its 32nd Bombardment Squadron had begun deploying from the Pacific coast. However, its 38th Reconnaissance Squadron, which arrived at Hickam Field, Hawaii as it was under attack, was used to reinforce the Hawaiian Islands. The reformed 38th Squadron remained in the United States. In mid-March 1942, the 38th was attached to the 303d Bombardment Group and 5th Air Force was authorized to organize the 40th Reconnaissance Squadron in its place.

=== Combat in the Southwest Pacific ===
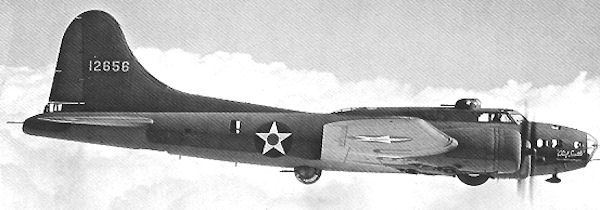
Squadron B-17E Flying Fortress (Note: Aircraft is Boeing B-17E Flying Fortress, serial 41-2656, Chief Seattle It was assigned to the squadron on 29 May 1942. It was Lost over Buna, Papua New Guinea, 14 August 1942 on a reconnaissance mission, its crew was missing in action.)

The 40th was organized at RAAF Base Townsville, Australia in March 1942 combining personnel and equipment already in theater and new arrivals. It initially equipped with Boeing B-17 Flying Fortress and Consolidated LB-30 Liberator heavy bombers. Almost immediately upon formation, the squadron was called upon to provide three of its B-17s to evacuate General Douglas MacArthur and Philippines President Manuel Quezon from Del Monte Field in the Philippine Islands.

The following month the squadron was redesignated the 435th Bombardment Squadron. In May, the squadron participated in the Battle of the Coral Sea, staging through Port Moresby, New Guinea and attacking the Japanese fleet. A report from a B-17 of the squadron of sighting an aircraft carrier convinced American naval commanders that fleet carriers were accompanying the Japanese invasion force.

It raided enemy transportation and communications targets and Japanese ground forces during th invasion of Papua New Guinea. It was awarded a Distinguished Unit Citation for bombing airdromes, ground installations and shipping near New Britain and Rabaul from 7 to 12 August 1942. The squadron was withdrawn from combat in November 1942 and returned to the United States on paper.

=== Training unit ===
The squadron reorganized at Pyote Army Air Base, Texas in January 1943 and began operations as a B-17 Replacement Training Unit in February. Replacement training units were oversized units which trained aircrews prior to their deployment to combat theaters. It stopped its training activities in October 1943, when its personnel were withdrawn. However it remained active as a paper unit until 1 April 1944, when it was inactivated in a general reorganization by the Army Air Forces of its training activities in the United States.

=== Return to the Pacific with B-29s ===
The squadron was reactivated the same day at Great Bend Army Air Field, Kansas as a Boeing B-29 Superfortress squadron. However, B-29 groups were reorganized from four squadrons of 7 airplanes into three squadrons of 10 planes each, and the squadron was inactivated on 10 May 1944.

New B-29 groups were being formed, and the squadron was again activated at Dalhart Army Air Field, Texas on 7 July 1944, and assigned to the 333d Bombardment Group. The 333d Group was a former heavy bomber training unit that had been inactivated in the spring of 1944. The squadron trained with Superfortresses until June 1945, when it departed for the Pacific to become an element of Eighth Air Force, which was organizing on Okinawa as a second very heavy bomber air force in the Pacific. However, the squadron did not arrive at its combat station, Kadena Airfield, until it was too late to participate in combat. The squadron flew show-of-force missions and its aircraft helped evacuate prisoners of war from Japan to airfields in the Philippines. The unit was inactivated on 28 May 1946.

== Lineage ==
- Formed as the 40th Reconnaissance Squadron on 14 March 1942 by authority of the War Department but apparently without formal constitution and activation

Redesignated 435th Bombardment Squadron (Heavy) on 22 April 1942
Inactivated on 1 April 1944

- Redesignated 435th Bombardment Squadron, Very Heavy and activated on 1 April 1944

Inactivated on 10 May 1944

- Activated on 7 July 1944

Inactivated on 28 May 1946

=== Assignments ===
- 19th Bombardment Group, 14 March 1942 – 1 April 1944 (attached to Allied Air Forces, c. 17 July – c. 24 September 1942)
- 19th Bombardment Group, 1 April – 10 May 1944
- 333d Bombardment Group, 7 July 1944 – 28 May 1946

=== Stations ===
- RAAF Base Townsville, Australia, 14 March – c. 15 November 1942
- Pocatello Army Air Field, Idaho, c. 30 December 1942
- Pyote Army Air Base, Texas, 5 January 1943 – 1 April 1944
- Great Bend Army Air Field, Kansas, 1 April – 10 May 1944
- Dalhart Army Air Field, Texas, 7 July 1944
- Great Bend Army Air Field, Kansas, 10 December 1944 – 19 June 1945
- Kadena Airfield, Okinawa, 5 August 1945 – 28 May 1946

=== Aircraft ===
- Consolidated LB-30 Liberator, 1942
- Boeing B-17 Flying Fortress, 1942–1944
- Boeing B-29 Superfortress 1944–1946

=== Awards and campaigns ===
Award streamer	Award	Dates	Notes
	Distinguished Unit Citation	7–12 August 1942	New Britain 435th Bombardment Squadron
	Distinguished Unit Citation	23 July – c. 13 November 1942	Papua 435th Bombardment Squadron
	Distinguished Unit Citation	10 September – 10 October 1942	New Guinea, New Britain, New Ireland and Solomon Islands 435th Bombardment Squadron
	Philippine Presidential Unit Citation	14 March 1942 – 10 May 1942	435th Bombardment Squadron

Campaign Streamer	Campaign	Dates	Notes
	Philippine Islands	14 March 1942–10 May 1942	40th Reconnaissance Squadron (later 435th Bombardment Squadron)
	East Indies	14 March 1942–22 July 1942	40th Reconnaissance Squadron (later 435th Bombardment Squadron)
	Guadalcanal	7 August 1942–c. 15 November 1942	435th Bombardment Squadron
	Papua	23 July 1942–c. 15 November 1942	435th Bombardment Squadron
	American Theater without inscription	c. 30 December 1942–19 June 1945	435th Bombardment Squadron

== See also ==
- United States Army Air Forces in Australia
- B-17 Flying Fortress units of the United States Army Air Forces
- List of B-29 Superfortress operators

== Notes ==
Explanatory notes

Citations

=== Bibliography ===
- Craven, Wesley F; Cate, James L, eds. (1953). The Army Air Forces in World War II (PDF). Vol. V, The Pacific: Matterhorn to Nagasaki. Chicago, IL: University of Chicago Press. LCCN 48003657. OCLC 704158.

Cate, James L. (1953). "The Twentieth Air Force and Matterhorn, Chapter 5, Exit Matterhorn". In Craven, Wesley F; Cate, James L (eds.). The Army Air Forces in World War II (PDF). Vol. V, The Pacific: Matterhorn to Nagasaki. Chicago, IL: University of Chicago Press. LCCN 48003657. OCLC 704158.

- Craven, Wesley F; Cate, James L, eds. (1955). "Introduction". The Army Air Forces in World War II. Vol. VI, Men & Planes. Chicago, IL: University of Chicago Press. p. xxxvi. LCCN 48003657.
- D'Albas, Andrieu (1965). Death of a Navy: Japanese Naval Action in World War II. New York, NY: Devin-Adair Co. ASIN B0006AUP2C. ISBN 0-8159-5302-X.
- Edmonds, Walter D. (1992) [1951]. They Fought With What They Had: The Story of the Army Air Forces in the Southwest Pacific 1941-1942 (PDF) (reprint ed.). Washington, DC: Center for Air Force History. Archived from the original (PDF) on 8 February 2018.
- Goss, William A. (1955). "The Organization and its Responsibilities, Chapter 2 The AAF" (PDF). In Craven, Wesley F.; Cate, James L. (eds.). The Army Air Forces in World War II. Vol. VI, Men & Planes. Chicago, IL: University of Chicago Press. LCCN 48003657. OCLC 704158.
- Maurer, Maurer, ed. (1983) [1961]. Air Force Combat Units of World War II (PDF) (reprint ed.). Washington, DC: Office of Air Force History. ISBN 0-912799-02-1. LCCN 61060979. Archived from the original (PDF) on 20 December 2016.
- Maurer, Maurer, ed. (1982) [1969]. Combat Squadrons of the Air Force, World War II (PDF) (reprint ed.). Washington, DC: Office of Air Force History. ISBN 0-405-12194-6. LCCN 70605402. OCLC 72556. Archived from the original (PDF) on 20 December 2016.
