= Philippine Department Air Force (United States) =

The Philippine Department Air Force was a military formation of the United States Army Air Forces.

The command was officially established on 6 May 1941 as the Philippine Department Air Force at Nichols Field, Luzon, Philippines.

== Origins ==
The United States Army Philippine Department was established on 11 January 1911 in the Unincorporated Philippine Territory. Fifth Air Force traces its roots in the Philippines to the activation of the Air Office of the Philippine Department in March 1912.

In August 1907, Brigadier General James Allen, the United States Army's Chief Signal Officer, established the Aeronautical Division as the nation's air service and oversaw the introduction of powered heavier-than-air flight as a military application. Four years later Allen recommended the establishment of an air station in the Philippines. Military aviation began there on 12 March 1912, when 1st Lt. Frank P. Lahm of the 7th Cavalry, detailed to the Division, opened the Philippine Air School on the polo field of Fort William McKinley, using a single Wright B airplane to train pilots. Ultimately attriting four of the Army's first 18 airplanes, aviation went temporarily out of business when the last plane crashed into Corregidor's San Jose Bay on 12 January 1915.

The First Company, 2d Aero Squadron, was activated at Fort William McKinley, Luzon, on 3 February 1916. This unit was a training school, operating Martin S Hydro seaplanes, first produced in the United States in 1915. The unit operated under the Air Office until 15 October 1917, when it was inactivated when the early aviators returned to the United States as a result of the American entry into World War I. In 1917 outside Fort Stotsenburg, Luzon, construction began on a half-mile long dirt runway, hangars and other support facilities to bring the local army units into the air age. Construction was completed in 1919. A permanent Army Air Service presence in the Philippines began in December 1919 with the activation of the 3d Aero Squadron at the facility. The unit was initially equipped with de Havilland DH-4 medium bombers. The next year it moved to the new Clark Field on 15 October 1920 where, combined with some support units, the 1st Observation Group was formed.

Clark Field became the Army Air Corps headquarters overseas, and was the only American air base west of Hawaii. In 1923 the Air Service withdrew all of the DH-4s, along with Liberty motors and spare parts, previously sent to the Philippines to be stored as a reserve, came back to the United States for conversion to DH-4Bs. When workmen at Rockwell Field outside San Diego, California opened one of the crates, they found a motor with a remarkable history. Built in Detroit, it went to France, back to the United States, then to the Philippines, and now to Rockwell-without ever being used.

=== 4th Composite Group ===
In 1922, a second unit, the 28th Bombardment Squadron, was activated at Clark Field with DH-4s. in 1923, the 3d Aero Squadron was re designated the 3d Pursuit Squadron and received new Boeing Thomas-Morse MB-3 fighters. With that, the 1st Observation Group at Clark was re-designated as the 4th Observation; and later the 4th Composite Group. The 4th Composite would be the mainstay of United States air power in the Philippines until 1941, under the nominal command of the Air Officer of the Philippine Department.

In addition to Clark Field, additional airfields at Kindley Field on Corregidor in Manila Bay (Opened September 1922), and one at Camp Nichols (Nichols Field, 1920) were constructed. The 3d Pursuit and 28th Bombardment moved from field to field during the 1920s, with the 4th Composite Group having its headquarters at Nichols until World War II. Over time, various aircraft were sent to the Philippines, the Martin NBS-1 night bomber in 1924 (28th BS); Boeing PW-9 fighters in 1926 (3d PS); Keystone LB-5 bombers in 1929 (28th BS).

Beginning in 1930, the 3d Pursuit Squadron received Boeing P-12E fighters; the 28th Bombardment Squadron, receiving Keystone B-3A bombers in 1931. The 3d Pursuit squadron also received some Douglas O-2 and Thomas-Morse O-19 observation aircraft. These would be the last new aircraft received in the Philippines until 1937 due to funding shortages caused by the Great Depression.

In 1935, the Philippine Army Air Corps was established as part of the gradual decision by the United States to establish the Philippines as an independent nation. Its Army counterpart, the Philippine Scouts, had been established in 1901. In 1937, the 4th Composite Group began receiving Boeing P-26 Peashooter fighters and Martin B-10 bombers, its older aircraft being transferred to the Philippine AAC. By 1940, the corps had around 40 aircraft and 100 pilots.

In 1940 as part of the overall mobilization of the Army Air Forces and in response to the increase of tensions between the United States and the Japanese Empire, two additional pursuit squadrons were transferred from the United States to the 4th Composite Group at Nichols Field:

- 20th Pursuit Squadron, 18 November 1940 (Seversky P-35)
- 17th Pursuit Squadron, 5 December 1940 (Seversky P-35)

In addition, additional obsolete Boeing P-26 Peashooters were sent from the United States. In January 1941, however, the three pursuit squadrons began receiving a few Seversky P-35As. These little Severskys had originally been consigned to Sweden, but on last-minute orders from Washington the shipment was diverted to the Philippines. Because the plane had been designed for the Swedish Air Force they were considerably more powerfully armed than the U.S. model, which carried only two .30-caliber machine guns firing through the propeller. Before this, their standard equipment had been obsolete Boeing P-26 Peashooters. The pilots of the 17th and 20th Squadrons, arriving from the States in November 1940, had been surprised, to put it mildly, when they found themselves back in the obsolete type of plane from which they had graduated a year before at Selfridge Field, Michigan. In fact, when they scratched the paint off a few of these antique numbers, they found some of the identical aircraft that they had trained in back in the States.

"In spite of suggestions by radical Air Force officers, no guns were installed in the wings of our planes; but the Swedes, being practical fellows, had ordered an extra .50-caliber gun in each wing. Some difficulties occurred in assembling the planes and in pilots' transition to them, for they were naturally equipped with Swedish instrumentation and no English version of technical orders was available. However, by the end of May the transition had been successfully accomplished and the 3d, 17th and 20th pursuit squadrons were equipped, if not with actual first-line planes, at least with machines that did not threaten to come apart in the fliers' hands."

== Philippine Department Air Force ==
The Philippine Department Air Force was formed on 6 May 1941 as the War Department hastily reversed course and attempted to upgrade its air defenses in the Philippines. The general officer requested by Philippine Department head Maj. Gen. George Grunert arrived on 4 May in the person of Brig. Gen. Henry B. Clagett , who had just completed a three-week air defense course taught at Mitchel Field, New York, to familiarize him with the concepts of integrating Signal Corps radars, radio communications, and interceptor forces. Army Chief of Staff George C. Marshall had also given Clagett a top-secret mission to go to China in mid-May for a month of observation and assessment of Japanese tactics.

On 27 July 1941, General Douglas MacArthur, who had been recalled to active duty, was placed in command of the United States Army Forces in the Far East (USAFFE). For the Air Forces the new command involved further shifts in organization, and on 5 August the Philippine Department which had controlled air units since March 1912 was redesignated Air Forces, USAFFE.

=== Operating squadrons and reinforcements ===
In the meantime, though, the squadrons suffered from a shortage of pilots. The 17th and 20th Pursuit Squadrons, which had arrived with a full complement, were continually losing men through transfers to other organizations more seriously understaffed. Pilot reinforcements began to come in February, but not until July were the three pursuit squadrons brought back to strength, when pilots fresh out of training school landed at Manila. As these men all required further training, a unit for that purpose had to be set up at Clark Field. By then the 17th and 20th had lost about 75 percent of their original personnel, and ultimately the 17th went into the war with only five of the pilots who had come out with the unit and 35 younger pilots who had received their training in the Philippines for periods varying from one to ten months.

Throughout the second half of 1941, additional units were deployed to the Philippines, reinforcing the Philippine Department Air Force. These reinforcements aimed to deter Japanese aggression. They were sent in response to the proposal by Chief of the Army Air Forces, Major General Henry H. Arnold, who in July 1941 proposed sending four heavy bombardment groups (340 aircraft) and two pursuit squadrons (260 aircraft) to the Philippines.

An increasing stream of reinforcements now began to arrive from the United States. By October, it had become necessary to move one of the fighter squadrons out of Clark Field to make room for the expected arrival of the 19th Bombardment Group. The 17th Pursuit Squadron was therefore transferred to its old base at Nichols Field, and shortly afterward, on 26 October, the 3d Pursuit Squadron took its place at the new Iba Airfield and began gunnery training. Work on the landing strips at Nichols Field had not been completed, and their poor condition resulted in a high accident rate for the 17th Squadron. However, these two squadrons, and the 20th, which stayed at Clark Field, had now finally reached the fields on which they were still based when the news of the Pearl Harbor Attack came, near dawn of 8 December.

With the arrival of the 19th Bombardment Group, the 4th Composite Group would become an unwieldy organization. On 26 September, therefore, the 24th Pursuit Group was created, including the three squadrons, now at the three separate fields, as well as Headquarters and a Headquarters Squadron, which were based at Clark Field. On 16 November 1941, the 19th Bombardment Group arrived from the United States at Clark Field and the 4th Composite group was disbanded. On 20 November, two more squadrons, the 21st Pursuit Squadron and the 34th Pursuit Squadron, both from the 35th Pursuit Group, arrived from the States and were attached to the 24th Pursuit Group pending the arrival of the rest of the 35th group, which of course never came. These two squadrons were at only half strength. They also arrived without their planes, for they expected to find new ships ready when they disembarked from San Francisco.

=== Airfields ===
The Manila civilian Nielson Airport was taken over in October 1941 and became Nielson Field, giving the Air Force a third operational airfield on Luzon. Additional fields were constructed at Iba, Ternate, and Del Monte on Mindanao. Clark Field, 60 miles north of Manila, was the only first-class field—it was, as a matter of fact, the only first-class field in the Philippines, for Del Monte had not yet been developed. Del Monte had no hard runways, but was entirely surfaced with turf.

Nielson Field, at which the Air Headquarters was to be located, lay just south of Manila, between the city and Fort McKinley. It was classed as a fighter field, but had few facilities and was little used by combat planes then or later. Iba Field, on the Zambales coast well north of Subic Bay, had been a training camp for the Philippine Constabulary. It was to be used for a few short months by the Air Force as a gunnery training field, but it lacked facilities for extended operations.

This left Nichols Field as the principal fighter field. It was about six miles south of the heart of Manila and near the shore of Manila Bay, from which it was divided by the constricted, ramshackle barrio of Baclaran and a curve of the Parañaque River. The only approach to the field was down the main road that doubled as Baclaran's village street and then sharp left along a narrow lane that crossed the Parañaque River on a flimsy two-lane bridge. Except by air, there was no other access and a single bomb, rightly placed, could entirely isolate the airdrome.

The PDAF was succeeded by the Far East Air Force in November 1941.
