= Lawrence S. Churchill =

U.S. Army Air Corps Colonel

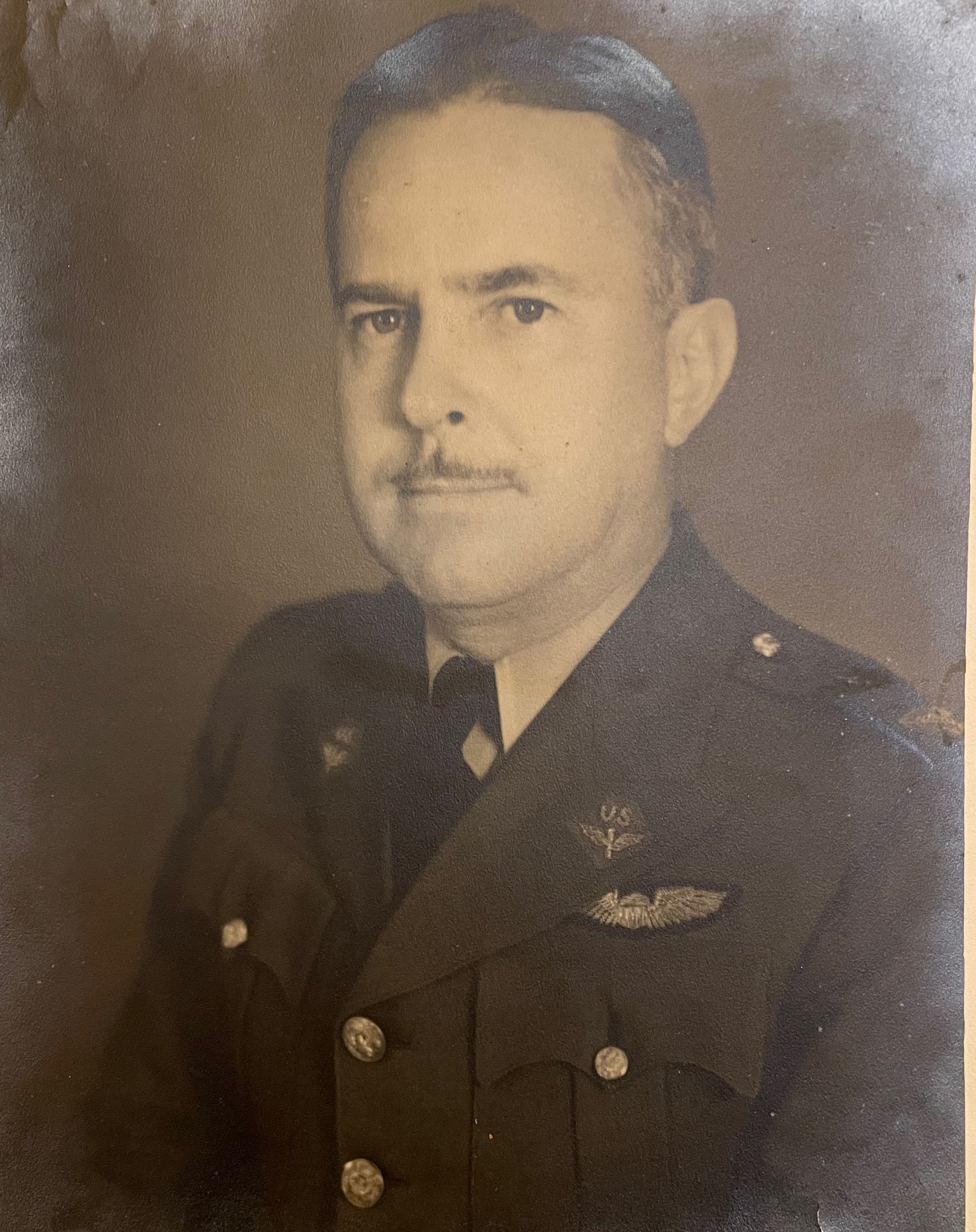
L. S. Churchill, 1935, while commander of Langley Field, Virginia,

Lawrence S. Churchill was a colonel in United States Army Air Corps. He was a fighter pilot during World War I, and was commander of the Far East Air Service Command, based in the Philippines during World War II. He was taken captive by the Japanese during their invasion of the Philippines, forced to march in the Death March of Bataan, and was imprisoned in a POW camp in Manchuria. He was later liberated at the conclusion of the war and returned to the United States and retired.

== Biography ==
Lawrence Sprague Churchill was born June 10, 1890, in Ogdensburg, New York, son of John C. Churchill and Mary B. Churchill. His grandfather was the Honorable John Charles Churchill. He attended public school in Oswego, New York, Staunton Military Academy, and three years at Union College. He trained at the Aviation School, San Diego, and General Staff College 1918. Churchill later graduated from the Army Industrial College in 1933.

He died on July 21, 1972. He was buried at the Myrtle Hill Cemetery Rome, Floyd County, Georgia on July 27, 1972, alongside his wife, Bessie Moore Churchill.

== Family Life ==
The Churchill family arrives in Honolulu on their way to Manila. From left to right: Lawrence S., Jr. (age 17), Mrs. Churchill; Col. Churchill; John C., III (age 14).

Col. Churchill married Bessie Ann Moore on January 17, 1920. They had two sons, Lawrence S., Jr., and John C., III.

== Military service ==
Churchill was commissioned as a second lieutenant on April 24, 1912. He was a member of the 1st Corp Observation Group, Corps Air Service Commander, 8th Army Corps. Commissioned Captain, May 1917, then Major July 1920. Commanding Officer at Souther Field, Georgia, Nov. 1919 - 1922. America’s Air Intermediate Depot, Americus, Georgia, 1922. Commander of Langley Field, Virginia, 1937. Commander of Middletown, Pennsylvania, Air Field. Commander, Commander Nichols Fields, Philippines.

=== Service during World War I ===
In 1917, Lieutenant Colonel Churchill was appointed Assistant Chief of Air Services, in the Zone of Advance, at Chaumont, France. He was under the command of General John J Pershing. The air service of the American Expeditionary Forces formed under the General Organization project, “a comprehensive plan for the American Expeditionary forces as a whole”

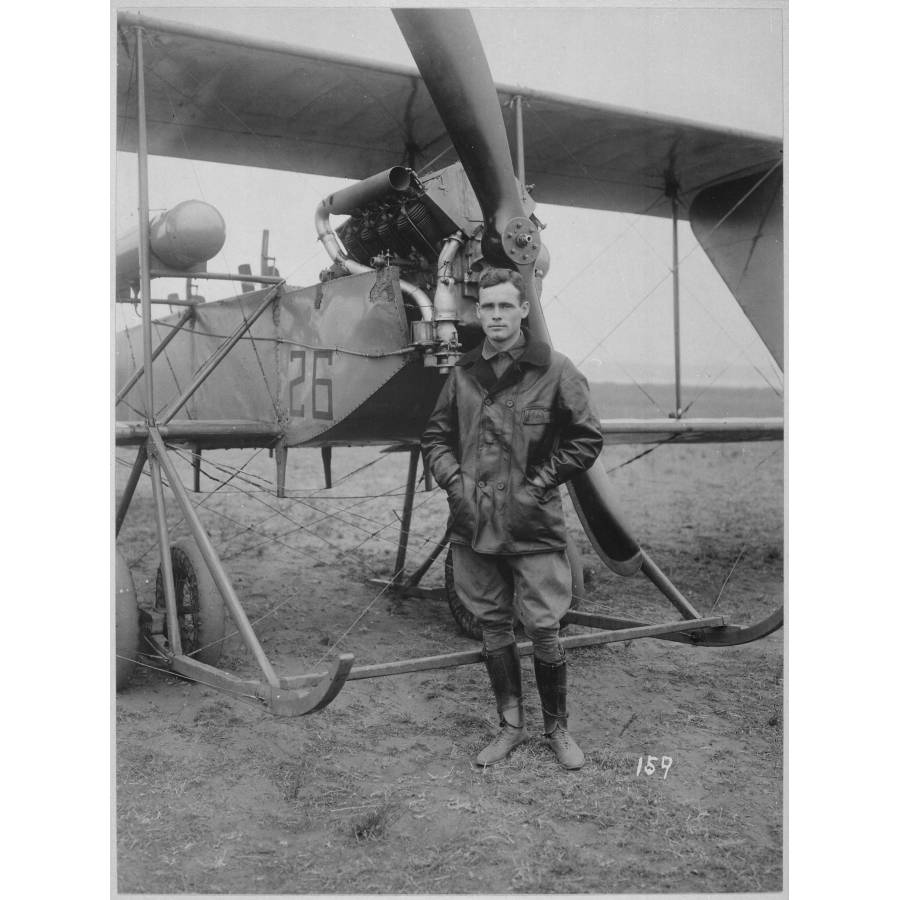
2nd Lieutenant Lawrence S. Churchill, by his plane, at Rockwell Field, San Diego, 1915.

=== Service during World War II ===
At the outbreak of the war with Japan, Col. Churchill was commander of the Far East Air Service Command, in charge of the fighter planes based at Nichols Field, 1941. When the Japanese army invaded the Philippines, all air force units were ordered to move to Bataan. Colonel Churchill was informed by General Brereton "that the Air Force was to move and that there were no written orders." During an aerial bombing raid by the Japanese, December 31, 1941, Col. Churchill gathered senior officers, and they directed military traffic on the roads, and saved many lives and much materiel. He was subsequently awarded a Silver Star for this heroism.

When the Japanese invaded, plans were made to evacuate the senior officers of FEAF to Australia, and Col. Churchill was the most senior air force officer there. But the B17 aircraft intended for that evacuation did not arrive. "The sixty year old Churchill, his spirit knocked out by dysentery, told the others they might as well give up." (He was actually only 51 years old at the time.) Ultimately, Col. Churchill was captured, was sent to a POW camp in Manchuria. He was liberated by Soviet troops in late 1945.

Col. Churchill was awarded the Legion of Merit medal "...for exceptionally meritorious conduct in the performance of outstanding service during the periods...8 December 1941 through March 1942.” He retired from active duty on April 30, 1947 after thirty-five years of service and was placed on the United States Air Force retired list.
