= 20th Fighter Squadron =

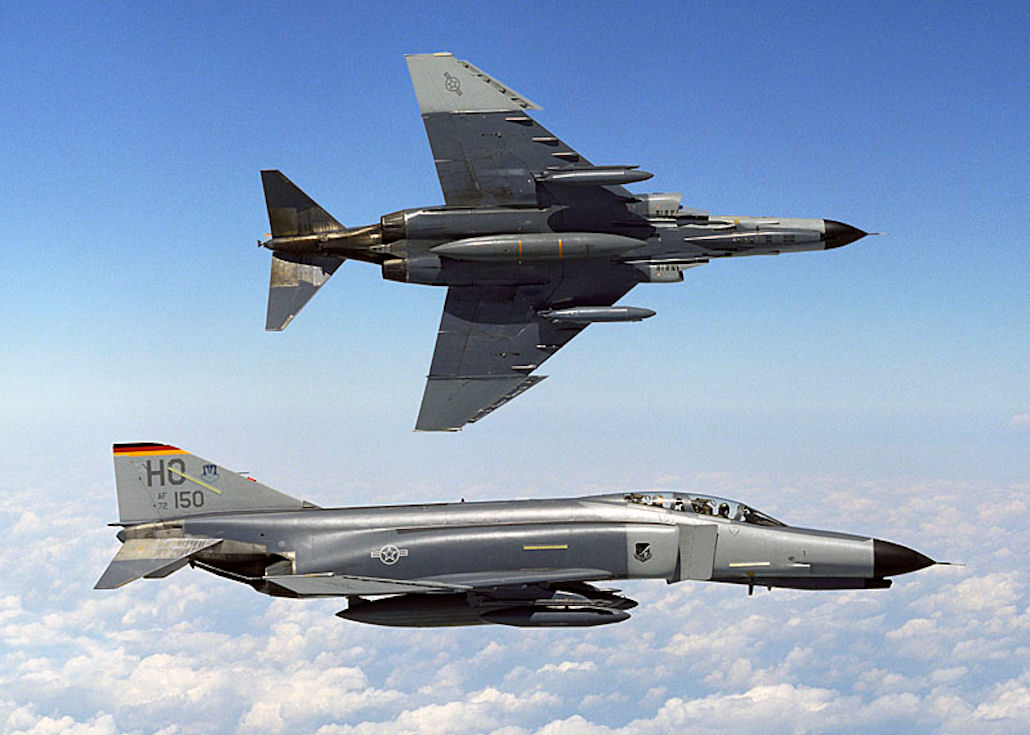
- 20th Fighter Squadron Luftwaffe F-4Fs over the skies of Holloman AFB (Note: Aircraft in foreground is McDonnell Douglas F-4F Phantom serial 72-1150)
- Active: 1940–1946, 1972–1992, 1993–2004
- Country: United States
- Branch: United States Air Force
- Role: Fighter
- Nickname: Silver Lobos
- Engagements: World War II; Battle of the Philippines Battle of Bataan

- Decorations: Distinguished Unit Citation; Air Force Outstanding Unit Award; Philippine Presidential Unit Citation

Commanders
- Notable commanders: Howell M. Estes III

Insignia
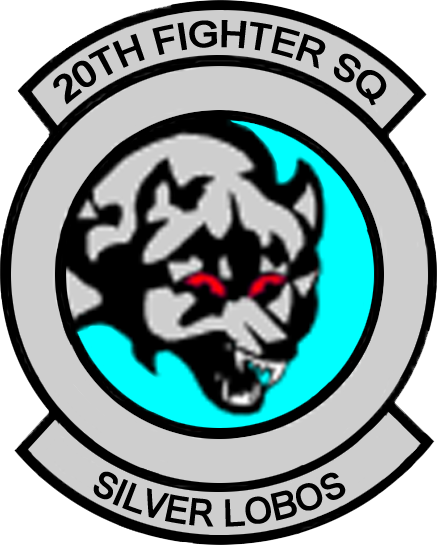
- 20th Fighter Squadron emblem (approved 17 October 1994)

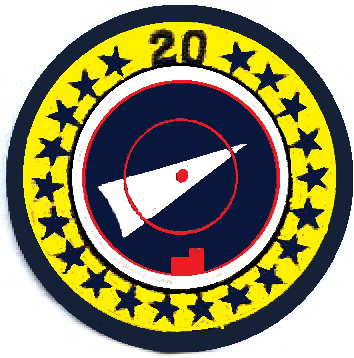
- 20 Tactical Fighter Training Sq emblem (approved 4 March 1977)

The 20th Fighter Squadron is an inactive United States Air Force (USAF) squadron. It was most recently part of the 49th Fighter Wing at Holloman Air Force Base, New Mexico, where it operated the McDonnell F-4 Phantom II aircraft, conducting training and air superiority missions. It was inactivated on 20 December 2004.

== History ==
=== World War II ===
The 20th was one of the original squadrons of the 35th Pursuit Group and trained in California with the group, flying Curtiss P-36 Hawks. At the end of 1940, the squadron departed for the Philippines and assignment to the Philippine Department's flying element there, the 4th Composite Group and was equipped with obsolescent Boeing P-26 Peashooters.

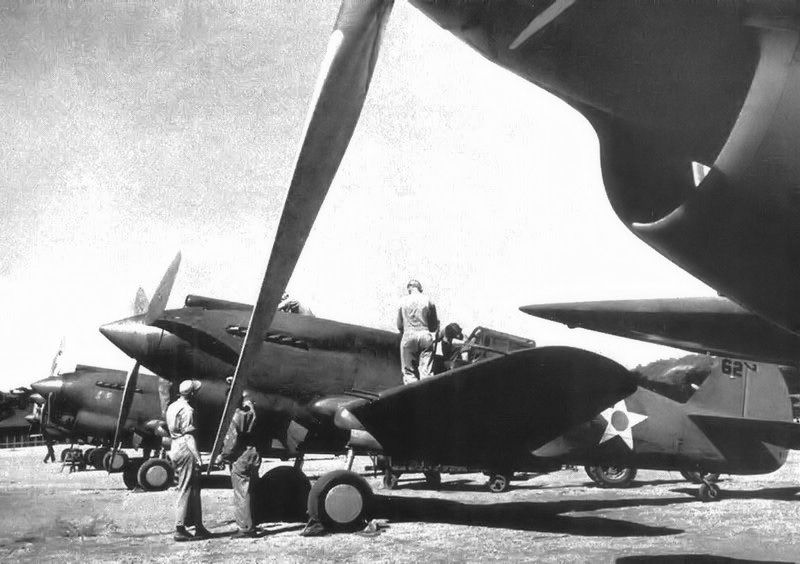
20th Pursuit Squadron Curtiss P-40B Warhawks Clark Field, Field, Luzon, 1941

In October 1941, The Philippine Department Air Force was renamed Far East Air Force and organized its pursuit squadrons into the 24th Pursuit Group, which consisted of the 20th Pursuit Squadron plus the 3d and 17th Pursuit Squadrons, along with two recently arrived squadrons that were attached to the group. The squadron re-equipped with Curtiss P-40B Warhawks.

The 20th began to fly combat missions in the Philippines from the morning of 8 December 1941, when Japanese aircraft were erroneously reported to be approaching Luzon. When the Japanese actually attacked at midday, the pilots of the 20th Pursuit Squadron were in their cockpits on the ground at Clark Field after refueling, awaiting orders to scramble, when Japanese bombers arrived. Only three aircraft were able to get off the ground before bombs destroyed the rest of the squadron and killed four pilots.

The squadron's pilots, pooled with the remainder of the group, continued to fly missions until about 2 April 1942, including patrol and reconnaissance missions, air-to-air combat, and strikes against enemy airfields and shipping. The squadron's ground echelon fought as an infantry unit in Bataan from 18 January to 12 February 1942, when it was recalled to act as airdrome troops at Mariveles Field, the last operational airstrip on Bataan. It surrendered to Japanese forces along with those pilots who had not been evacuated to Australia on 9 April 1942.

The squadron was carried on Army rolls as an active unit but was not operational from the fall of the Philippines until it was inactivated on 2 April 1946.

=== 20th Fighter Squadron ===
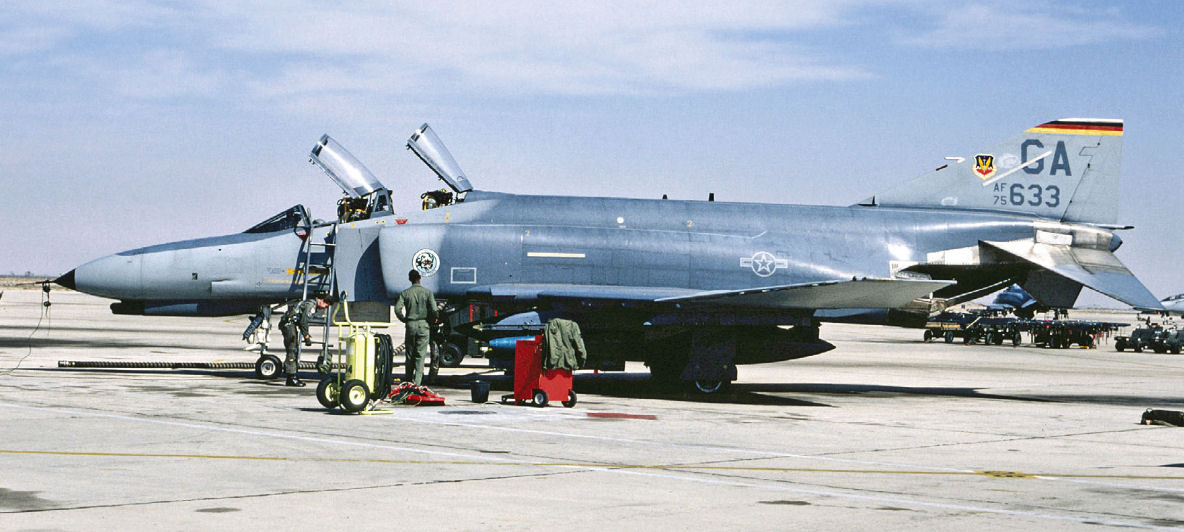
20th Fighter Squadron F-4E is readied for an air-to-ground sortie in 1991 (Note: Aircraft is McDonnell F-4E Phantom II serial 75-633. All Luftwaffe F-4Es featured the TISEO housing, however, the equipment was not installed.)

In 1971, the West German government chose the F-4 Phantom II as a replacement for its Lockheed F-104G Starfighter interceptors. The version purchased (F-4F) was a stripped-down version of the USAF F-4E, which was significantly cheaper and incorporated major components that were manufactured in West Germany. As part of the purchase, an agreement was made between the West German government and the United States for the USAF to conduct basic F-4 transition and instructor training.

Under this agreement, the USAF reactivated the 20th as the 20th Tactical Fighter Training Squadron (20th TFTS) at George AFB, California on 1 December 1972. At the time George AFB was the primary USAF transition training base for F-4s under Tactical Air Command. The flying weather in Southern California also is much better than it is in northern Europe. The 20th TFTS was assigned to the 35th Tactical Fighter Training Wing. It also supported members of the Luftwaffe 1st Training Squadron, under which German Air Force personnel were assigned while in the United States.

Initially equipped with USAF F-4E aircraft, training began for the German pilots in the spring of 1973. Later, as the F-4F was put into production by McDonnell, the F-4Es were replaced with twelve West German F-4Fs were that were given the unofficial designation of TF-4F while they were being used to train Luftwaffe crews in the United States. The Luftwaffe F-4Fs were operated with US national markings and given USAF tailcodes.

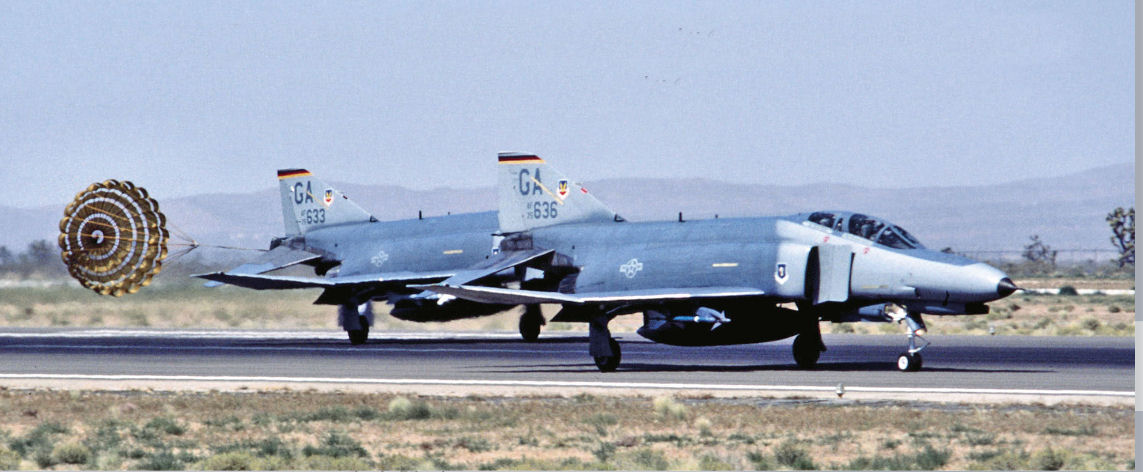
20th Fighter Squadron Phantoms rolling out at George AFB, California, 1992 (Note: Aircraft are McDonnell F-4E Phantom II serials 75-633 and 75-636.)

These planes were replaced in 1978 by ten F-4Es purchased by the West German government specifically for training in the United States, and the Luftwaffe F-4Fs were then returned to West Germany. Students of the squadron came from the Luftwaffe's JG 71 "Richthofen" and Jagdgeschwader 74 "Mölders" (interceptor wings) and Jagdbombergeschwader 35 and 36 (JaBoG 36) (fighter bomber wings). In 1979, the squadron was commanded by Lt. Col. Howell M. Estes III, who later commanded Air Force Space Command as a general.

Training at George ended on 5 June 1992 as part of the drawdown of the 35th Fighter Wing. George AFB was designated to be closed under BRAC '91, and the base was officially decommissioned in December 1992. The 20th was inactivated, and the training was reassigned to the 9th Fighter Squadron, 49th Operations Group at Holloman Air Force Base, New Mexico. At the time of the transfer, the Luftwaffe owned seven of the F-4Fs, and the 20th owned 17 F-4Es.

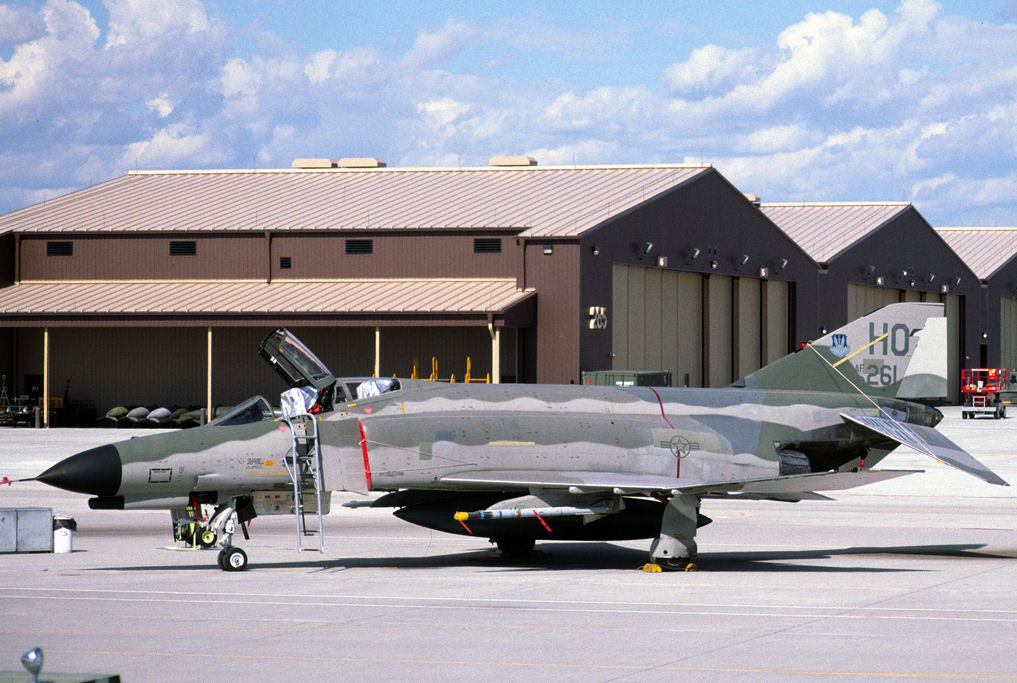
20th Fighter Squadron F-4F Phantom at Holloman AFB about 1992 (Note: Aircraft is Luftwaffe McDonnell Douglas F-4F-59-MC Phantom serial 72-1261.)

On 1 July 1993, the 20th was reactivated with the 9th and was reassigned to fly the Lockheed F-117 Nighthawk stealth fighter when it arrived at Holloman. By this time the 20th was flying German F-4E/ICF and F-4F/ICE (Improved Combat Efficiency) Phantom IIs with upgraded radar and other avionics. In the 1990s, the 20th Fighter Squadron also hosted the German Air Force Weapons School, and the leadership consisted of both a US and German Lieutenant Colonel. The Luftwaffe began to operate former East German MiG-29s, and several of these aircraft from JG 73 were flown to New Mexico to train with the F-4Fs of the 20th. The F-4Es were removed from training and sent to Germany in 1997.

By the early 2000s, the German Air Force was phasing out the Phantoms in favor of the Panavia Tornado IDS and Eurofighter Typhoon interceptors. In its final year, the squadron was composed of just 13 US military officers, who brought their prior collective experience in the F-15C, F-16 and F-4 to the German students arriving from pilot training for tactical training in the F-4F. The F-4F/ICEs were retired and the program at Holloman was officially ended on 20 December 2004 and its aircraft were transferred to the Aerospace Maintenance and Regeneration Center. The first arrival, 72-1118, was delivered by Col. Kevin Zeeck on 18 November. The second, 72-1218, arrived at the base two days later. The remaining 14 F-4s arrived at AMARC by the second week of January 2005 in 4 further waves.

The 20th Fighter Squadron was the last operational United States Air Force squadron to fly the F-4 Phantom II. (although target drone QF-4s were flown until 2013). The last of the Luftwaffe F-4F Phantom IIs in Germany were retired on 30 June 2013 by JG 71, although four aircraft remain in service for aerial demonstrations.

== Lineage ==
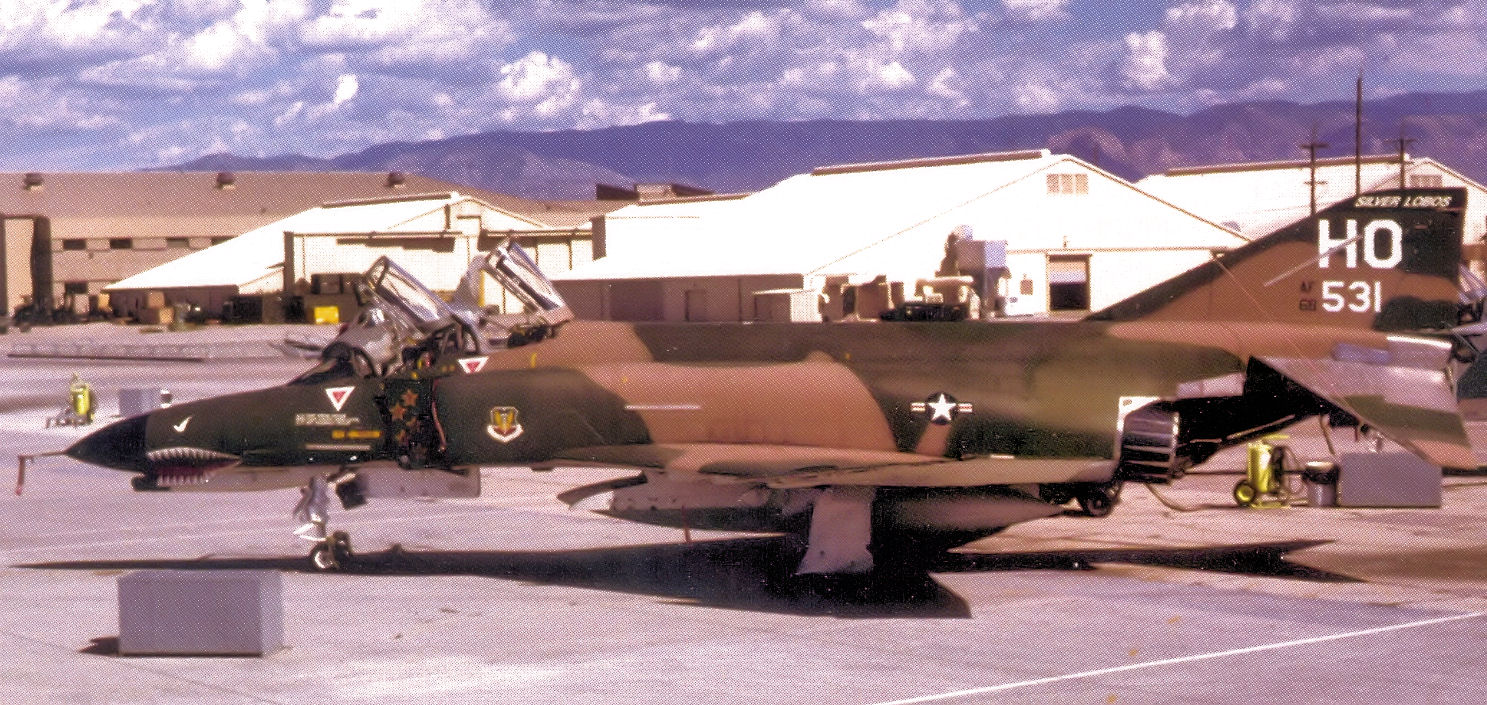
20th Tactical Fighter Training Squadron F-4E Phantom (Note: Aircraft is McDonnell Douglas F-4E-41-MC Phantom 68-531 repainted in Southeast Asia camouflage along with a "shark mouth" and five MiG kill markings to commemorate the 20th anniversary of Captain Steve Richie becoming a USAF Ace during the Vietnam War. This aircraft was retired to the Aerospace Maintenance and Regeneration Center as FP1059 on 22 October 1997.)

- Constituted as the 20th Pursuit Squadron (Interceptor) on 22 December 1939

Activated on 1 February 1940
Inactivated on 2 April 1946

- Redesignated 20th Tactical Fighter Training Squadron on 27 October 1972

Activated on 1 December 1972

- Redesignated 20th Tactical Fighter Squadron, 5 October 1989
- Redesignated 20th Fighter Squadron, 1 November 1991

Inactivated on 5 June 1992

- Activated on 1 July 1993

Inactivated on 20 December 2004

=== Assignments ===
- 35th Pursuit Group, 1 February 1940
- 4th Composite Group, 14 December 1940
- 24th Pursuit Group, 1 October 1941 – 2 April 1946
- 35th Tactical Fighter Training Wing (later 35th Tactical Fighter Wing, 35th Fighter Wing), 1 December 1972 – 5 June 1992
- 49th Fighter Wing, 1 July 1993 – 20 December 2004.

=== Stations ===
- Moffett Field, California, 1 February 1940
- Hamilton Field, California, 10 September – 30 October 1940
- Nichols Field, Luzon, Philippines, c. 18 November 1940
- Clark Field, Luzon, Philippines, July 1941
- Bataan Airfield, Luzon, Philippines, 25 December 1941 – April 1942

Operated from Lubao, Luzon, Philippines, 25–31 December 1941
Operated from Del Monte Field, Mindanao, Philippines, c. 8 April–May 1942

- George Air Force Base, California, 1 November 1972 – 5 June 1992
- Holloman Air Force Base, New Mexico, 1 July 1993 – 20 December 2004.

=== Awards ===
- Distinguished Unit Citation
- 7 December 1941 – 10 May 1942 (Philippine Islands)
- 8 December 1941 – 22 December 1941 (Philippine Islands)
- 6 January 1942 – 8 March 1942 (Philippine Islands)
- Air Force Outstanding Unit Award
- 2 February 1976 – 31 March 1977
- 1 June 1985 – 31 May 1987
- 1 March 1990 – 29 February 1992
- 1 June 1998 – 31 May 1999
- Philippine Republic Presidential Unit Citation
- 7 December 1941 – 10 May 1942
- Pacific Theater
- Campaign: Philippine Islands

=== Aircraft ===
- P-36 Hawk (1940)
- P-26 Peashooter (1940–1941)
- P-35 (1941)
- P-40 Warhawk (1941–1942)
- F-4 Phantom II (1972–1992) 1993–2004
