= Attack on Clark Field =

1941 Japanese airstrikes in the Philippines

- Part of the Asia and the Pacific Theater of World War II
Date	8 December 1941
Location	Clark Field, Angeles, Pampanga, Philippines
Result	Japanese victory

Belligerents
United States: Commonwealth of the Philippines	Japan

Commanders and leaders
Douglas MacArthur; Lewis H. Brereton (Commonwealth of the Philippines) Manuel L. Quezon (Commonwealth of the Philippines) Basilio J. Valdez	(Empire of Japan) Nishizō Tsukahara

Strength
35 bombers 117 fighters ~155 older aircraft 15,000 U.S. & Filipino troops	108 bombers 84 fighters

Casualties and losses
12 B-17 bombers destroyed 40 P-40 fighters destroyed ~50 older aircraft destroyed 80 killed 150 wounded	7 fighter aircraft shot down

The attack on Clark Field (Filipino: Paglusob sa Kampo ng Clark; Kapampangan: Lusuban king Kampo ning Clark) was part of a series of morning airstrikes on United States Pacific island military bases opening Japanese participation in World War II. The attack was intended to minimize interference from the Far East Air Force (FEAF) during the subsequent invasion of the Philippines by the Empire of Japan. Capture of the Philippines was essential to control shipping routes between Japan and the Greater East Asia Co-Prosperity Sphere. Hostilities were initiated by the attack on Pearl Harbor at 07:48 Hawaiian Time (UTC−10:30) on 7 December 1941.

As dawn moved westward across the Pacific (and the International Date Line), daylight airstrikes followed at mid-day (UTC+12) on Wake Island, at 09:27 (UTC+10) on Guam, at 06:00 (UTC+8) on Davao, at 09:30 (UTC+8) on Baguio and at 12:35 (UTC+8) on Clark Field. At the same time as the attack on Clark field, a smaller fighter base at Iba in Luzon was also bombed. United States Army Air Forces aircraft losses on the ground in the Philippines were similar to those sustained on Oahu despite nine hours available for preparations following the Pearl Harbor attack; but commanding general Douglas MacArthur and other senior commanders avoided the disgrace suffered by Hawaiian commanders, who were relieved of command and forced into retirement after an official investigation.

In contrast, there was no official investigation of events in the Philippines.

== Manila ==
Manila was the United States forward military base in the Pacific, with strategic significance comparable to Singapore for the British Empire. Lieutenant General Douglas MacArthur commanded United States Army Forces in the Far East (USAFFE) from headquarters in Manila. MacArthur's command included ground forces and the FEAF. Clark Field was the primary air base for the bombers expected to provide offensive airstrike capability under the Rainbow 5 war plan. Fighter aircraft expected to provide defensive cover could use Clark Field or satellite airfields including Nichols Field and Nielson Field to the southeast, Iba Airfield to the west, and Del Carmen Airfield to the south.

FEAF also protected Naval Base Cavite serving as the home port for the cruisers, destroyers, submarines, and flying boats of the Asiatic Fleet.

== Far East Air Force ==
FEAF with headquarters at Neilson Field was under the command of Major General Lewis H. Brereton, who was required to report to MacArthur through MacArthur's chief of staff, Brigadier General Richard K. Sutherland. At the time of the attack, FEAF had more planes than the Hawaiian Department protecting Pearl Harbor. The fleet of 35 Boeing B-17 Flying Fortress bombers was the largest number assigned to any army air force. Clark Field was the primary base for the B-17s, where these heavy planes were stored without camouflage on ramps lest they become mired in the undrained soft soil surrounding those graded surfaces. B-17s could also use Del Monte Airfield in southern Mindanao where military personnel lived and worked in tents on a pineapple plantation.

Aircraft at Del Monte were beyond the range of land-based Japanese bombers but were similarly unable to reach Japanese targets. In addition to the B-17s, FEAF aircraft inventory on 8 December included 91 Curtiss P-40 Warhawk fighters, 26 Seversky P-35 fighters, 18 Douglas B-18 Bolo bombers, 12 Boeing P-26 Peashooter fighters, 11 Curtiss O-52 Owl observation planes, 2 Douglas O-46 observation planes, 8 North American A-27 ground attack aircraft, and 3 Martin B-10 bombers. and title= December 8, 1941 MacArthur's Pearl Harbor. publisher=Texas A&M University Press| appendix C | year=2003.

== Events of 8 December 1941 ==
Local time chronology (UTC+8):

- 02:40 - Asiatic Fleet Headquarters received notification of the Pearl Harbor attack but did not inform MacArthur.
- 03:40 - Sutherland heard a commercial radio broadcast with news of the Pearl Harbor attack, and notified MacArthur.
- 04:00 - Sutherland notified FEAF headquarters of the Pearl Harbor attack.
- 05:00 - Sutherland refused Brereton's request to launch a B-17 raid on Formosa from Clark shortly after daylight. They agreed to prepare for a mission preceded by a photoreconnaissance mission, but to await MacArthur's permission for the offensive operations.
- 05:30 - A War Department message reached MacArthur's headquarters confirming war status with Japan requiring Rainbow 5 plan air raids against Japanese targets within range of the Philippines.
- 06:15 - MacArthur's staff received notification of Japanese aircraft attack on Davao Field, Mindanao.
- 07:15 - Sutherland refused to allow Brereton to speak with MacArthur and directed him to await orders.
- 08:00 - General Henry H. Arnold called from Washington, D.C. warning Brereton not to let his planes be attacked on the ground.
- 08:30 - Brereton launched three squadron-sized fighter patrols and all serviceable B-17s from Clark Field went aloft in a holding pattern.
- 08:50 - Brereton called Sutherland requesting permission to launch a raid on Formosa and was told to wait.
- 09:25 - Japanese 5th Air Group bombers from Formosa bombed Tuguegarao Field and USAFFE summer headquarters at Baguio. Brereton telephoned Sutherland, and was refused permission to launch an offensive airstrike.
- 09:30 - 11th Air Fleet of 26 Mitsubishi G3M bombers, 82 Mitsubishi G4M bombers and 84 Mitsubishi A6M Zero fighters took off from Formosa.
- 09:40 - Sutherland gave Brereton authorization to launch the photoreconnaissance mission.
- 10:14 - MacArthur gave Brereton authorization for an air strike.
- 10:30 - Planes launched at 08:30 landed to be refueled.
- 10:45 - Brereton orders the B-17s landing at Clark Field to be armed with 100-pound (45 kg) and 300-pound (140 kg) bombs anticipating launch at 14:00 for an attack on southern Formosa airfields at dusk.
- 11:30 - Iba Field RADAR detected the incoming 11th Air Fleet 130 miles (210 km) out.
- 11:45 - Iba Field and Clark Field begin launching fighters to intercept the raid.
- 12:00 - Clark Field received warning of the approaching airstrike.
- 12:10 - Cameras for the photoreconnaissance mission arrived at Clark to be loaded aboard B-17s.
- 12:35 - Clark Field was launching reserve fighters as 11th Air Fleet began an hour-long bombing and strafing of Clark Field and Iba Field.

== Air raid ==
At 12:35 a horizontal bombing run at 20,000 feet (6,100 m) by 26 Mitsubishi G3M bombers and 27 Mitsubishi G4M bombers released 636 60-kilogram (130 lb) bombs over Clark Field. These planes were above the range of Clark Field anti-aircraft guns. As the bombers departed 34 Mitsubishi A6M Zero fighters strafed undamaged planes on the ground at Clark Field. Seven minutes later, 53 Mitsubishi G4M bombers dropped 486 60-kilogram (130 lb) bombs and 26 250-kilogram (550 lb) bombs on Iba Field, followed by 51 strafing Mitsubishi A6M Zero fighters. Destruction at Iba Field was so complete the Zeros flew on to Clark Field to find targets for their remaining ammunition.

== Results ==
Of the seventeen B-17s on the ground at Clark Field, twelve were destroyed, four were damaged, and one escaped damage. Two evaded damage while on reconnaissance missions and returned after the raid. Eleven B-17s had been flown to Mindanao before the raid, and five more reached there on the day of the attack. The P-40 fighters aloft were unable to reach the altitude of the Japanese bombers, and suffered a poor exchange rate in low-altitude combat with strafing Zero fighters. Thirty-four P-40s were destroyed on the ground or in aerial combat.

Older P-35 and P-26 fighters were obsolete for air-to-air combat, but were used for training, and might have been useful for observation and ground attack had they survived until the invasion.

== Aftermath ==
United States Army Air Forces commanding general Henry H. Arnold called Brereton that afternoon to ask "how the hell" he was caught by surprise nine hours after receiving news of the Pearl Harbor attack. Walter Short was relieved of command of the Hawaiian Department on 17 December by Army chief of staff general George C. Marshall, who took no similar action against MacArthur despite remarking to a reporter a few days later: "I just don't know how MacArthur happened to let his planes get caught on the ground."
