= 4th Composite Group =

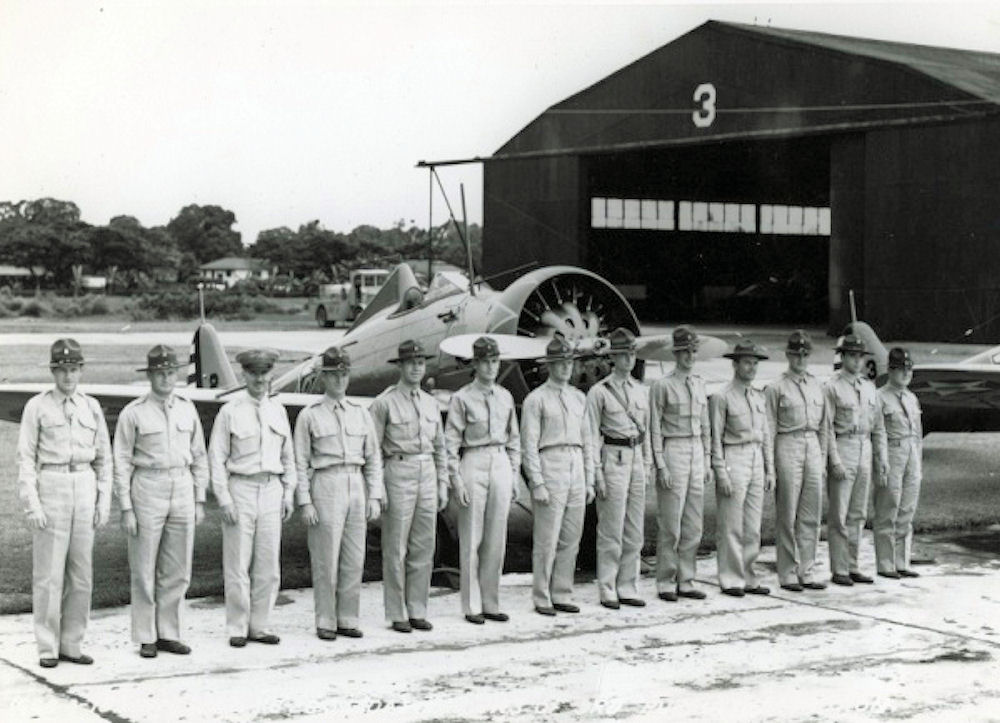
- Officers of the 3d Pursuit Squadron in formation in front of a squadron Boeing P-26 Peashooter, Clark Field, Luzon, Philippines, 1937
- Active: 1919–1941
- Country: United States
- Branch: United States Army Air Corps
- Type: Air Defense
- Part of: Philippine Department
- Garrison/HQ: Nichols Field
- Mottos: Up and at 'Em

Insignia
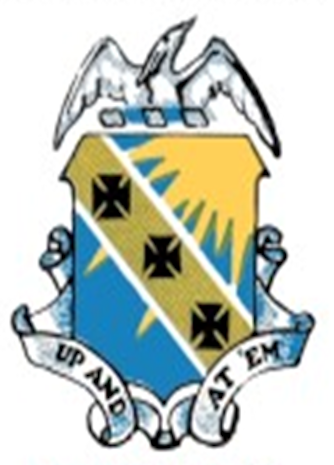
- 4th Composite Group emblem

The 4th Composite Group is an inactive United States Army Air Corps unit. It was last was assigned to the United States Army Philippine Department at Nichols Field, Commonwealth of the Philippines. It was disbanded on 1 November 1941.

The Group was the primary command and control organization for all Army Air Corps units in the Commonwealth of the Philippines from 1919 until the eve of World War II in November 1941.

== History ==
=== Inter-war years ===
The unit was formed from the World War I 2d, 3d and 28th Aero Squadrons in 1919 (its emblem represents the three squadrons with Maltese crosses). The 2d Aero Squadron, having served in the Philippines beginning in 1915, was transferred back from Rockwell Field, California in 1920 after training duties in the United States during the war. The 3d Aero Squadron, also a stateside training unit during the war, was transferred from Mitchel Field, New York in 1920. The 28th Aero Squadron, which had served in combat on the Western Front during the war, was transferred to the group in 1922.

The units were re-designated as the 2d Observation Squadron, 3d Pursuit Squadron, and the 28th Bombardment Squadron, which represented the missions of the components of the group. Its mission was tactical training for coastal defense. Exercises and maneuvers with Army ground forces and Naval forces were a regular and important part of its mission. Another mission of the 4th Composite Group during the 1920s was aerial mapping of the Philippines, the topography of many of the islands were largely unknown. The aerial mapping mission was the primary mission of the 2d Observation Squadron.

In the Philippines, the group largely received a wide variety of second-line aircraft over the years from the United States; Air Corps overseas units in the Philippines as well as the Panama Canal Zone were notorious for being the last units to receive the hand-me-down aircraft during the austere years of Air Corps procurement during the 1920s and 1930s.

Beginning in 1934, the Philippine Constabulary Air Corps (PCAC) was created. The Philippine department of the US Army lent the Commonwealth government the services of men from the 4th Composite Group to train the officers and personnel of the budding Air Corps, making it one of the earliest independent Air Forces in Asia.

=== Prelude to war ===
In 1940, political relations between the United States and the Japanese Empire reached a crisis with the Japanese occupation of French Indochina. With war clouds forming, a reinforcement effort was made to the Air Corps units in the Philippines. On or about 1 November 1940, the 4th was reinforced by the 17th Pursuit Squadron from the 1st Pursuit Group, being transferred from Selfridge Field, Michigan. The 20th Pursuit Squadron, from the 35th Pursuit Group at Hamilton Field, California also was transferred. Both of these squadrons, however, had only sent their personnel and both were equipped in the Philippines with the obsolete Boeing P-26 Peashooter.

In May 1941, the 3d, 17th and 20th squadrons were re-equipped with Seversky P-35As that were manufactured for the Swedish Air Force. On 24 October 1940, President Franklin Roosevelt signed an executive order requisitioning all the undelivered P-35s sold to Sweden and impressing them into the USAAC. 40 of the planes arrived at the Manila Air Depot in Swedish markings, with Swedish language technical orders and Swedish marked instrumentation. These planes all required modification at the depot before being turned over to the squadrons for operational use. The 28th Bombardment Squadron also received some Douglas B-18 Bolos.

During the summer of 1941, Nichols Field was undergoing construction of an east–west runway, making the north–south runway unusable due to a lack of drainage. The 4th was forced to move all of its squadrons to Clark Field with the exception of the 17th Pursuit Squadron. The 17th was sent to Iba Airfield on the north coast of Luzon where it was undergoing gunnery training. In July, the 20th Pursuit Squadron was upgraded to the P-40B. At the same time, about 100 new pilots out of training school at Randolph Field arrived. A training unit was set up to provide transition training for the new pilots into pursuit aircraft. In September, the 17th was moved to the still uncompleted Nichols Field when word was received that space at Clark was needed for B-17 Flying Fortresses of the incoming 19th Bombardment Group. The 3d Squadron was sent up to Iba for gunnery training to free up the space. However the 17th suffered from the ongoing construction at Nichols, which caused several ground accidents.

With the large number of units being deployed to the Philippines during the buildup of forces in the summer and fall of 1941, the 3d, 17th and 20th Squadrons were reassigned to the new 24th Pursuit Group, which was activated at Clark Field. The 28th Bombardment Squadron was transferred to the newly arriving 19th Bombardment Group. With its tactical squadrons transferred, the organization was no longer needed and the 2d Observation Squadron was assigned directly to Far East Air Force Headquarters. Subsequently, the 4th Composite Group was disbanded.

=== Lineage ===
- Organized as 1st Group (Observation) on 14 August 1919

Re-designated as 4th Group (Observation) on 14 March 1921
Re-designated as 4th Group (Pursuit and Bombardment) on 29 June 1922
Re-designated as 4th Group (Composite) in July 1922
Re-designated as 4th Composite Group on 25 January 1923
Disbanded on 1 November 1941.

=== Assignments ===
- Philippine Department, 14 August 1919 – 1 November 1941

=== Components ===
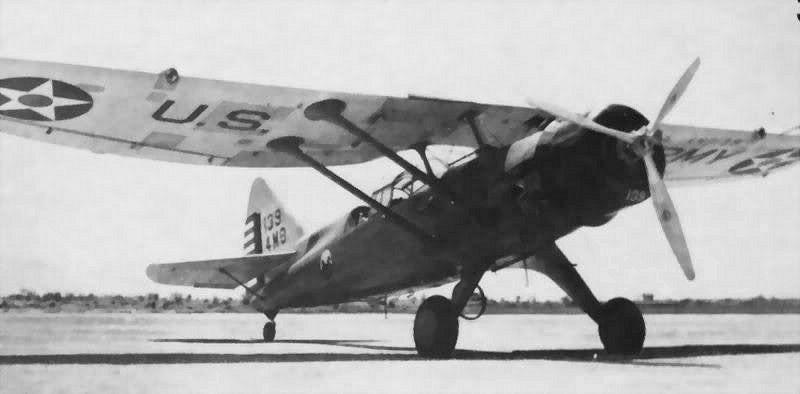
2d Observation Squadron Douglas O-46A 36-139 Nichols Field, Luzon, Philippines, 1939 (4M tail designation of 4th Composite Group)

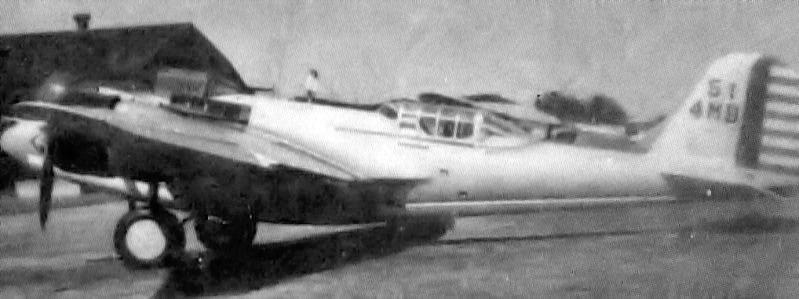
28th Bombardment Squadron Martin B-10B 34–51, Clark Field, Luzon, Philippines, 1937

- 2d Aero (later, 2d Observation) Squadron, 10 March 1920 – 28 October 1941

Transferred from: Rockwell Field, California, stationed at: Fort Mills, Corregidor Island, Philippines, 10 March 1920
Stationed at: Kindley Field, Corregidor Island, Philippines, 15 October 1920
Stationed at: Nichols Field, Luzon, Philippines, January 1929
Stationed at: Clark Field, Luzon, Philippines, 18 November 1940
Stationed at: Nichols Field, Luzon, Philippines, 18 November 1940 – 28 October 1941

- 3d Aero (later, 3d Pursuit) Squadron, 10 March 1920 – 1 October 1941

Transferred from: Mitchel Field, New York, stationed at: Camp Stotsenburg, Philippines, 10 March 1920
Stationed at: Clark Field, Luzon, Philippines, 15 October 1920 – 1 October 1941

- 28th Bombardment Squadron, 2 December 1922 – 1 November 1941

Transferred from: Mather Field, California, stationed at: Clark Field, Luzon, Philippines, 2 December 1922
Stationed at: Nichols Field, Luzon, Philippines, 4 June 1923
Stationed at: Clark Field, Luzon. Philippines, 16 June 1938 – 1 November 1941

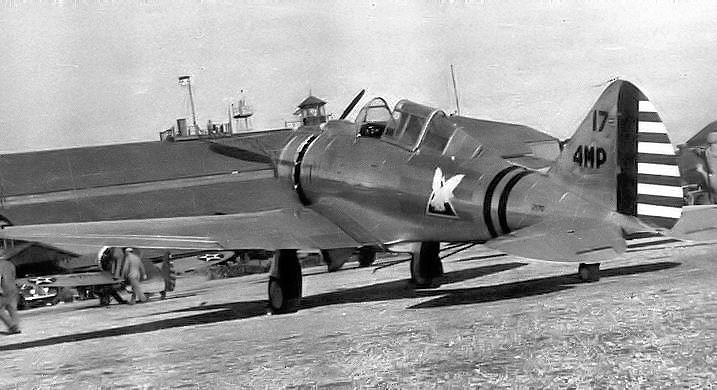
17th Pursuit Squadron ex-Swedish Seversky P-35A #17 Nichols Field, Luzon, Philippines 1941.

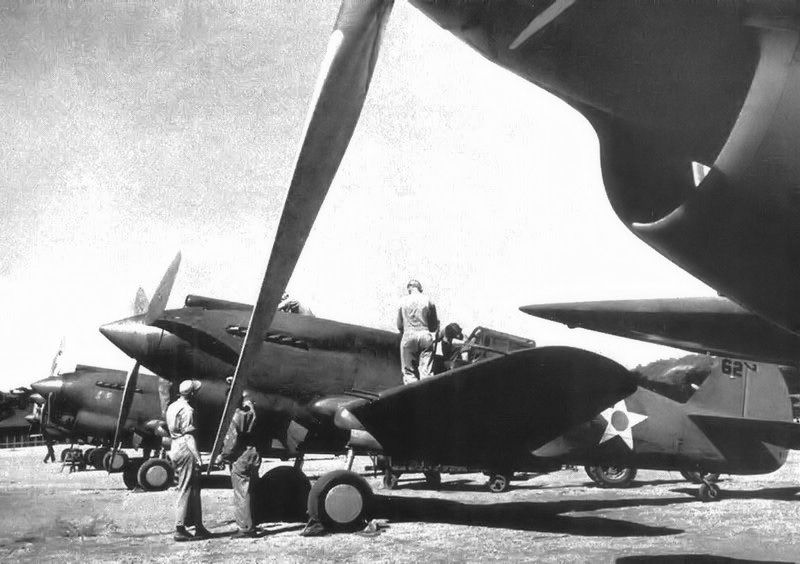
20th Pursuit Squadron Curtiss P-40B Warhawks Nichols Field, Luzon, 1941

- 17th Pursuit Squadron, 14 December 1940 – 1 October 1941

Transferred from: Selfridge Field, Michigan, stationed at: Clark Field, Luzon. Philippines, 23 November 1940
Stationed at: Nichols Field, Luzon, Philippines, 5 December 1940 – 1 October 1941

- 20th Pursuit Squadron, 14 December 1940 – 1 October 1941

Transferred from: Hamilton Field, California, stationed at: Nichols Field, Luzon, Philippines

- Air Park No, 11 (later 66th Service Squadron, 2 June 1921 – 1 September 1936

Stationed at: Clark Field, Luzon, Philippines, 2 June 1921
Stationed at: Nichols Field, Luzon, Philippines, 14 December 1921 – 1 September 1936

- 6th Photo Section, 10 March 1920-unknown
- Branch Intelligence Office No. 12 (later, 42d Air Intelligence Section), by 27 May 1922 – 1 January 1925

=== Stations ===
- Camp Nichols (Later Nichols Field), Philippine Islands, 15 August 1919 – 1 November 1941
