= Nichols Field =

Airfield near Manila, Philippines

Nichols Field
- Part of the Fifth Air Force
- Located near: Manila, Luzon, Philippines
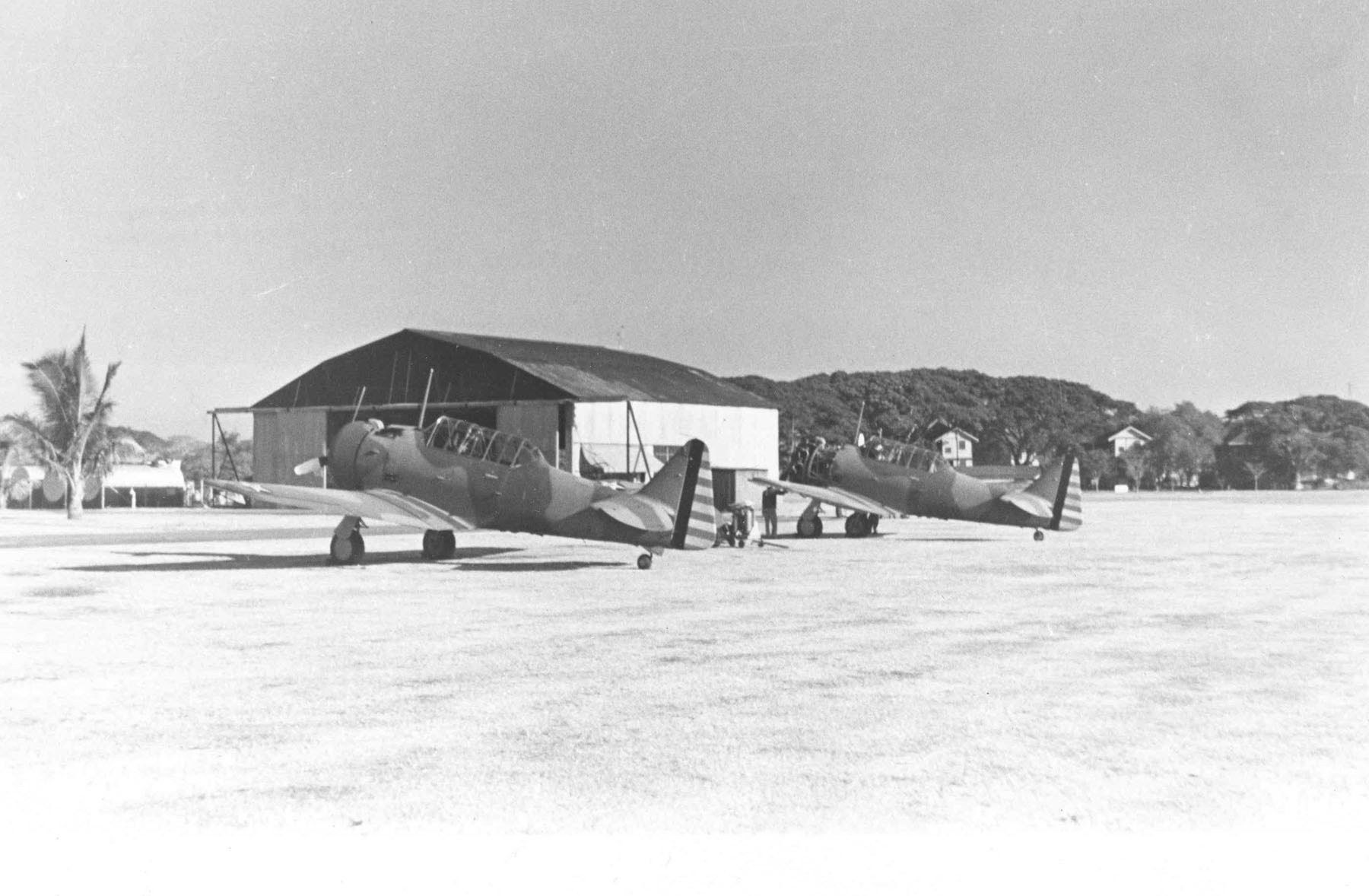
- Two North American A-27s of the 17th Pursuit Squadron at Nichols Field, Philippines, in 1941.

Site information
- Type: Military airfield
- Controlled by: Air Service, United States Army 1919–1926; United States Army Air Corps 1926–1941; United States Army Air Forces 1941–1942; 1945–1946 (Occupied by the Imperial Japanese Navy Air Service, 1942–1945)

Location
- Coordinates: 14°30′34″N 121°01′06″E

Site history
- Built: 1919
- Built by: Air Service, United States Army
- In use: 1941–1946
- Battles/wars: World War II

- Events: Battle of the Philippines (1941–42); Philippines Campaign (1944–45)

Nichols Field was a U.S. military airfield located south of Manila in Pasay and Parañaque, Luzon, the Philippines.

== History ==
=== Origins ===
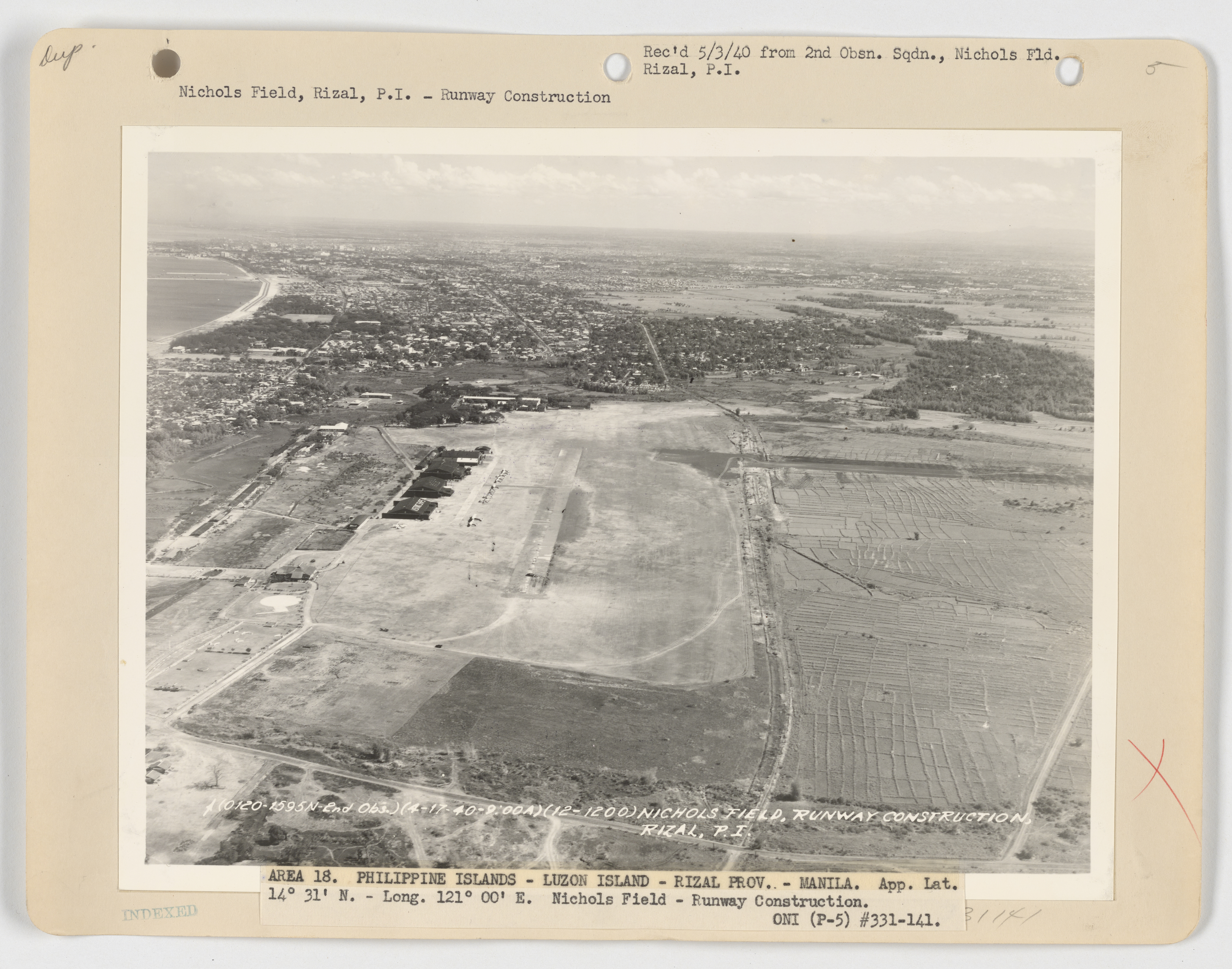
Nichols Field runway construction

Camp Nichols was established by the Air Service, United States Army in 1919. Located near Fort William McKinley, south of Manila, it initially was the home of the 1st Group (Observation), being activated on 14 August 1919, Nichols Field became the headquarters of the Philippine Department Air Force, under the Army Philippine Department.

The 1st Group (later 4th Composite Group) consisted of the 2d, 3d and 28th Aero Squadrons in 1919. The 2d Aero Squadron (2d Observation Squadron), having served in the Philippines beginning in 1915, was transferred back from Rockwell Field, California in 1920 after training duties in the United States during the war. The 3d Aero Squadron (3d Pursuit Squadron), also a stateside training unit during the war, was transferred from Mitchel Field, New York in 1920. The 28th Aero Squadron (28th Bombardment Squadron), which had served in combat on the Western Front during the war, was transferred to the group in 1922. The 3d Pursuit Squadron was moved to Clark Field upon its arrival in 1920 and Nichols became home of Air Park No, 11 (later 66th Service Squadron, which supported the group logistically with equipment, supplies and vehicles both at Nichols and Clark Fields). It also became the home of the Manila Air Depot, which provided maintenance support for all Army and Navy aircraft in the Philippines.

The primary operational mission of Nichols Field was tactical training for coastal defense of Luzon. Due to its proximity to Manila, it also was the primary command and control base for the Philippine Department Air Force. Exercises and maneuvers with Army ground forces and Naval forces were a regular and important part of its mission. Another mission of Nichols Field during the 1920s was aerial mapping of the Philippines; the topography of many of the islands were largely unknown. The aerial mapping mission was the primary mission of the 2d Observation Squadron, which moved between Clark and Nichols during the 1920s and 1930s.

=== Prelude to war ===
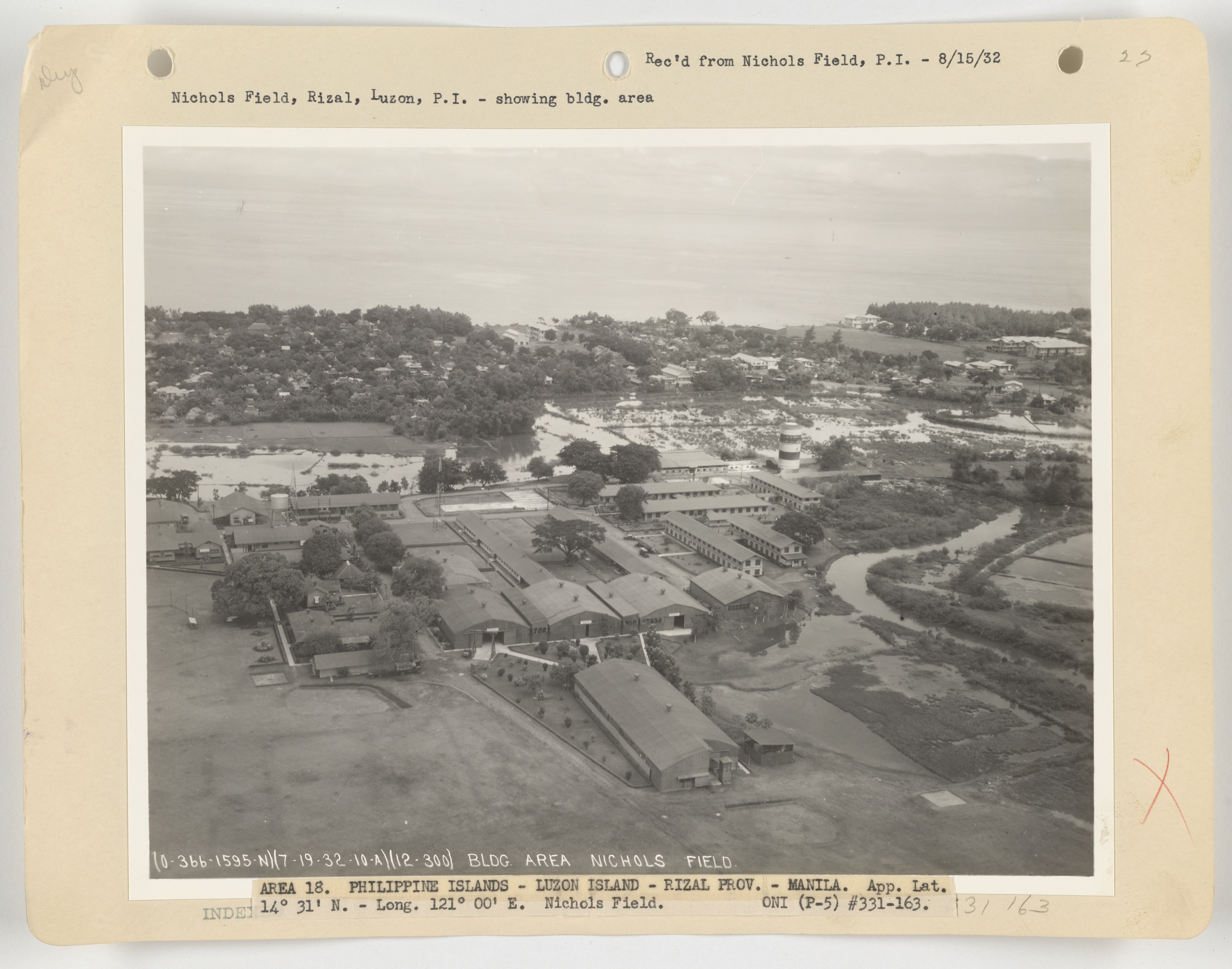
Nichols Field building area, 1932

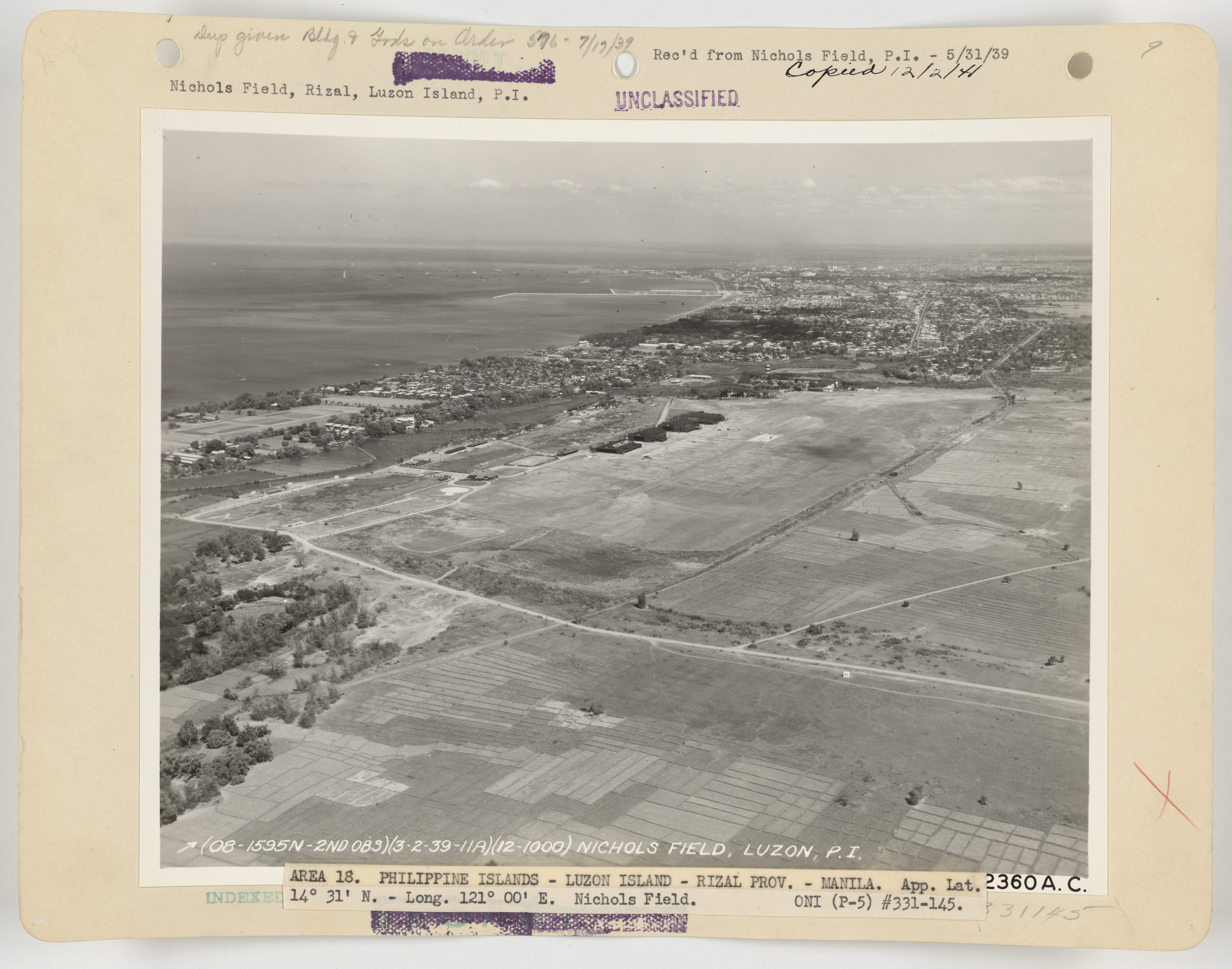
Aerial view of Nichols Field, 1939

In 1940, political relations between the United States and the Empire of Japan reached a crisis with the Japanese occupation of French Indochina. With war clouds forming, a reinforcement effort was made to the Air Corps units in the Philippines.

On or around 1 November 1940, the 4th Composite was reinforced by the 17th Pursuit Squadron from the 1st Pursuit Group, being transferred from Selfridge Field, Michigan to Nichols Field. Nichols Field was commanded by Col. Lawrence S. Churchill. The 20th Pursuit Squadron, from the 35th Pursuit Group at Hamilton Field, California, also was transferred to Nichols. Both of these squadrons, however, had only sent their personnel and both were equipped in the Philippines with the obsolete Boeing P-26 Peashooter. In May 1941, the 17th and 20th squadrons were re-equipped with Seversky P-35As that were manufactured for the Swedish Air Force. On 24 October 1940, President Franklin D. Roosevelt signed an executive order requisitioning all the undelivered P-35s sold to Sweden and impressing them into the USAAC. Forty of the planes arrived at the Manila Air Depot in Swedish markings, with Swedish language technical orders and Swedish-marked instrumentation. These planes all required modification at the depot before being turned over to the squadrons for operational use. The 28th Bombardment Squadron also received some Douglas B-18 Bolos.

During summer 1941, Nichols Field was undergoing construction of an east–west runway, making the north–south runway unusable due to a lack of drainage. All of the flying units at Nichols were moved to Clark Field with the exception of the 17th Pursuit Squadron. The 17th was sent to Iba Airfield on the north coast of Luzon where it was undergoing gunnery training. In September, the 17th was moved to the still uncompleted Nichols Field when word was received that space at Clark was needed for B-17 Flying Fortresses of the incoming 19th Bombardment Group. The 3d Squadron was sent up to Iba for gunnery training to free up the space. However the 17th suffered from the ongoing construction at Nichols, which caused several ground accidents.

With the large number of units being deployed to the Philippines during the buildup of forces in the summer and fall of 1941, the 3rd, 17th and 20th Squadrons were reassigned to the new 24th Pursuit Group, which was activated at Clark Field. The 2d Observation Squadron was assigned directly to Far East Air Force Headquarters.

Notice was received by the group on 15 November that due to the tense international situation between the United States and the Empire of Japan, all pursuit aircraft on the flight line would be placed on alert 24 hours each day, be armed, fully fueled with pilots available on 30 minutes' notice. From 30 November to 6 December all squadrons underwent intensive training in day and night enemy interception and air-to-air gunnery.

=== Battle of the Philippines ===
On 8 December at about 03:30 the commercial radio station at Clark Field intercepted a message from Pearl Harbor, Hawaii about the Japanese attack there. However, the group was unable to verify this interception through official channels; no other action was taken other than notifying the Base Commander. However, all squadrons were put on alert.

At about 04:00 the radar at Iba Airfield on the north coast of Luzon reported a formation of unidentified aircraft approximately 75 miles off the West Coast of Luzon heading towards Corregidor. The 3d Pursuit Squadron was dispatched to intercept the formation, but no planes were sighted and the squadron returned to Iba. However, the radar tracks showed the interception was successful and the unidentified aircraft swung off to the west out of the range of the Radar. It was believed that the 3d went underneath the formation. At 04:45 notification was received of a state of war between the United States and the Empire of Japan.

At approximately 09:30, a large formation of Japanese bombers was spotted over Lingayen Gulf reported heading towards Manila. The 20th Pursuit Squadron from Clark Field was immediately dispatched to intercept the formation over Roselas. The 17th Pursuit Squadron was ordered from Nichols Field to cover the airspace over Clark. The interception was not successful, as the bombers turned to the northeast and attacked Baguio and Tagagarau then headed north off the radar. Both squadrons returned to their stations and were refueled and put back on alert.

Again at approximately 11:30 a large formation of bombers was reported over the China Sea heading towards Manila. P-40 Warhawks took off from Nichols Field to intercept enemy aircraft spotted on radar, but failed to make contact. In the afternoon, P-40s again took off from Nichols Field to patrol over Bataan and Manila. On 9 December shortly after midnight, telephonic communications were re-established with Headquarters, FEAF. Intelligence reported that an unidentified number of enemy aircraft were approaching from the north. A flight of six P-40s from the 17th Pursuit Squadron was dispatched from Del Carmen Field to intercept. However, two of the aircraft were demolished on takeoff due to an accident. The remaining planes proceeded to Nichols Field but were unable to accomplish any interception of enemy aircraft in the dark and the night bombing of Nichols Field began at 03:15. In order to try to bring some of the units up to strength, FEAF ordered the remainder of the 3d sent to Nichols Field to bring the 34th with its P-35s up to strength.

At the end of the 10th, Group fighter strength had been reduced to about 30 aircraft, with 8 being P-35s. Due to the depleted strength of the Group, orders were received from FEAF Headquarters that pursuit planes were not to be dispatched other than upon orders from Headquarters. The planes would be employed mainly as reconnaissance aircraft to replace the 2d Observation Squadron, which was made inoperable after being mostly destroyed on the ground. Its remaining planes were unarmed and sitting ducks if attacked.

On the morning of 23 December the Japanese made a landing in San Miguel Bay, along the east coast of Lingayen Gulf. The ground combat situation on Luzon quickly became desperate when a second set of major landings occurred along the shore of Lamon Bay in southern Luzon. With the landings, the units at Nichols and Clark field withdrew to dispersed bases on Luzon, and with General Douglas MacArthur's proclamation of Manila as an open city on 26 December, all FEAF personnel withdrew from Nichols Field. On the 28th Japanese forces occupied the airfield.

=== Japanese occupation ===
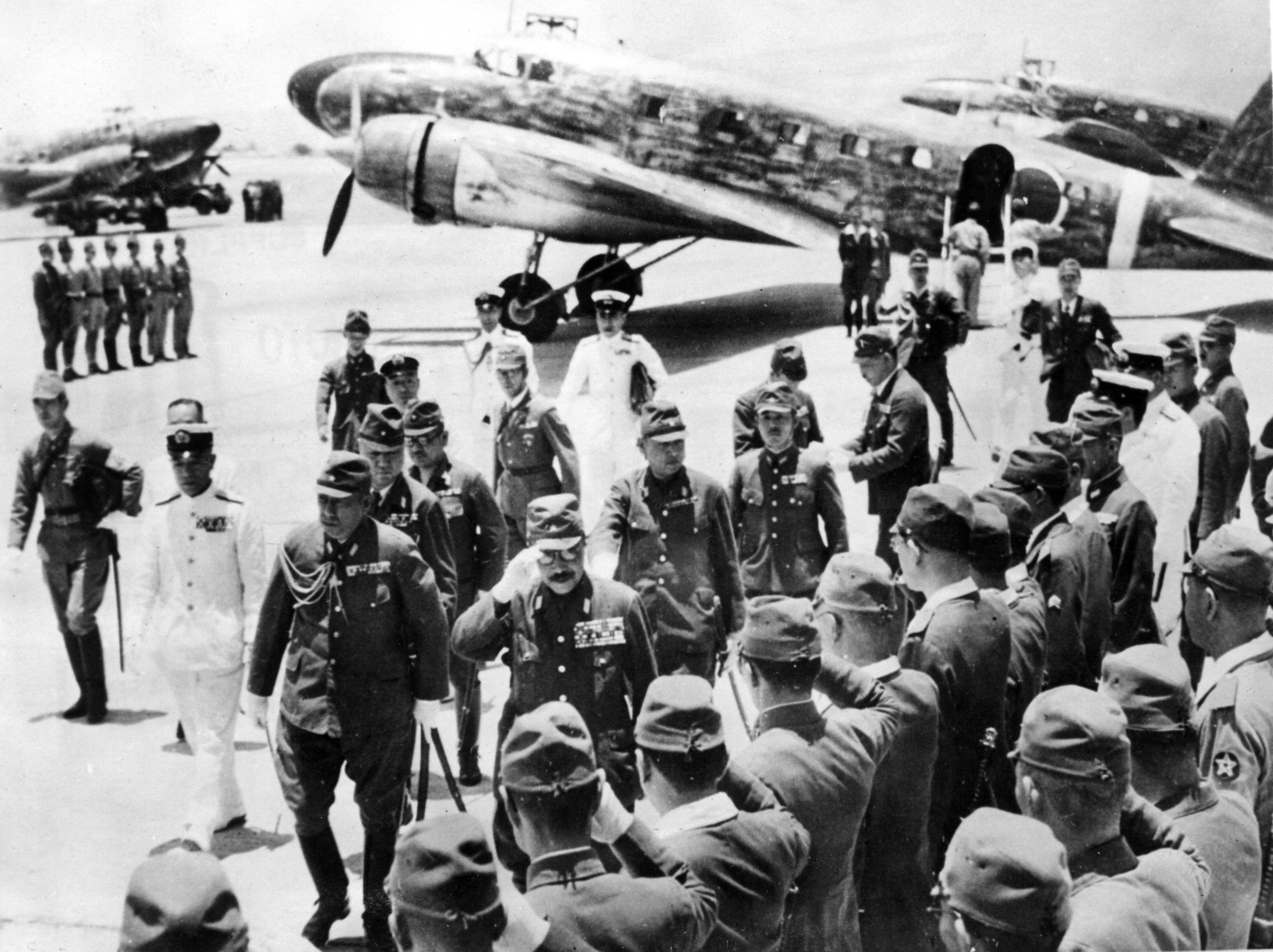
Japanese Prime Minister Hideki Tojo arrives at Nichols Field in 1943.

After its occupation, Nichols Field became a fighter base for the Imperial Japanese Navy Air Service. It was attacked on several occasions by FEAF fighters. On the night of 26/27 January 1942 Fighters from Bataan Airfield, bombed and strafed Nichols during the night inflicting considerable damage on Japanese aircraft and fuel storage. It was also attacked by B-17 Flying Fortresses from Australia, on 12 April 1942 staging though Del Monte Field on Mindanao.

After the capitulation of American forces in the Philippines, on 19 May 1942 the Japanese had American prisoner of war (POW) pilots fly two P-40 Warhawks and a PT-17 Stearman biplane from Davao Airfield to Nichols. One of the P-40s was delayed due to bad weather and landed at a small airstrip en route. It was used as a Prisoner of War Camp ("Philippine Military Prison Camp 306") and also used as a combat airfield by the IJNAS 1021st Kōkūtai flying Mitsubishi G4M medium bombers.

=== Battle of Nichols Field ===
After their defeat in the Battle of Leyte Gulf, the Japanese Navy reconstituted itself as a land force and positioned their naval guns in Fort Mckinley to halt the Allied advance on Luzon. The Japanese had transformed Fort Mckinley into one of the most heavily armed fortification of the Pacific War. The Japanese deployed their veteran Japanese Imperial Marines, naval troops and some kempeitai to muster some 3,000 troops to defend Fort Mckinley and Nichols Field.

The Fifth Air Force flew air attacks against Nichols Field in late January and during February 1945. During the Battle of Luzon, Nichols Field was recaptured by elements of the Sixth United States Army when paratroopers of the 11th Airborne Division attacked the base on 4 February. Four days' effort had effected little reduction in the amount of Japanese fire originating from the Nichols Field defenses. Support fires of Mindoro-based A-20s and the division's light artillery (75 mm pack howitzers and the short 105 mm howitzers) had not destroyed enough Japanese weapons to permit the infantry to advance without taking unduly heavy casualties. In fact, the volume of fire from Japanese naval guns of various types was still so great that one infantry company commander requested: "Tell Halsey to stop looking for the Jap Fleet. It's dug in on Nichols Field".

When direct communication began, the 11th Airborne Division and the XIV Corps quickly co-ordinated artillery fire plans and established a limit of fire line to demark their support zones about midway between Nichols Field and the Manila city limits. Under the provisions of this plan XIV Corps Artillery fired sixteen 155 mm and 8-inch howitzer concentrations in support of the airborne division's attack at Nichols Field before the division passed to XIV Corps control about 1300 on 10 February. For the time being, Griswold directed Swing, the 11th Airborne Division would continue to exert pressure against the Japanese at Nichols Field but would mount no general assault. Instead, the division would ascertain the extent and nature of the Japanese defenses at and east of the airfield and prepare to secure the Cavite naval base area, which the division had bypassed on its way north from Nasugbu. Further orders would be forthcoming once XIV Corps itself could learn more about the situation south of Manila.

The attack was preceded by artillery and mortar concentrations and by an air strike executed by Marine Corps SBD's from the Lingayen Gulf fields, support that succeeded in knocking out many Japanese artillery positions. The 2d Battalion, 187th Infantry, attacked generally east from the northwest corner of the field; the 188th Infantry and the 1st Battalion, 187th Infantry, drove in from the south and southeast. By dusk the two regiments had cleared most of the field and finished mopping up the next day.

Nichols Field was, however, by no means ready to receive Allied Air Force planes. Runways and taxiways were heavily mined, the runways were pitted by air and artillery bombardments, and the field was still subjected to intermittent artillery and mortar fire from the Fort McKinley area. At the airfield, many wrecked Japanese Navy and Army aircraft were captured, including several intact examples.

https://www.uswarmemorials.org/html/monument_details.php?SiteID=1684&MemID=2216

=== Japanese surrender and postwar use ===
Repaired, Nichols was used by the Air Transport Command (ATC) and Naval Air Transport Service (NATS).

On 19 August 1945, a sixteen-man Japanese delegation led by Japanese Lt. General Kanabe secretly left Kazarazu air base, Japan, in two Mitsubishi G4M "Betty" bombers, painted white with green crosses, as ordered by General MacArthur, to comply with the surrender of the Philippines at Manila. After landing at Nichols Field and met by General Sutherland, they surrendered their swords. During the initial meeting, the Japanese were instructed to have 400 trucks and 100 sedans at Atsugi Airfield, Japan, in readiness to receive the 11th Airborne as occupation forces. This caused much concern with the dignitaries. Atsugi had been a training base for kamikaze pilots and many of them were refusing to surrender. There were also 300,000 well-trained troops on the Kanto Plain of Tokyo, so MacArthur moved the landing for the 11th A/B to 28 August; five days later than originally planned.

During 1945–1946 the 6th Troop Carrier Squadron (Jan-May 1946); 13th Troop Carrier Squadron (June–October 1946) and 22d Troop Carrier Squadrons (October 1946-April 1947) operated C-47 Skytrains from Nichols Field. Also a NATS detachment of six officers operated DC-3 transports was based at Nichols.

=== Philippine independence ===
After Philippine independence, on 4 July 1946, the US surrendered to the Republic of the Philippines all rights of possession, jurisdiction, supervision and control over the Philippine territory except the use of their military bases. Nichols Field later became the headquarters of the Philippine Air Force. First named Nichols Air Base, it is now named Villamor Air Base. The base shares its site with Ninoy Aquino International Airport, which was transferred from Grace Park Airfield in Caloocan and Nielson Airport in Makati (as Manila Airport).

As of the present, the names Nichols, Nichols Field, along with Villamor, are used as accepted nicknames or codenames for the area surrounding it. Commonly, Nichols is still used to refer to the broader or entire aerodrome complex that includes both the airport and the adjacent Villamor Air Base.

== See also ==
- Villamor Air Base
- Ninoy Aquino International Airport
- Geography of the Philippines
- Military History of the Philippines
- Military History of the United States
- United States Army Air Forces in the South West Pacific Theatre
