= Iba Airfield =

Former military airfield in Luzon, Philippines

Coordinates: 15°19′38.28″N 119°58′0.84″E

Iba Airfield
- Part of Fifth Air Force
- Luzon, Philippines
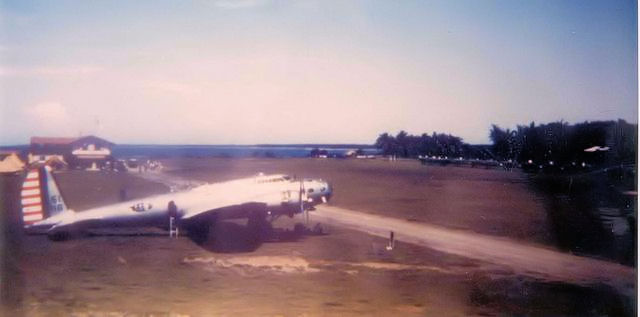
- Rare color photo taken of one of the first B-17Ds in the Philippines, October 1941, Iba Field. Nine B-17s from Hawaii arrived shortly before.

Site information
- Type: Military airfield
- Controlled by: United States Army Air Forces

Site history
- Built: 1930s
- In use: 1940–1941 (Occupied by the Japanese, December 1941 – January 1945)
- Battles/wars: Battle of the Philippines (1942)

Iba Airfield is a former United States Army Air Forces airfield on Luzon in the Philippines. It was overrun by the Imperial Japanese Army during the Battle of the Philippines (1942), it was struck in an air raid at same time as the attack on Clark Field on 8 December 1941.

== History ==
The airfield was a former training camp for the Philippine Constabulary on the western coast of Luzon in Zambales province. In the summer of 1941, it was placed in use by the Americans as a gunnery training field for pursuit (fighter) units. The Far East Air Force sent the 3d Pursuit Squadron, 24th Pursuit Group to Iba for aerial gunnery training in its new P-40E Warhawks in mid-October, where it was when war broke out on 8 December 1941. In addition to the pursuit planes, the first operational SCR-270 mobile early-warning radar was deployed to the airfield at the same time. Iba was a grass field with few support facilities.

The first word of the Japanese attack on Pearl Harbor was received by commercial radio between 0300–0330 hours local. Within 30 minutes radar at Iba Field, Luzon plotted a formation of airplanes 75 miles (120 km) offshore, heading for Corregidor Island. P-40s were sent out to intercept but made no contact. By 1130 hours, the fighters sent into the air earlier landed for refuelling, and radar disclosed another flight of Japanese aircraft 70 miles (112 km) West of Lingayen Gulf, headed south. Fighters from Iba Field made another fruitless search over the South China Sea. The P-40s sent on patrol of the South China Sea returned to Iba with fuel running low at the beginning of a Japanese attack on the airfield. The P-40s failed to prevent bombing but did manage to contest the low-level strafing of the sort which proved so destructive at Clark Field soon after. The radar set at Iba, however, was destroyed in the attack and the 3rd PS decimated.

On 9 December, the remnants of the 3d Pursuit Squadron relocated to Nichols Field. The airfield was abandoned by the USAAF about 20 December prior to it being overrun by the invading Imperial Japanese Army. After its occupation, it was used by Japanese aircraft as a satellite field for the Clark area.

== See also ==
- Geography of the Philippines
- Military History of the Philippines
- Military History of the United States
- United States Army Air Forces in the South West Pacific Theatre

== Images ==
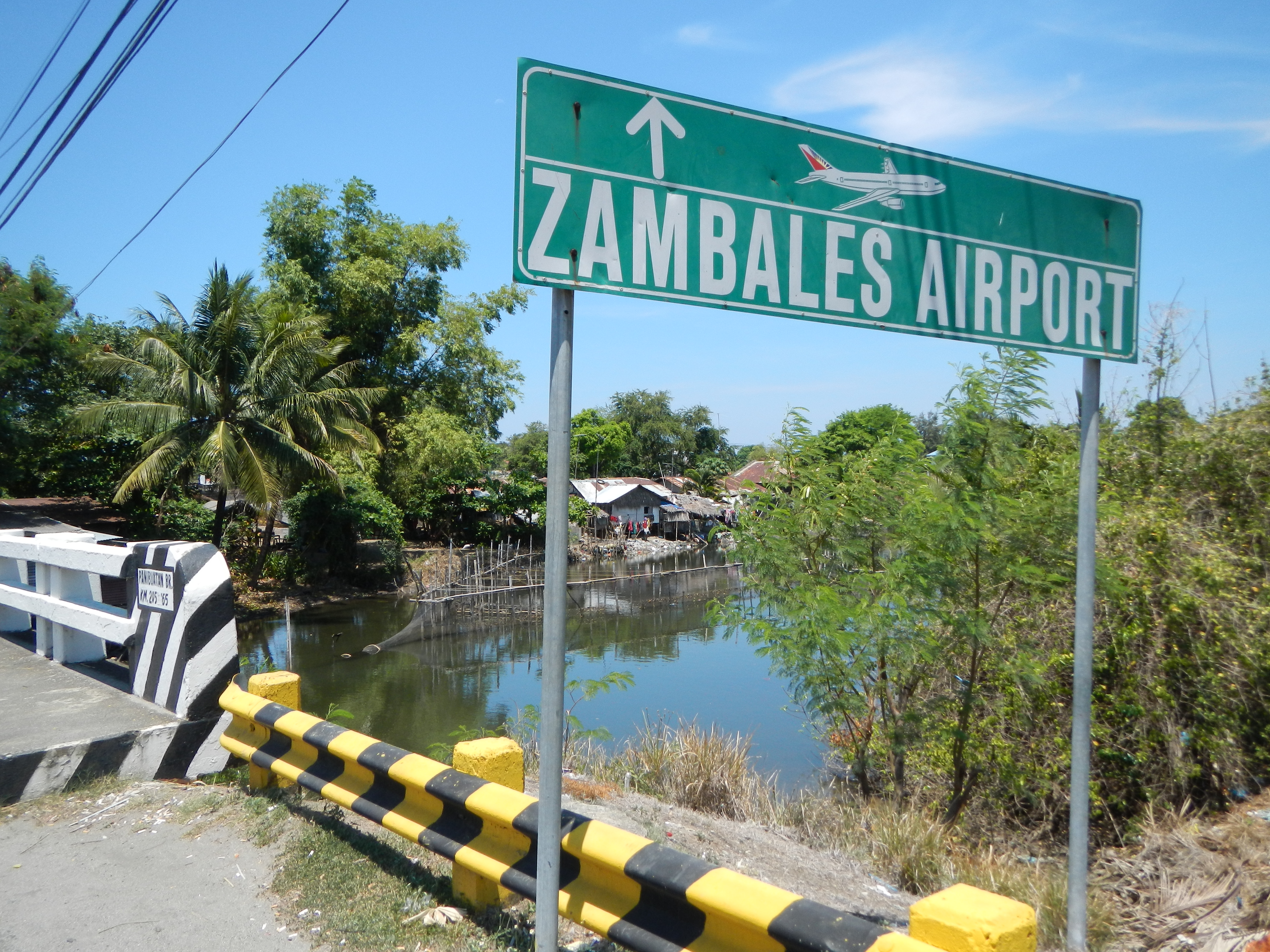
Highway sign

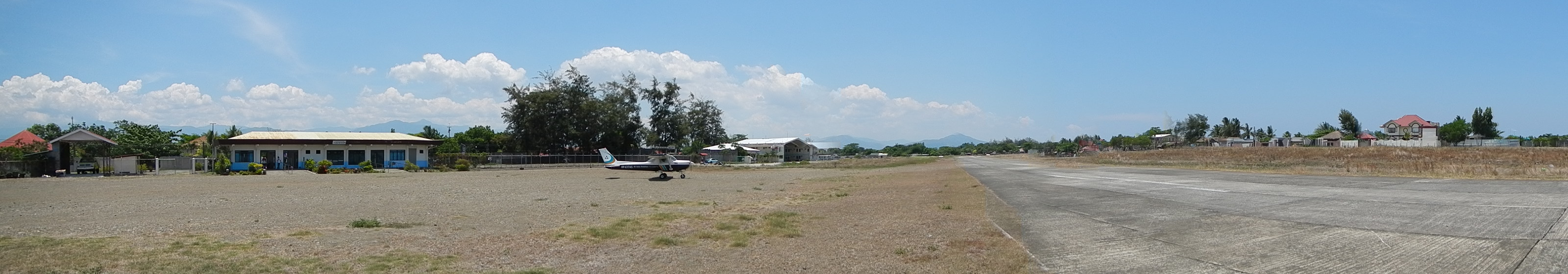
Runway of Iba, Zambales Airport panorama

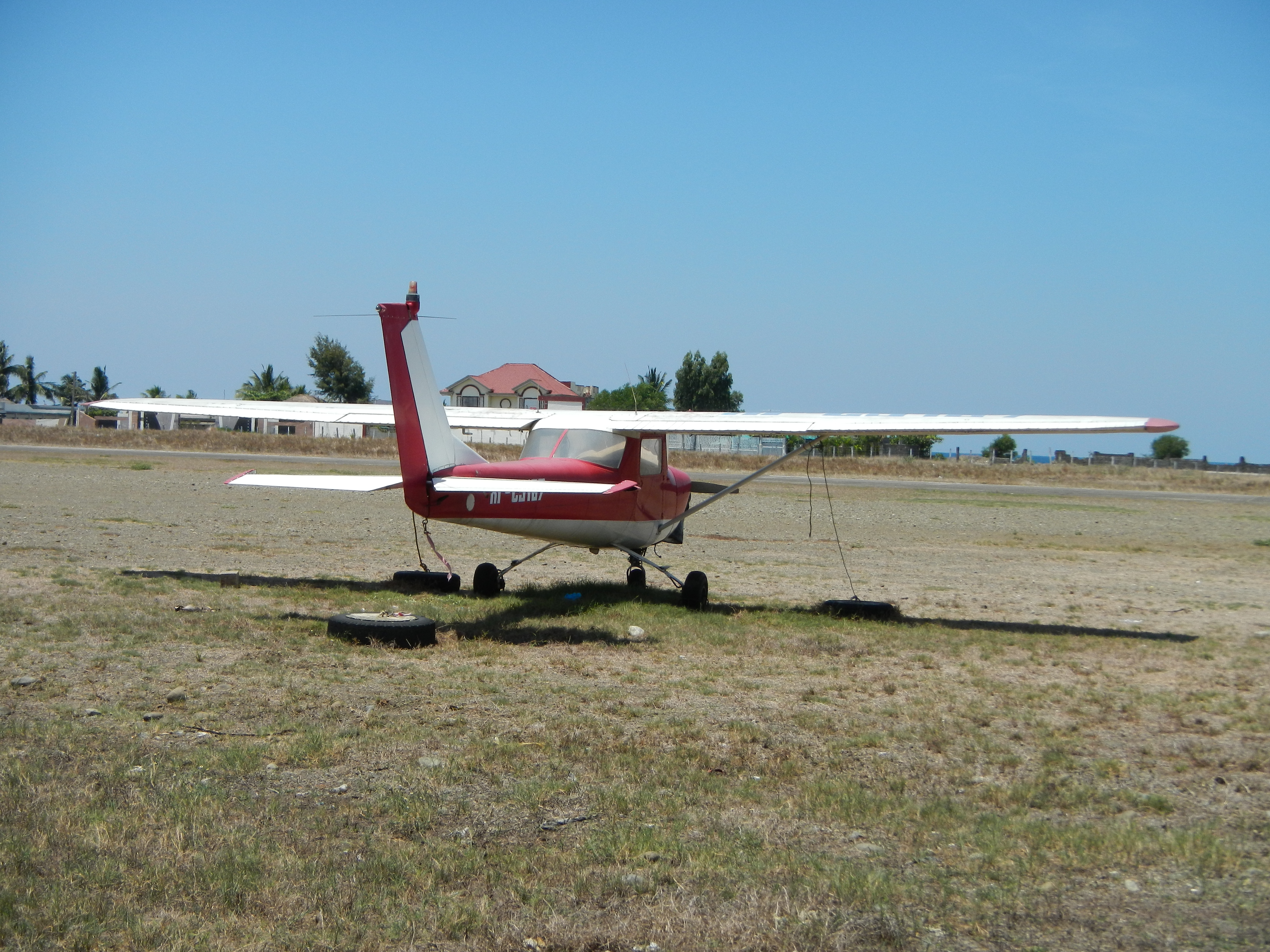
Aviation school plane

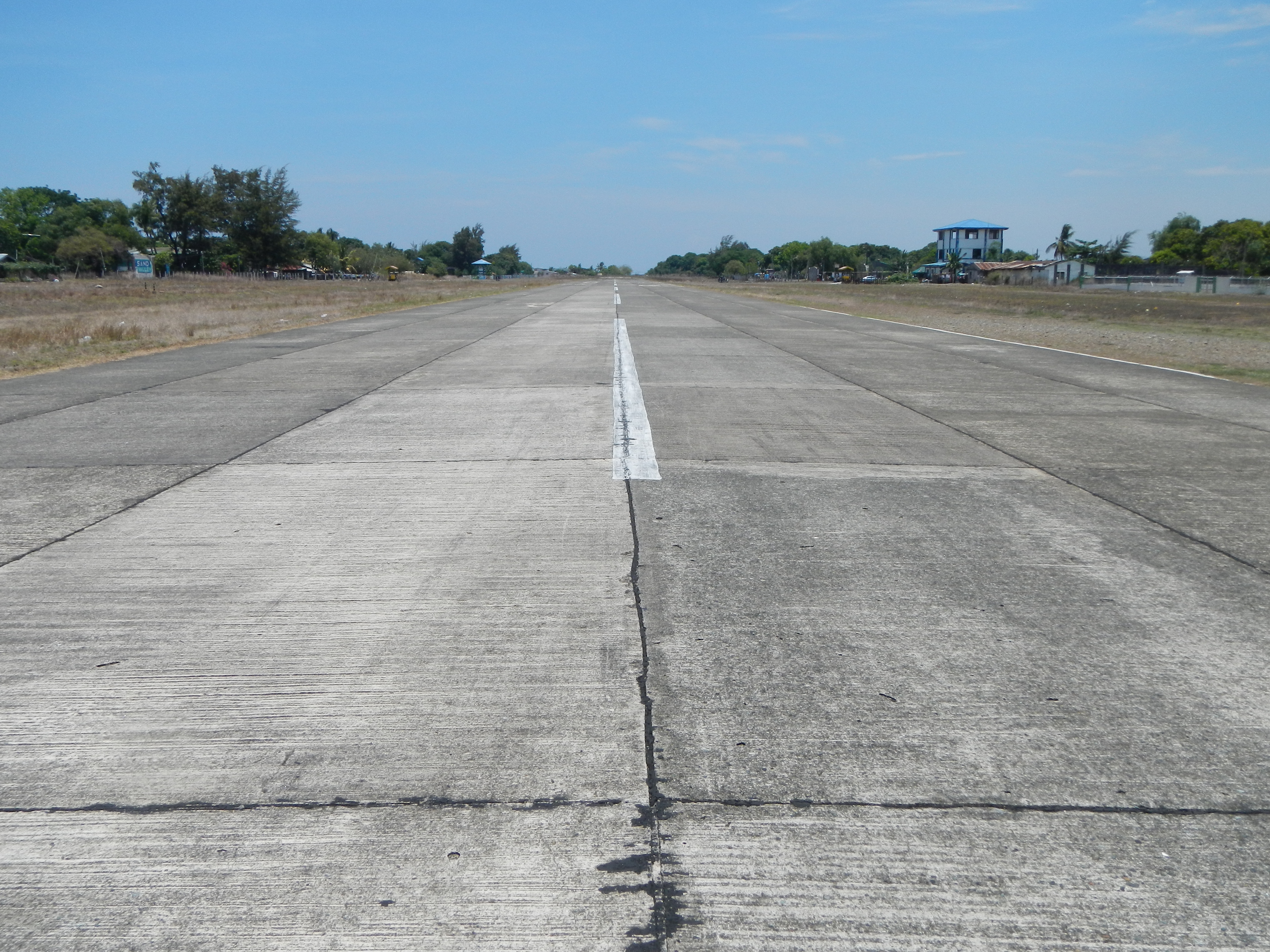
The short runway

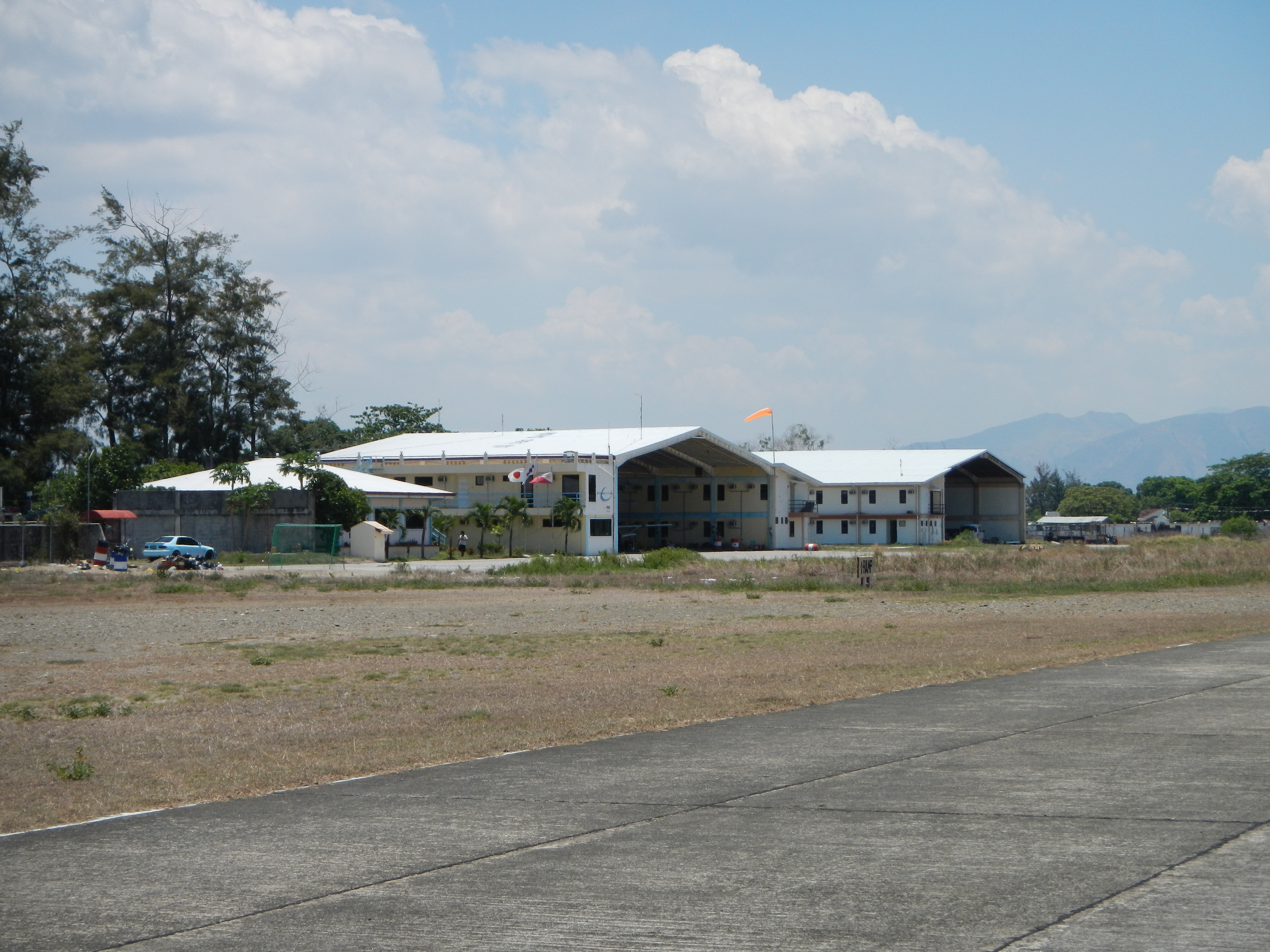
Aviation schools with parked training planes

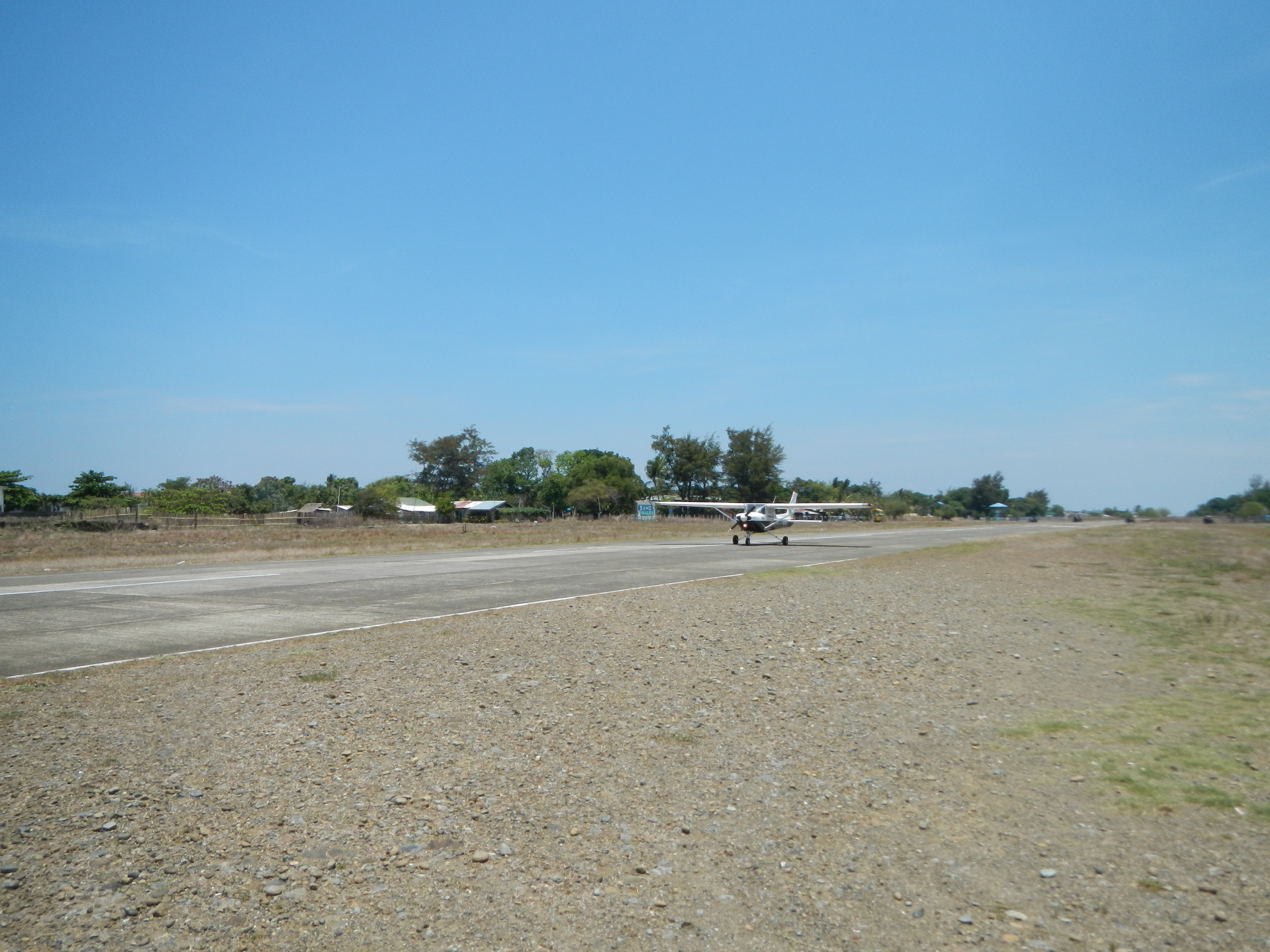
Descending plane of student pilot with professor

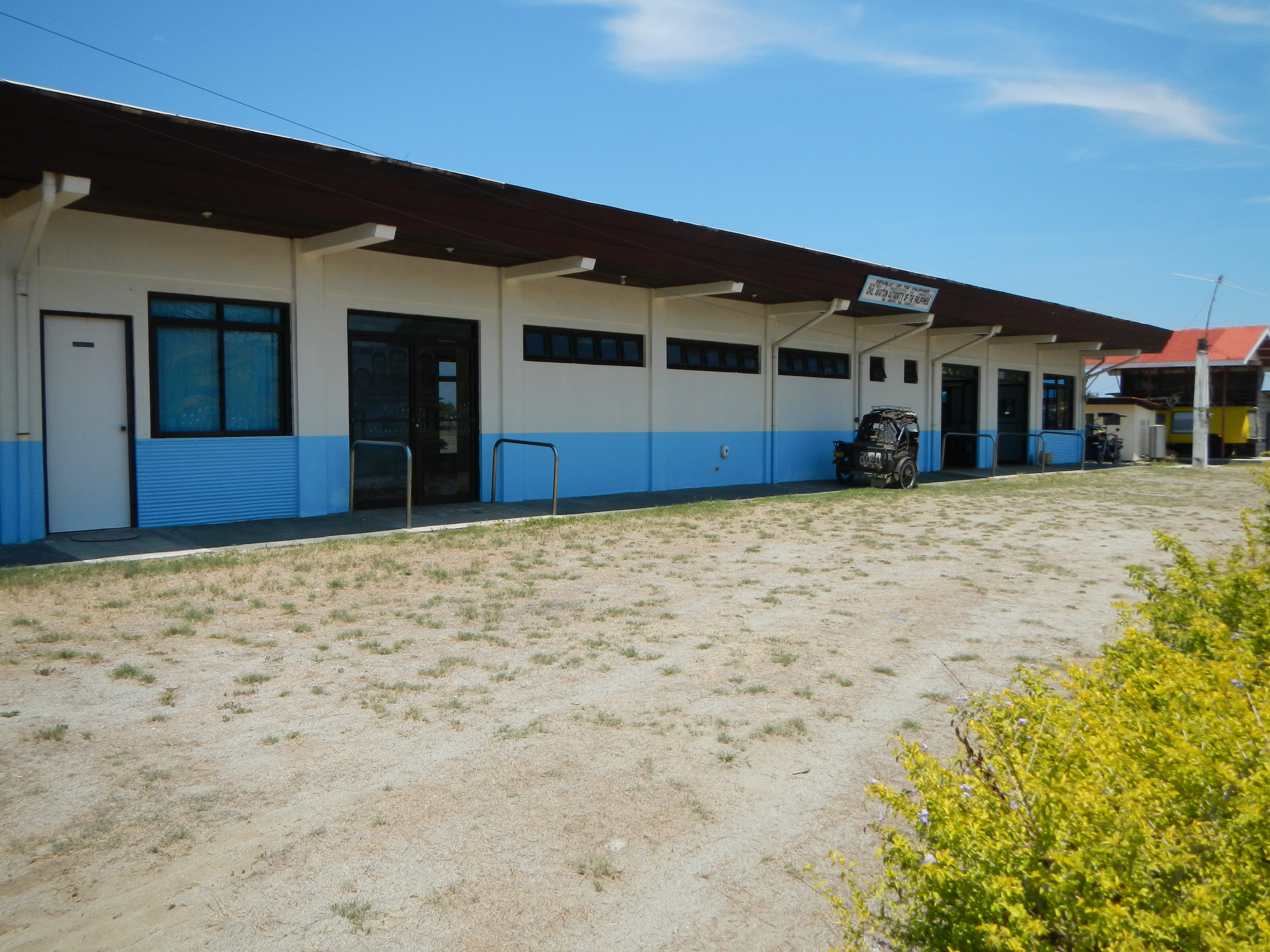
Civil Aviation Authority of the Philippines office in the center of the Iba Airport and Airfield
