= 10th Fighter Wing =

- Active: 1 October 1942 – 1 December 1943
- Disbanded: 1 December 1943
- Country: United States
- Allegiance: United States Air Force
- Role: Fighter Command and Control

The 10th Fighter Wing was a unit of the United States Army Air Forces. Its last assignment was with the Fourth Air Force, based at Hamilton Army Airfield, California. It was inactivated on 1 December 1943.

== History ==
Assigned to Fourth Air Force as prewar Pursuit Wing, remained active at Hamilton Field, California until 1 December 1943.

=== Lineage ===
- Constituted as 10th Pursuit Wing on 1 December 1940

Activated on 10 December 1940
Inactivated on 7 December 1941.

- Redesignated 10th Fighter Wing and activated on 1 October 1942

Inactivated on 1 May 1943

- Disbanded on 1 December 1943

=== Assignments ===
- Southwest Air District (later 4th Air Force), 10 December 1940 – 1 May 1943.

=== Stations ===
- Hamilton Field, California, 10 December 1940 – 1 May 1943

=== Components ===
- 20th Fighter Group, 18 December 1940 – 1 October 1941
- 35th Fighter Group, 9 December 1941 – 12 January 1942
