= Edwin A. Doss =

American fighter pilot (1914-1996)

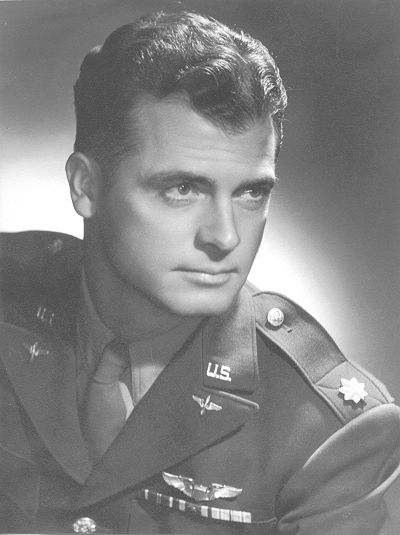
- Doss during his tenure as a lieutenant colonel.
- Born: September 14, 1914; Rector, Arkansas, U.S.
- Died: January 7, 1996 (aged 81); Riverside, California, U.S.
- Burial place: Riverside National Cemetery
- Military career
- Allegiance: United States of America
- Branch: United States Army; United States Air Force
- Service years: 1940–1968
- Rank: Colonel
- Commands: 41st Pursuit Squadron; 35th Fighter Group; 27th Fighter Group; 49th Fighter Bomber Wing; 3rd Bomb Wing; Bangor Air Defense Sector
- Conflicts: World War II; South West Pacific theatre; Korean War
- Awards: Legion of Merit (2); Distinguished Flying Cross (2); Air Medal (3); Eulji Order of Military Merit

Edwin A. Doss (September 14, 1914 – January 7, 1996) was an American fighter pilot and commander in the U.S. Air Force during World War II and Korean War. Logging more than 4,500 flying hours, Doss flew 573 combat hours and accrued 280 combat missions during his leadership in the South West Pacific Theatre and Korean War. For his two-year service as commander of the 35th Fighter Group during World War II, Doss was awarded the Distinguished Flying Cross, Legion of Merit, and the Air Medal. He received his second Legion of Merit and the Korean Ulchi medal with a Silver Star for his assignments as commander of the 49th Fighter Bomber Wing and the 3rd Bomber Wing at Kunsan, Korea. Colonel Doss's service has been cited as integral to the development of long-range fighter tactics in the South West Pacific Theater.

After the Korean War, Doss held assignments including senior Air Force advisor to the Pennsylvania Air National Guard, Vice Commander of the 85th Air Division (Air Defense) at Andrews Air Force Base, and Deputy Commander of the Washington Air Defense Sector at Fort Lee, Virginia. In 1963, Doss was assigned to the United States Air Forces in Europe (USAFE) headquarters as Deputy Inspector General and Inspector General. In 1964, he was appointed as head of the command liaison agency to the government of France at Paris. He retired from the Air Force in 1968. He died in 1996 at age 81 in Riverside, California, and was buried at the Riverside National Cemetery.

== Early life and education ==
Edwin Allen Doss was born in Rector, Arkansas. He later moved to Missouri where he graduated from Portageville High School in 1932. He spent the next two years in the Civilian Conservation Corps before attending Lead Belt Junior College in Desloge, Missouri. He graduated in 1936.

== Career ==
=== Early military years (1940–1941) ===
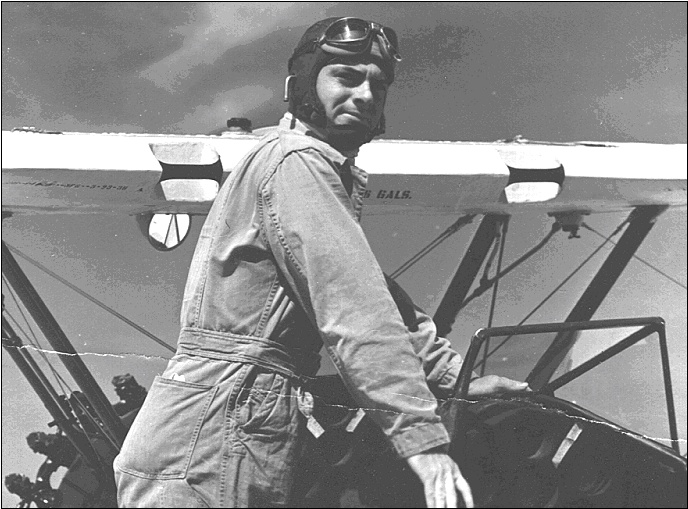
Aviation Cadet Doss

After being commissioned as a second lieutenant on December 20, 1940, Doss's first military assignment was to the 41st squadron of the 31st Operations Group at Selfridge Field, Michigan. There, he flew Seversky P-35 aircraft. In April 1941, he was appointed squadron operations officer.

On April 9, 1941, Doss's P-35 crashed due to mechanical failure in Selfridge Field. The plane was severely damaged.

=== World War II ===
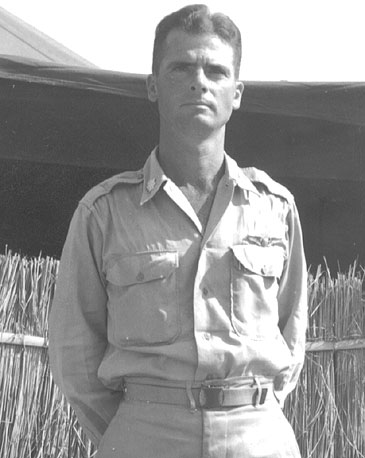
Lt. Col. Edwin A. Doss

In January 1942, Doss and his squadron were deployed to Port Moresby, New Guinea in the South West Pacific Theatre. In June of that year, he was appointed commander of the 41st Pursuit Squadron, and by 1943, he was a major in the United States Army Air Corps.

In August 1943, Doss became commander of the 35th Fighter Group, and in November, Doss was promoted to lieutenant colonel. In 1944, under Doss's command the 35th Fighter Group set a record for the longest fighter mission in the South West Pacific Theater. After, the 35th Fighter Group continued into the Philippines. Under Doss's leadership, the group held a combat score of 397 victories and was the first fighter squadron to reach the Japanese mainland.

After leading the 35th Fighter Group through the South West Pacific Theater from Lae, New Guinea to Okinawa, Japan, Doss was promoted to colonel in 1945.

Doss's leadership as commander has been commended as integral to the advancement of long-range fighter tactics in the South West Pacific Theater. His strategic leadership received mention in a booklet that was published by World War II combat pilots of the South West Pacific.

=== Korean War ===
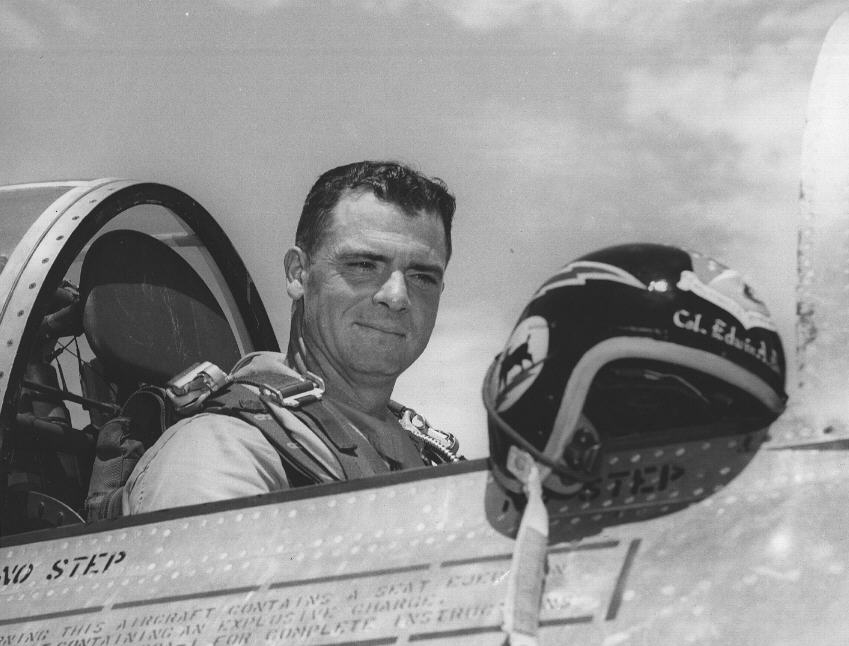
Colonel Edwin A. Doss

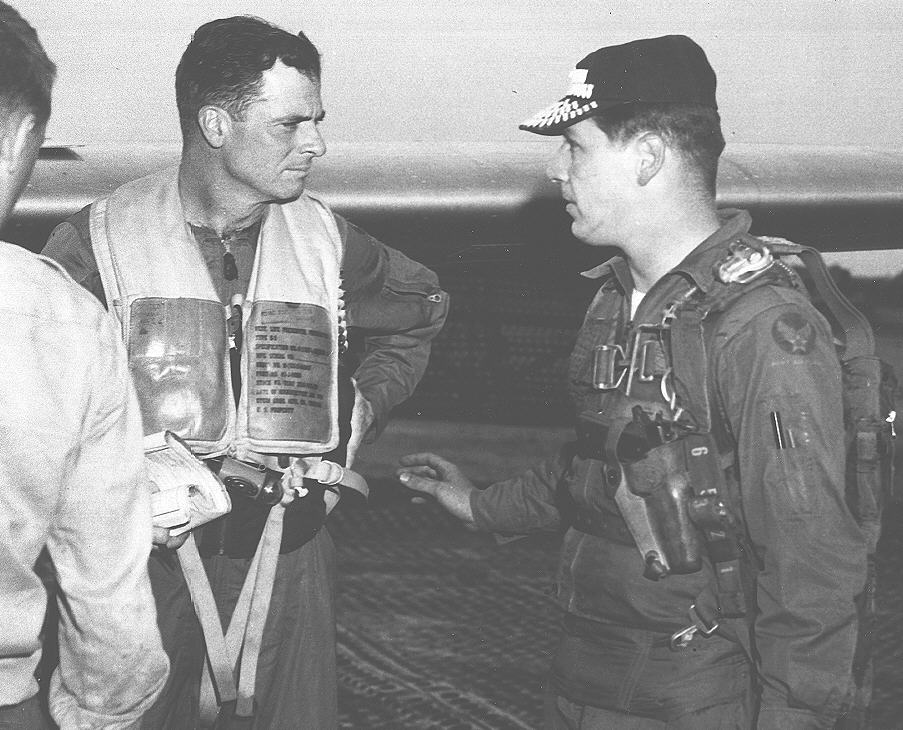
Col. Doss (left) after mission

In March 1953, Doss was appointed as Commander of the 49th Fighter Wing at Kunsan, South Korea, where he flew a F-84G. As a combat commander, he led the 49th Fighter Bomber Wing and then the 3rd Bombardment Wing, both at Kunsan, through the end of the Korean War. He returned to the United States in April 1954.

=== Later military years (1954–1968) ===
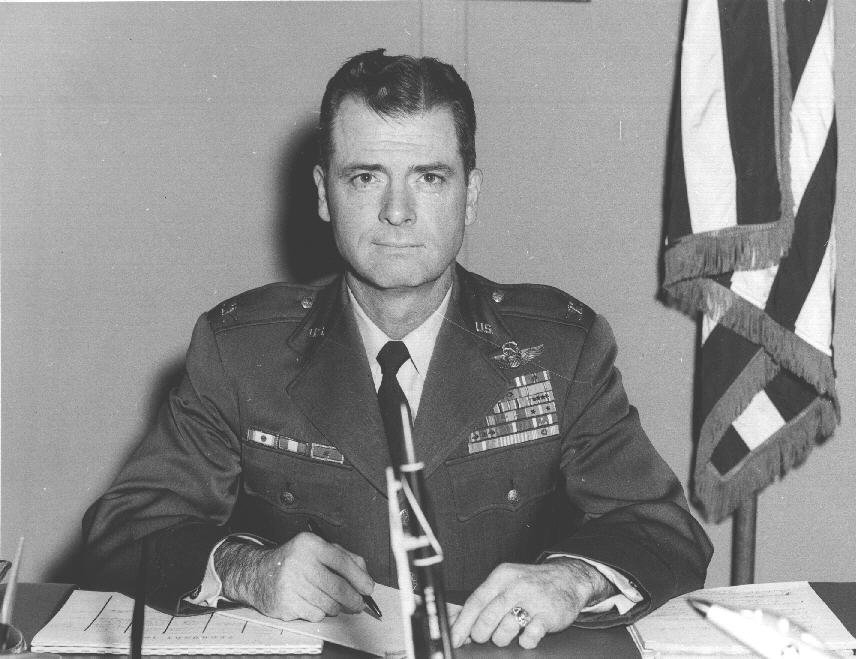
Colonel Doss

After returning to the United States, Doss was appointed as senior Air Force advisor to the Pennsylvania Air National Guard. His next assignment was as vice commander of the 85th Air Defense Division at Andrews Air Force Base. He then served as deputy commander of the Washington Air Defense Sector at Fort Lee, Virginia until 1960, when he was appointed commander of the Bangor Air Defense Sector. While serving as commander of the Bangor Air Defense Sector, he held the position of commander of the Bangor North American Air Defense Sector.

In 1963, Doss was appointed deputy inspector general and inspector general of the United States Air Forces in Europe (USAFE) headquarters. He served as head of the command liaison agency to the government of France at Paris from 1964 until 1966, and then deputy commander of the 25th Air Division at McChord Air Force Base until he retired from the Air Force in 1968.

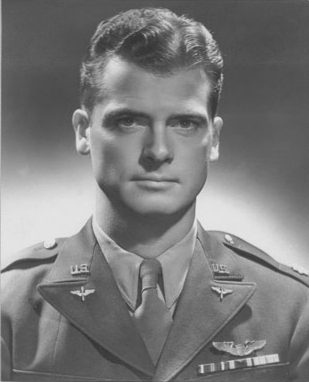
Edwin A. Doss

== Education ==
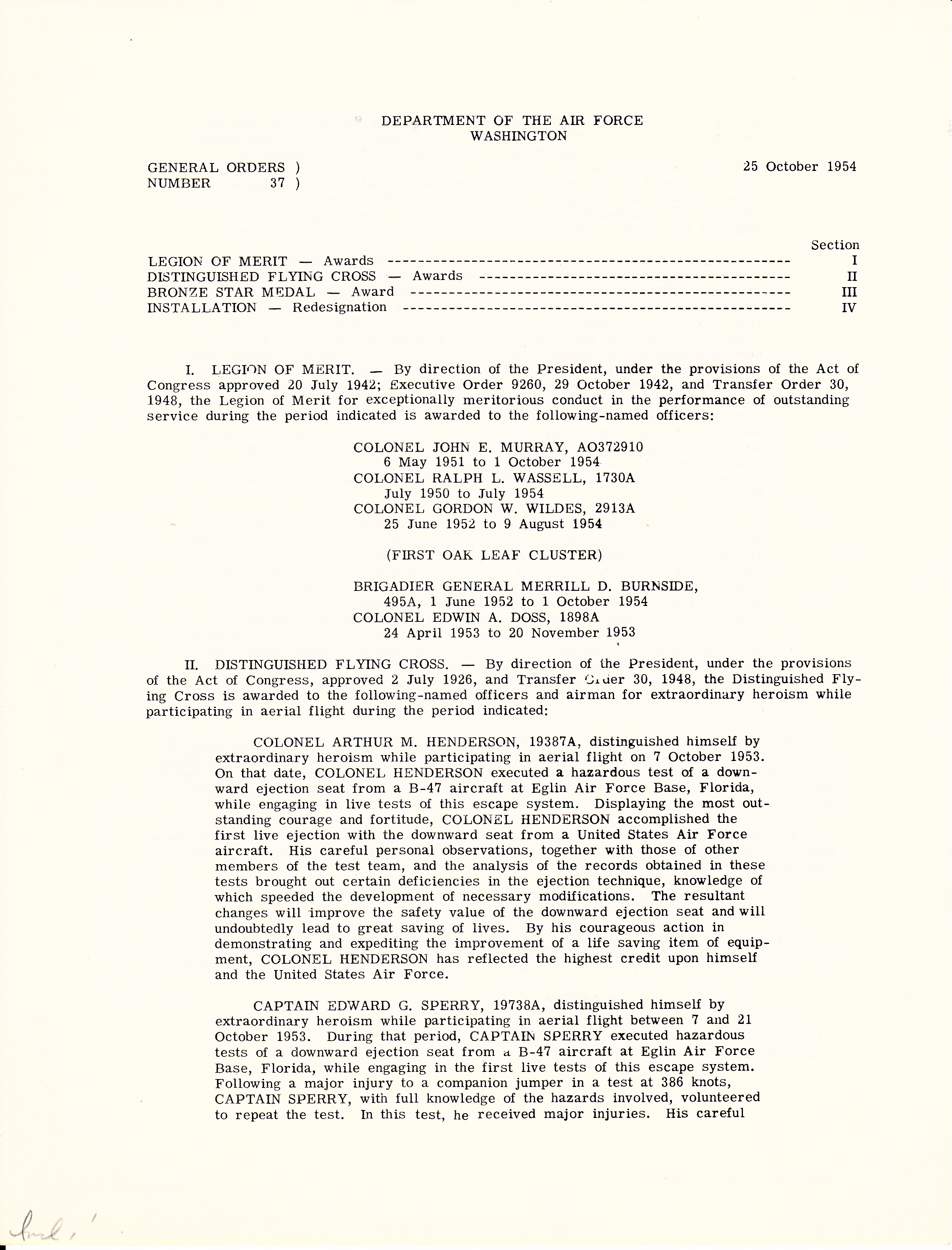
General Orders 37 Secretary of the Air Force Oct. 25, 1954 Page 1

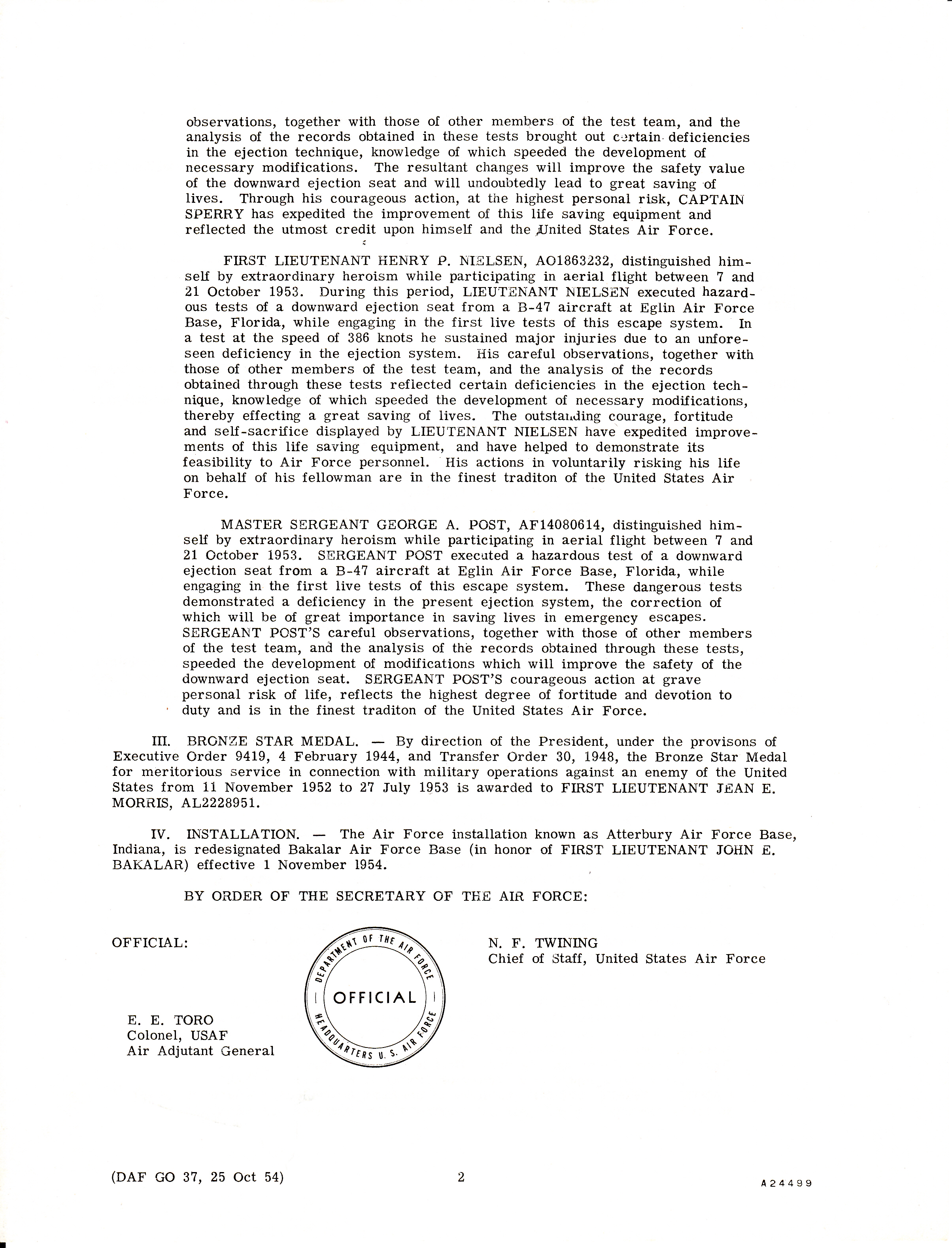
General Orders 37 Secretary of the Air Force Oct. 25, 1954 Page 2

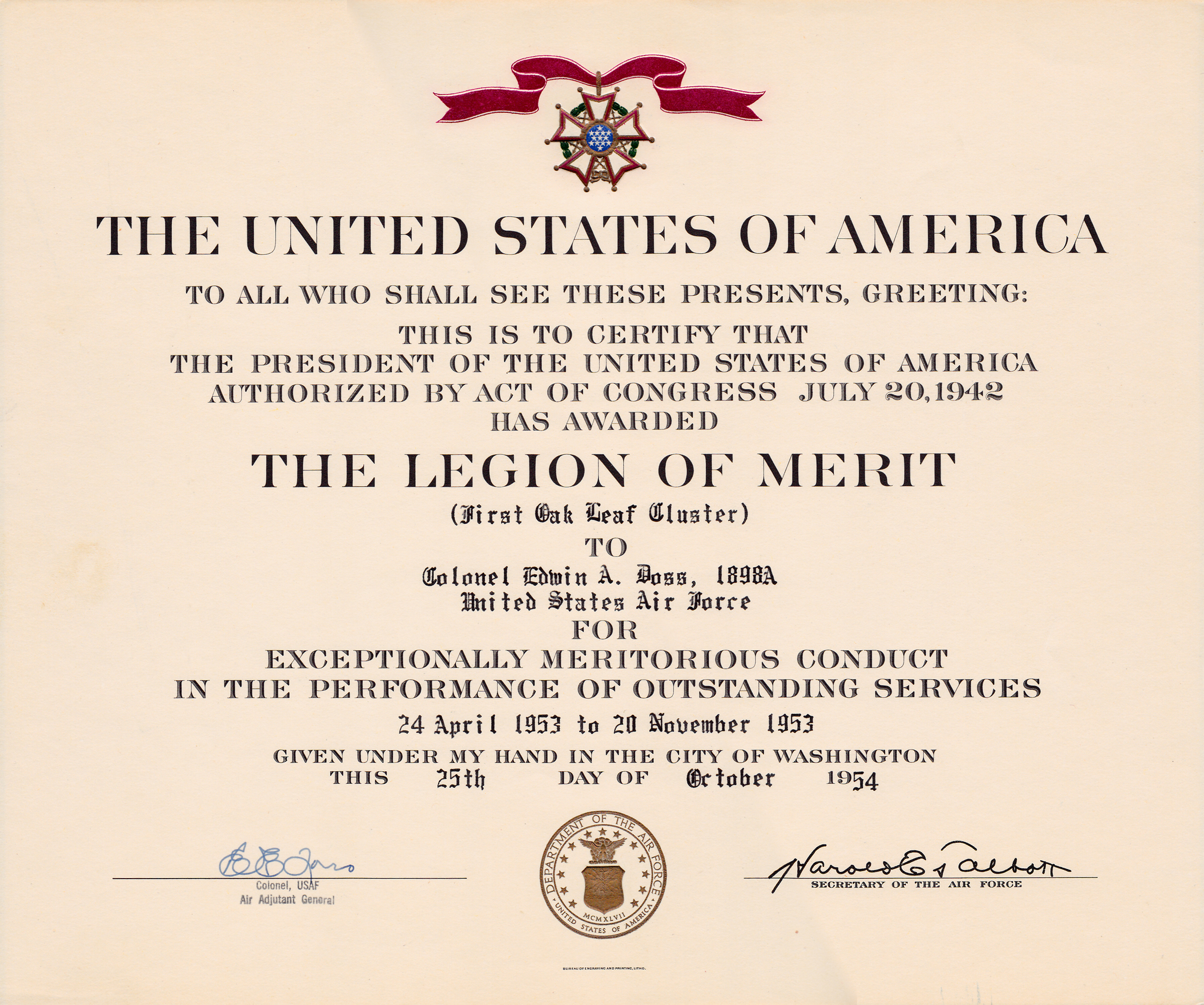
Col. Edwin A. Doss Legion of Merit October 25, 1954

- 1932 Graduate, Portageville High School
- 1936 Graduate, Lead Belt Junior College
- 1938 Student, University of Southern California
- 1940 United States Army Air Corps Flying School
- 1945 Command and General Staff School
- 1947 Basic Military Management
- 1948 Air Command and Staff School
- 1954 Graduate, University of Maryland
- 1958 National War College, Fort Lesley J. McNair, Washington, D.C.

== Assignments ==
1.	Apr 1940 – Dec 1940	Aviation cadet
2.	Dec 1940 – Jun 1941	Commissioned second lieutenant and pilot in 41st Pursuit Squadron at Selfridge Field, Michigan.
3.	Jun 1941 – Jun 1942	Operations officer, 41st Pursuit Squadron, Selfridge Field Michigan, and Port Moresby, New Guinea.
4.	Jun 1942 – Aug 1943	Squadron commander, 41st Fighter Squadron, Port Moresby, New Guinea.
5.	Aug 1943 – Sep 1945	Group commander, 35th Fighter Group, Port Moresby, New Guinea, Okinawa.
6.	Sep 1945 – Feb 1946	Command and General Staff School, Fort Leavenworth, Kansas
7.	Feb 1946 – Mar 1947	Deputy air inspector, Fifteenth Air Force, Colorado Springs, Colorado
8.	Mar 1947 – Aug 1947	Chief of staff, 62nd Fighter Wing, Selfridge Field, Michigan
9.	Aug 1947 – Jul 1948	Group commander, 27th Fighter Group, Kearney, Nebraska
10.	Jul 1948 – Jan 1949	Air Command and Staff School, Maxwell Air Force Base, Alabama
11.	Jan 1949 – Jul 1950	Deputy for Reserve Forces Headquarters, Tenth Air Force, Selfridge Air Force Base, Michigan
12.	Jul 1950 – Jun 1951	Senior Air Force advisor, 66th Fighter Wing, Illinois Air National Guard
13.	Jun 1951 – Feb 1953	Air Force member (Air Defense) of the Weapons Systems Evaluation Group, Headquarters USAF Office of the Secretary of Defense
14.	Feb 1953 – Apr 1953	Student officer, Jet Transition Course, Craig Air Force Base, Alabama
15.	Apr 1953 – Dec 1953	Wing commander, 49th Fighter Bomber Wing, K-8, Kunsan, Korea
16.	Dec 1953 – May 1954	Wing commander, 3rd Bomb Wing, K-8, Kunsan, Korea
17.	May 1954 – Aug 1957	Senior Air Force advisor to the Pennsylvania Air National Guard
18.	Aug 1957 – Jul 1958	Student at the National War College Washington, D. C.
19.	Jul 1958 – May 1959	Vice commander, 85th Air Division, Andrews Air Force Base, Maryland
20.	May 1959 – Apr 1960	Deputy commander, Washington Air Defense Sector, Fort Lee, Virginia
21.	Apr 1960 – Jul 1963	Commander, Bangor Air Defense Sector, Brunswick, Maine
22.	Jul 1963 – Jul 1964	Deputy inspector general and inspector general, Headquarters USAFE
23.	Jul 1964 – Jun 1966	USAFE French Liaison Office, Paris, France
24.	Jun 1966 – Jul 1968	Deputy commander, 25th Air Division, McChord Air Force Base, Tacoma, Washington

== Flight information ==
- Rating: Command Pilot
- Flight hours: More than 4,500
- Aircraft flown: P-47, P-51, and F-84G

== Awards and decorations ==

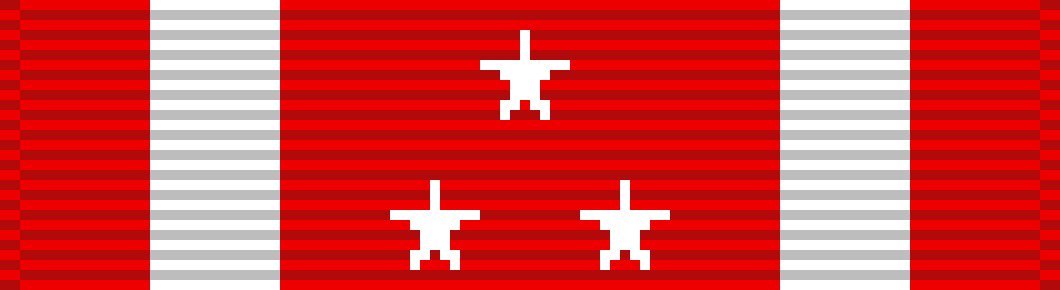

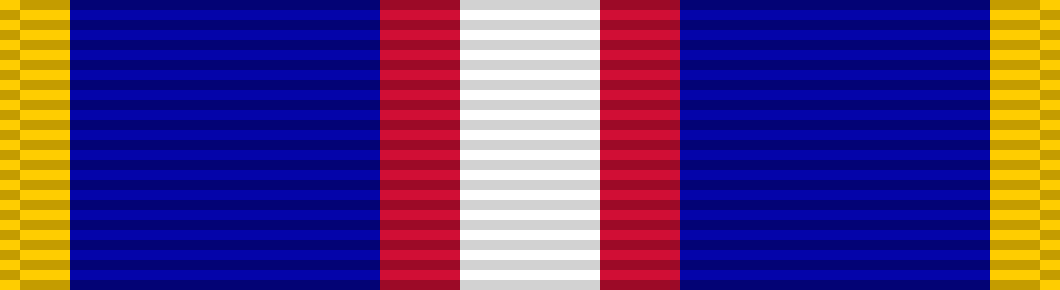

Badge	US Air Force Command Pilot Badge		
1st row	Legion of Merit with 1 Oak leaf cluster		Distinguished Flying Cross with 1 Oak leaf cluster
2nd row	Air Medal with 2 Oak leaf clusters	Army Commendation Medal	Presidential Unit Citation with 1 Oak leaf cluster
3rd row	Air Force Outstanding Unit Award	American Defense Service Medal	American Campaign Medal
4th row	Asiatic-Pacific Campaign Medal with 9 Campaign stars	World War II Victory Medal	National Defense Service Medal with 1 Service star
5th row	Korean Service Medal with 2 Campaign stars	Air Force Longevity Service Ribbon with 5 Oak leaf clusters	Philippine Defense Medal
6th row	Philippine Liberation Medal	Philippine Independence Medal	Philippine Presidential Unit Citation
7th row	Korean Presidential Unit Citation	United Nations Service Medal Korea	Korean War Service Medal
Badge	Secretary of Defense Identification Badge		

Eulji Cordon Medal

== Effective dates of promotion ==
Insignia	Rank	Temporary	Permanent
	Second Lieutenant	December 20, 1940	December 20, 1940
	First lieutenant	June 1, 1942	September 14, 1942
	Captain	October 15, 1942	
	Major	March 4, 1943	
	Lieutenant colonel	November 28, 1943	July 1, 1948
	Colonel	March 21, 1945	July 2, 1954

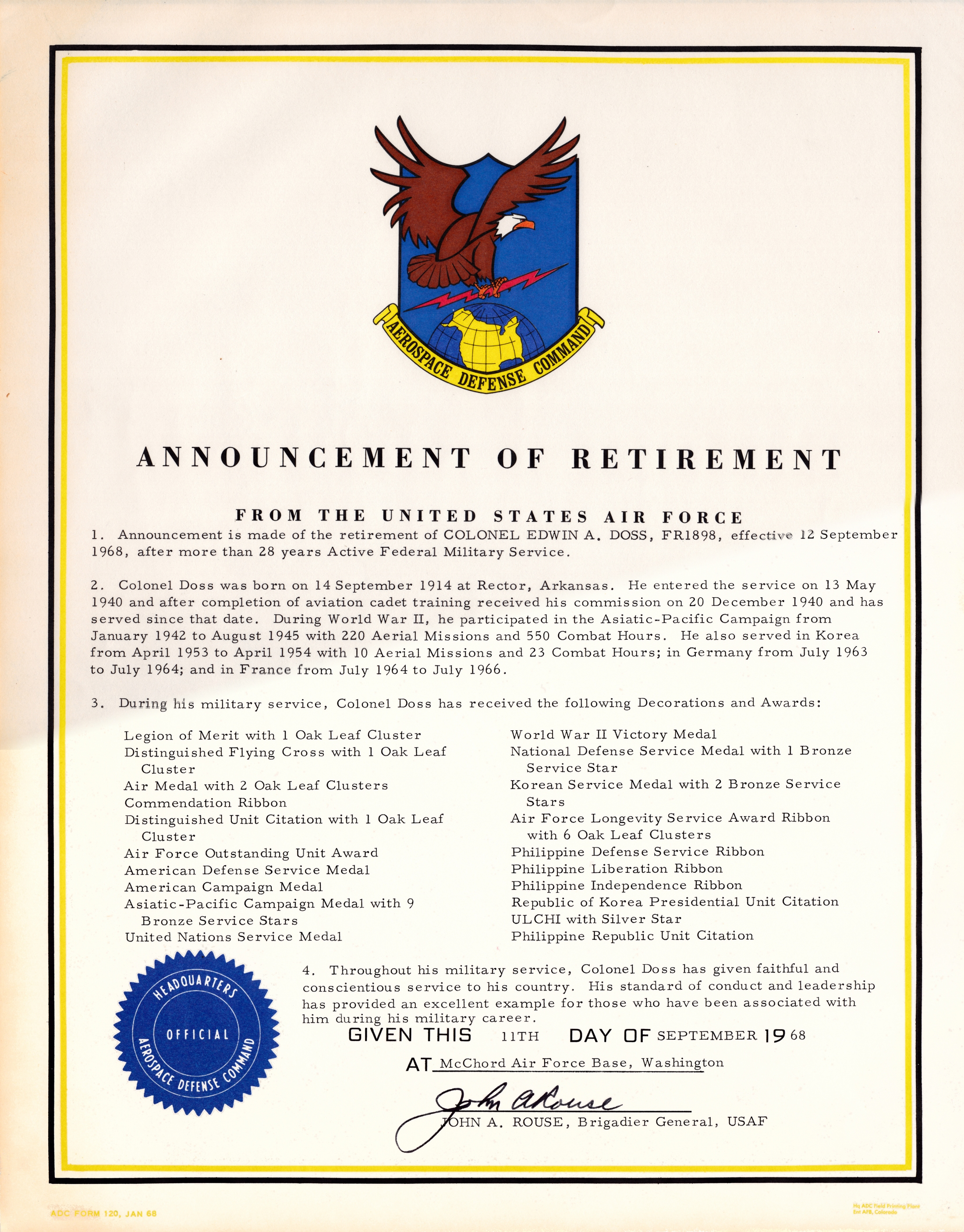
Announcement of Retirement for Col. Edwin A. Doss September 11, 1968

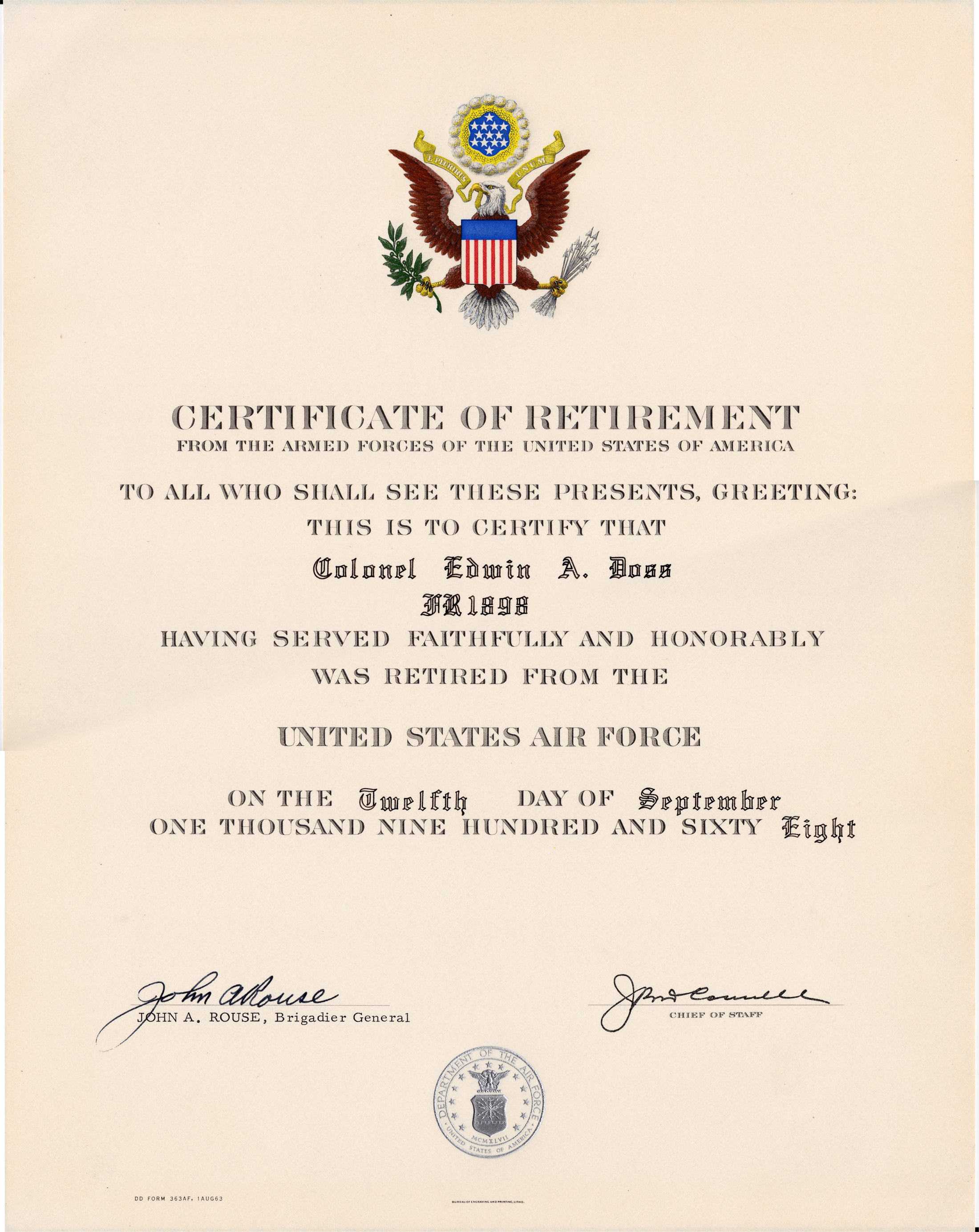
Certificate of Retirement for Col. Edwin A. Doss September 12, 1968
