= 49th Wing =

49th Wing

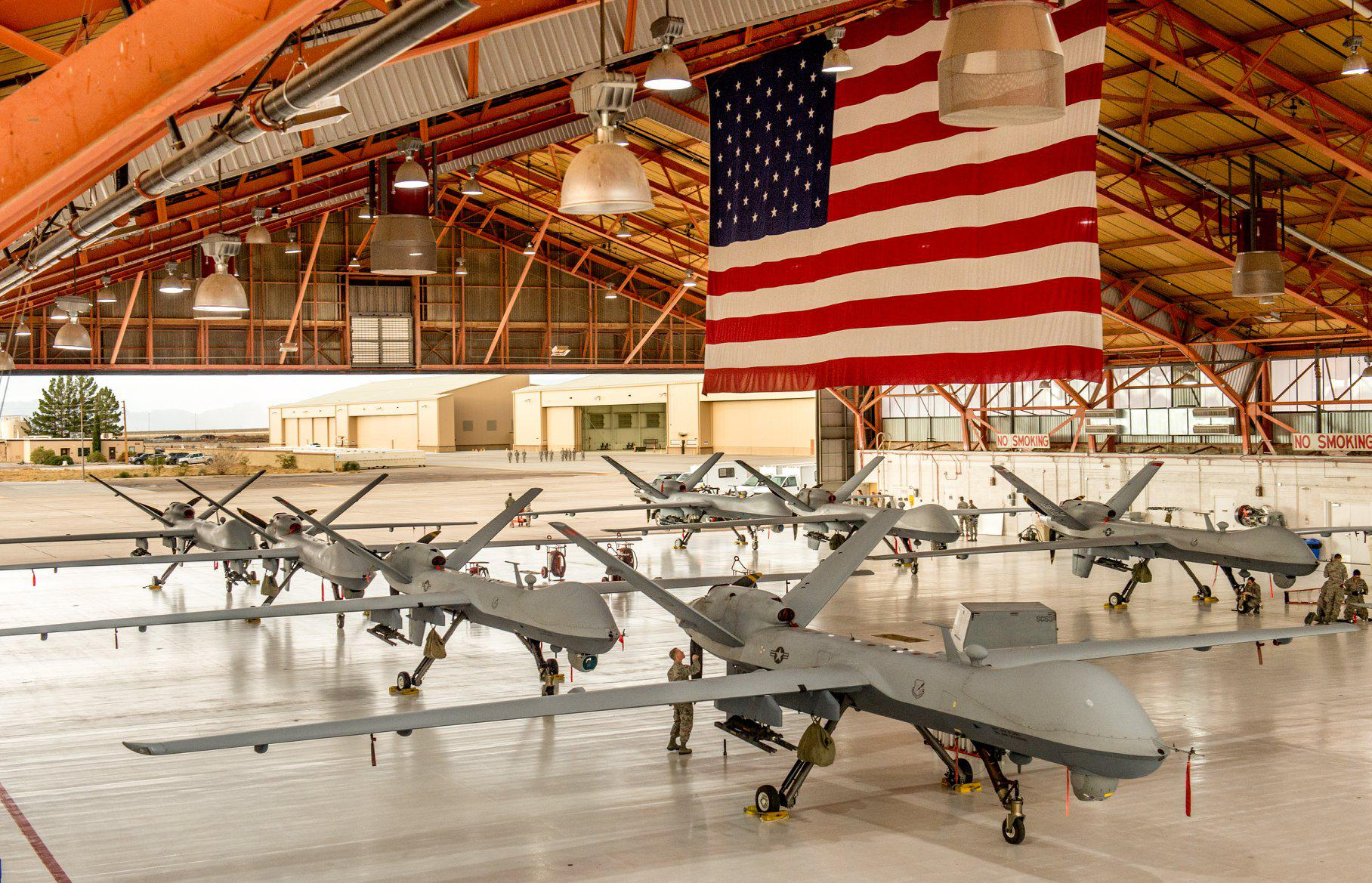
- 49th Wing MQ-9 Reapers at Holloman Air Force Base in 2016
- Active: 1948–present
- Country: United States
- Branch: United States Air Force
- Type: Wing
- Role: Remotely Piloted Vehicle and Fighter training
- Part of: Air Combat Command
- Garrison/HQ: Holloman Air Force Base, New Mexico
- Mottos: TUTOR ET ULTOR Latin I Protect and Avenge
- Engagements: Korean War Vietnam War 1991 Gulf War (Defense of Saudi Arabia; Liberation of Kuwait) Operation Northern/Southern Watch Operation Allied Force Global War on Terrorism

- Decorations: Air Force Outstanding Unit Award with Combat "V" Device Air Force Meritorious Unit Award Air Force Outstanding Unit Award (6x) Republic of Korea Presidential Unit Citation (2x)

Commanders
- Current commander: Col. Michael S. Mullin
- Vice Commander: Colonel Alfred J. Rosales
- Command Chief: Chief Master Sergeant William G. Ford
- Notable commanders: Bruce Carlson; William L. Kirk; Lloyd W. Newton; Edwin A. Doss

Insignia
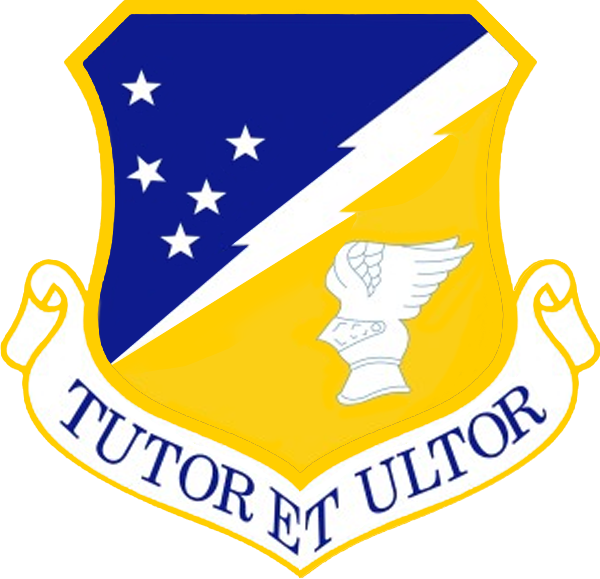
- 49th Wing emblem (approved 10 October 1995)

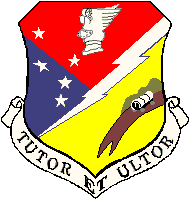
- 49th Tactical Fighter Wing emblem (approved 2 July 1959)

The 49th Wing is a dual mission wing of the United States Air Force. It is assigned to Fifteenth Air Force, Air Combat Command. It is stationed at Holloman Air Force Base, New Mexico. The wing has fought during the Korean War, Vietnam War, Operation Desert Storm and NATO-led Operation Allied Force over Kosovo.

The wing provides combat-ready Airmen training MQ-9 Reaper pilots and sensor operators. It deploys combat-ready and mission-support forces supporting Air Expeditionary Force operations, peacetime contingencies; and provides host base support to over 4,600 personnel. It's also home to the 54th Fighter Group's portion of the F-16 Fighting Falcon pilot training mission, and provides support to the 96th Test Group's high-speed test track mission.

== Units ==
- 49th Operations Group (Tail Code: HO)

The 49th Operations Group trains MQ-9 Reaper pilots and sensor operators.

49th Operations Support Squadron
6th Attack Squadron (MQ-9)
9th Attack Squadron (MQ-9)
16th Training Squadron (MQ-9)
29th Attack Squadron (MQ-9)
491st Attack Squadron (MQ-9)
492d Attack Squadron (MQ-9)

- 49th Maintenance Group

The 49th Maintenance Group maintains aircraft, propulsion, avionics and accessory systems for the MQ-9 aircraft. The group also directs all maintenance, qualification, on-the-job and ancillary training for over 1,200 people.

- 49th Mission Support Group

The 49th Mission Support Group provides a wide spectrum of support services for wing and tenant organizations – these include military and civilian personnel support, maintenance of facility and utility systems, security police duties, communication capabilities, and family leisure programs for Holloman AFB.

- 49th Materiel Maintenance Group

The 49th Materiel Maintenance Group is responsible for the storage, inspection, repair, deployment and accountability of bare base assets belonging to Air Combat Command. The group's 431 authorized personnel encompass 42 Air Force specialties and are responsible for bare base assets worth over $234 million.

- 54th Fighter Group (Tail Code: HO)

8th Fighter Squadron (F-16)
311th Fighter Squadron (F-16)
314th Fighter Squadron (F-16)

== History ==
For additional history and lineage, see 49th Operations Group

=== Origins ===
The history of the 49th Wing begins with its activation at Misawa Air Base, Japan on 10 August 1948. With the end of World War II, the United States Army 32d Engineering Construction Group under the command of Captain Davis K. Stark occupied and began rebuilding the former Imperial Japanese Navy Air Base at Misawa, Japan. In January 1946, the 49th Fighter Group became the first United States Army Air Forces unit assigned to the rebuilt base. In 1948, with the adoption of the Hobson Plan, the United States Air Force 49th Fighter Wing was activated, with the 49th Fighter Group as its combat group.

The initial mission of the 49th Fighter Wing was the air defense of Northern Honshu and Hokkaido. Its 7th Fighter Squadron, 8th Fighter Squadron and 9th Fighter Squadrons were initially equipped with P-51D Mustangs, later being upgraded to the new F-80C Shooting Star jet fighter.

=== Korean War ===
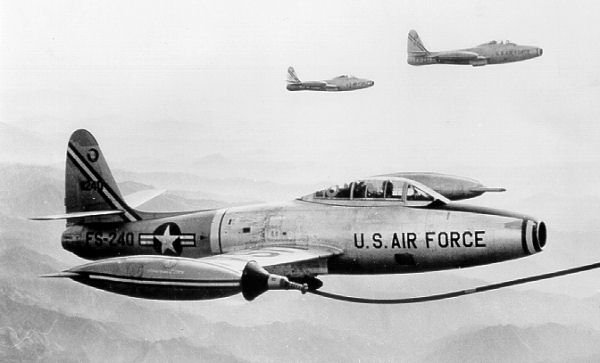
F-84G-25-RE Thunderjet serial 52-3249 of the 9th Fighter-Bomber Squadron being refueled over Korea, 1953

With the outbreak of the Korean War in June 1950, the 49th Fighter-Bomber Wing was one of the first USAF units dispatched to South Korea from Japan, its tactical squadrons began operations with P-51D Mustangs. Initially under its parent wing, the 49th was reassigned to the 8th Fighter-Bomber Wing during July through September, and finally the 6149th Tactical Support Wing during October and November 1950. Korean War squadrons of the 49th were the 7th, 8th and 9th Fighter-Bomber Squadrons.

The 49th's first task in South Korea was to cover the evacuation of civilians from Kimpo Air Base and Suwon Air Base. Next, it flew close air support missions to help slow the advancing North Korean armies. Later, it turned to the interdiction of enemy troops, supplies and communications.

Phasing out its F-51s for Lockheed F-80C Shooting Stars jets, the 49th FBW moved to Taegu Air Base (K-2) on 1 October 1950, becoming the first jet fighter outfit to operate from bases in South Korea. It received a Distinguished Unit Citation for its combat operations during the first five months of the war.

When the Chinese Communist Forces (CCF) Intervention Campaign gained momentum in 1950–1951, the group again concentrated on ground support missions. It converted to Republic F-84G Thunderjets, June–September 1951, one squadron at a time, while the others continued combat operations. The 49th FBG earned another DUC for its contribution to the success of the 1st UN Counteroffensive Campaign (1951). Afterwards, it engaged primarily in air interdiction operations against the main enemy channel of transportation, the roads and railroads between Pyongyang and Sinuiju. Also, it flew close air support missions for the ground forces and attacked high-value targets, including the Sui-ho hydroelectric plants in June 1952 and the Kumgang Political School in October 1952.

On 27 July 1953, the 49th FBG joined the 58th FBG to bomb Sunan Airfield for the final action of F-84 fighter-bombers during the Korean War. The unit was one of the most decorated Air Force units in the war, having earned two Republic of Korea Presidential Unit citations and another eight battle honors. Such accomplishments earned the wing a niche in United States Air Force history.

The wing remained in Korea for a time after the armistice. It was reassigned to Misawa AB, Japan on 2 November 1953 and provided air defense for Japan through 1957.

=== United States Air Forces in Europe ===
On 15 April 1957 the detached 49 Fighter-Bomber Group became a paper unit, and the wing assumed the fighter-bomber mission the group had been performing, continuing it to 15 September 1957, when the wing prepared to move to Europe. Worldwide DOD Budget restrictions during FY 1958 affected PACAF as well as USAFE and the 49th FBW based in Japan had to be retired.

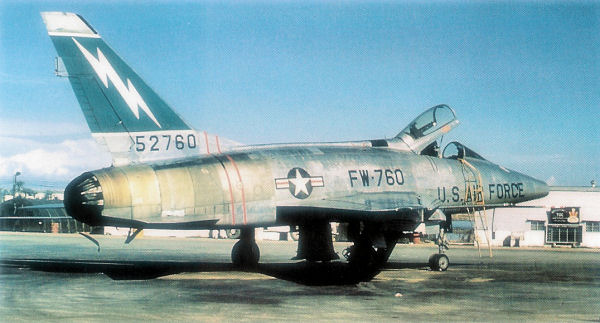
North American F-100D-40-NH Super Sabre Serial 55-2760 assigned to the 7th TFS/49th TFW

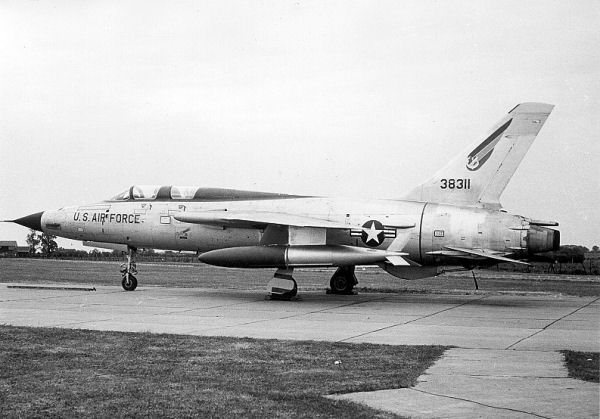
Republic F-105F-1-RE Thunderchief Serial 63-8311 of the 49th Tactical Fighter Wing. During the Vietnam War, this aircraft was modified to the F-105G "Wild Weasel" configuration.

The 49th Fighter-Bomber Wing was reassigned to Etain-Rouvres Air Base, France where it absorbed the assets of the former host unit, the 388th FBW. As the 388th was originally formed in December 1942, and the 49th was formed in November 1940, the older wing's heritage was preserved by transferring its lineage to Etain. The transfer was a strict designation change with no personnel, equipment or aircraft being transferred. All 388th FBW wing units, personnel, equipment and aircraft were redesignated to the 49th FBW and the mission of the 49th FBW was exactly the same as the 388th's. The fighter squadrons were redesignated the 7th, 8th and 9th Fighter-bomber Squadrons.

The stay of the 49th in France was short, as in 1957, the French Government decreed that all nuclear weapons and delivery aircraft had to be removed from French soil by July 1958. As a result, the F-100s of the 49th TFW had to be removed from France.

On 25 August 1959, the 49th Tactical Fighter Wing moved to Spangdahlem AB from the Etain-Rouvres Air Base, France, and assumed host unit duties.

On 8 July 1958 the name of the wing was changed to the 49th Tactical Fighter Wing as a result of an Air Force wide redesignation. Its squadrons were renamed Tactical Fighter Squadrons. On 25 August 1959, the 49th Tactical Fighter Wing relocated to Spangdahlem Air Base, Germany and assumed host unit duties, replacing the 10th Tactical Reconnaissance Wing which was moved to RAF Alconbury England. Tactical Fighger Squadrons of the 49th TFW at Spangdahlem were the 7th, 8th and 9th.

The 49 TFW flew F-100s until 1961 when it converted to the Republic F-105D/F Thunderchief, commonly known as the "Thud". The 49th TFW was only the third USAF unit to operate the F-105. The 49th received two Air Force Outstanding Unit Awards for F-105 operations at Spangdahlem. On 9 March 1967, the Wing began receiving the McDonnell Douglas F-4D Phantom II.

In the late 1960s, the Defense Budget began to be squeezed by the costs of the ongoing Vietnam War. Secretary of Defense Robert MacNamara decided to reduce costs in Europe by "Dual Basing" United States military units in Europe by returning them permanently to the United States, and conducting annual deployment exercises in Europe, giving the units a NATO commitment for deployment to bases in Europe if tensions with the Soviet Union warranted an immediate military buildup. The 49th Tactical Fighter Wing was returned to the United States under this policy, being reassigned on 1 July 1968 to Holloman Air Force Base, New Mexico, to serve as the US Air Force’s first dual-based, NATO-committed wing.

=== Holloman Air Force Base ===
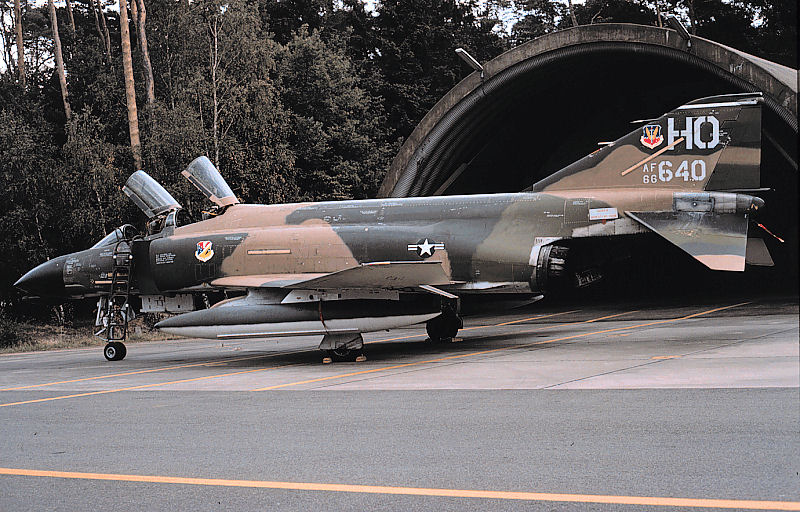
McDonnell F-4D Phantom 66-7640 of the 7th Tactical Fighter Squadron in 1975, photo taken at Ramstein Air Base, West Germany during a NATO deployment

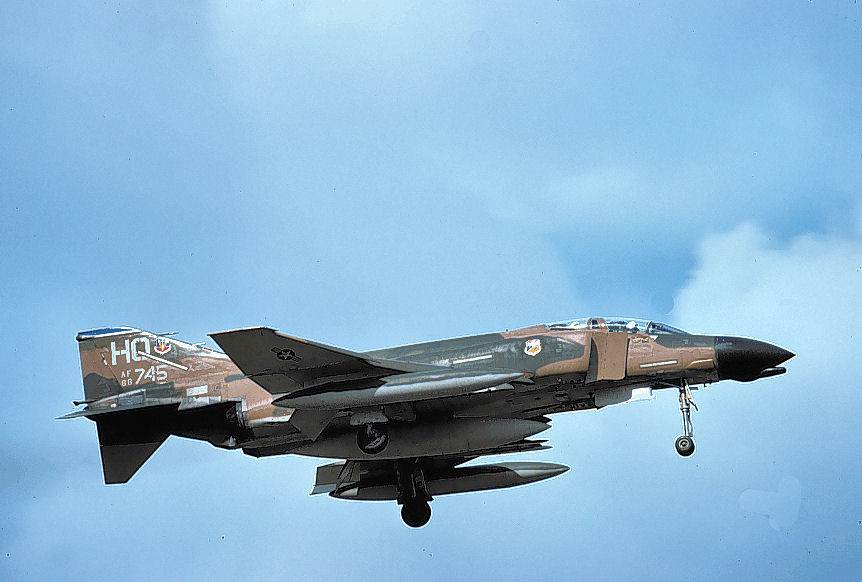
F-4D Phantom 66-7745 8th Tactical Fighter Squadron

At Holloman, the wing continued participation in tactical exercises and firepower demonstrations to maintain combat readiness. It had base host responsibility 1 January 1971 – 1 August 1977 and 15 November 1991 to the present. In the autumn of 1971 the wing's four tactical squadrons deployed in Europe.

In 1969, the wing participated in its first dual-basing exercise, Crested Cap I, deploying 2,000 personnel and 72 aircraft to NATO bases in Europe. Also in 1969, the 49th earned the coveted MacKay Trophy for the "most meritorious flight of the year," for the redeployment from Germany to Holloman after Crested Cap II. The MacKay Trophy recognized the 49th for the fastest non-stop deployment of jet aircraft accomplished by a wing's entire fleet.

==== Operation Constant Guard III ====
On 4 May 1972, after North Vietnam invaded South Vietnam, the entire wing, except for a rear echelon that remained to run Holloman, deployed at Takhli Royal Thai Air Force Base, Thailand. Operation Constant Guard III, ordered in response to the North Vietnamese invasion, was the largest movement that the Tactical Air Command (TAC) had ever performed. In nine days, the 49th TFW deployed 72 F-4D Phantom IIs from Holloman to Takhli. The move included more than 3,000 personnel and 1,600 tons of cargo. Airmen arriving reported that Takhli was a mess, with missing or broken plumbing fixtures, no hot water, and no drinking water – that had to be trucked in from Korat every day. Bed frames had been thrown out of the hootches into the high snake-infested grass, and mattresses or bedding consisted of sleeping bags at best.

The 49th flew combat sorties in South Vietnam, Cambodia, and Laos from 1 July – 24 September 1972 during Operation Linebacker, the bombardment campaign in North Vietnam. During this deployment, Operation Constant Guard, the 49th flew more than 21,000 combat hours over just about every battle zone from An Lộc to vital installations in the Hanoi vicinity. During five months of combat, the wing did not lose any aircraft or personnel. The unit officially closed out its Southwest Asia duty 6 October 1972, receiving an Air Force Outstanding Unit Award with Combat "V" Device for its participation.

The wing returned to Holloman Air Force Base in early October 1972, and continued rotating tactical components to Europe to support NATO through September 1977. It also provided USAF fighter lead-in training from February 1974 – December 1976.

==== F-15 Eagle era ====
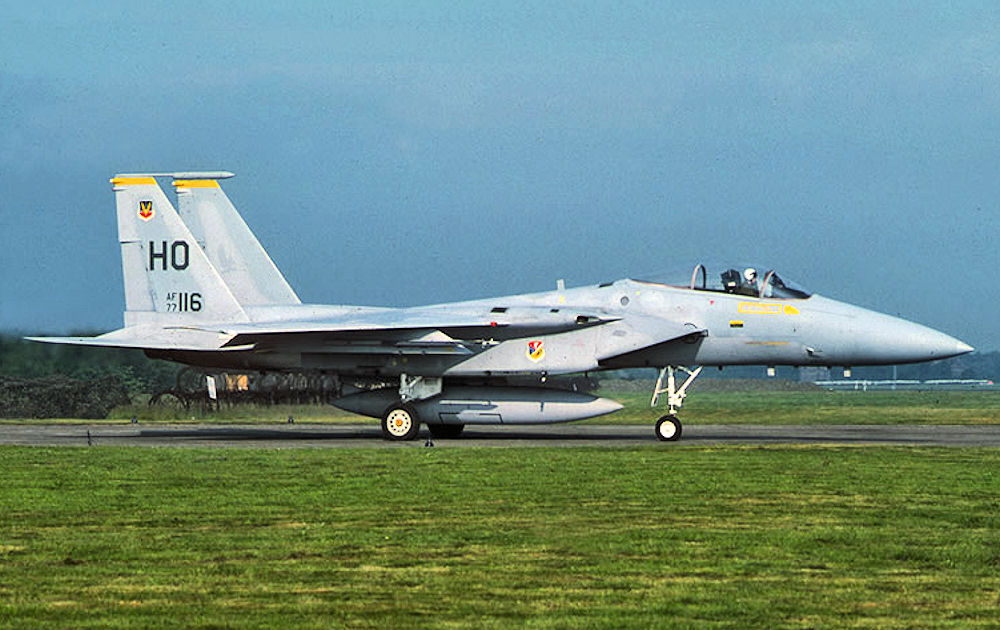
McDonnell Douglas F-15A Eagle 77-0116 of the 8th Tactical Fighter Squadron in 1980.

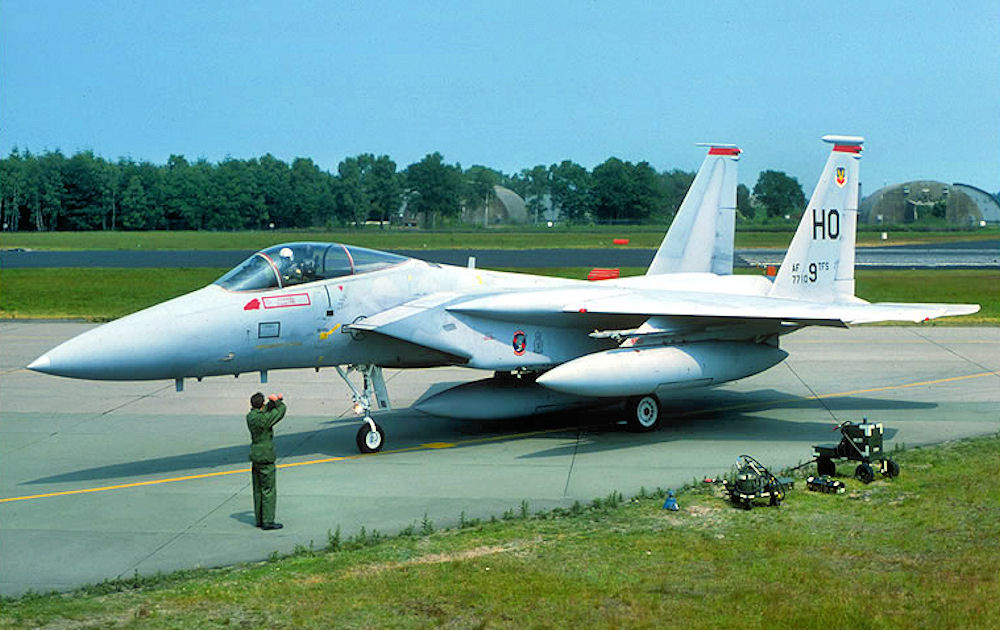
F-15A Eagle 77-0110 9th Tactical Fighter Squadron

In October 1977, the wing ended its "dual-base" commitment to NATO and changed to an air superiority mission with the wing beginning a conversion from the F-4D Phantom II to the F-15A Eagle; the 49th being the second USAF operational wing to receive the F-15A. Capt Thomas Vanderheyden was the initial pilot to start F-15 conversion. The transition was completed 4 June 1978.

Due to the change in equipment, the annual NATO deployments were taken over by the 4th Tactical Fighter Wing, Seymour Johnson AFB, in 1978, however they resumed (although not on an annual basis) in 1981 when the 49th deployed to Ålborg AB, Denmark in August. NATO deployments to various bases in Western Europe ended in 1990. Training was refocused on dissimilar air combat tactics for multi-theater operations.

History was made during February 1980, when two pilots from the 49th each flew their F-15s, 6,200 miles (10,000 km) in just over 14 hours, establishing a record for the longest flight of a single-seat fighter aircraft. Major "Stormy" Summers and Capt "Vmax" Vanderheyden had six aerial refuelings, proving the global power of the 49th Tactical Fighter Wing. In July 1980, the wing acquired the commitment of a primary Rapid Deployment Force unit. This tasking, which lasted for a year, required the wing to be ready to deploy its aircraft, crews, and support personnel on short notice. The wing served with the Rapid Deployment Force until July 1981, when the tasking was transferred to the 1st Tactical Fighter Wing, Langley Air Force Base, Virginia.

The 49th won the 1988 William Tell air-to-air meet. The wing outdistanced the nearest competitor by more than 2,000 points. The 49th won a variety of awards, including the coveted "Top Gun" for best fighter pilot. It deployed aircraft and personnel to Southwest Asia to fly combat air patrol for coalition operations from 20 June – 19 December 1991.

With the introduction of the F-15C Eagle in the mid-1980s, the upgraded Eagle began replacing the F-15A/Bs in service with all of the USAF units that had previously been operating the Eagle with the exception of the 49th TFW. By the time of Operation Desert Storm in 1991, the F-15A Eagles at Holloman had been relegated to a training role; combat deployments of the Eagle were the purview of F-15C units.

==== F-117 Nighthawk era ====
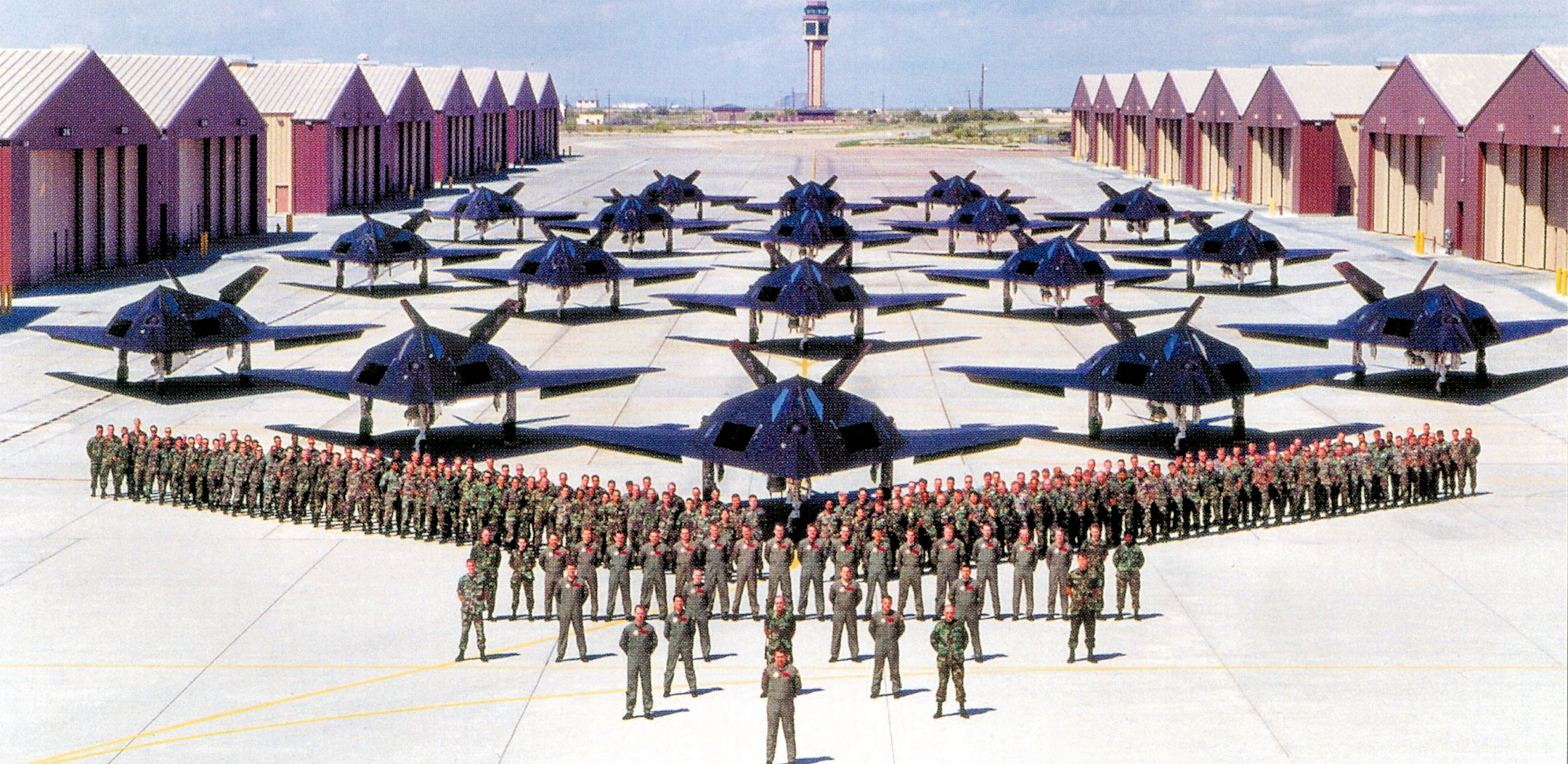
F-117A Nighthawks of the 49th Operations Group at Holloman AFB, taken shortly after their arrival from Tonopah Airport, Nevada in 1992

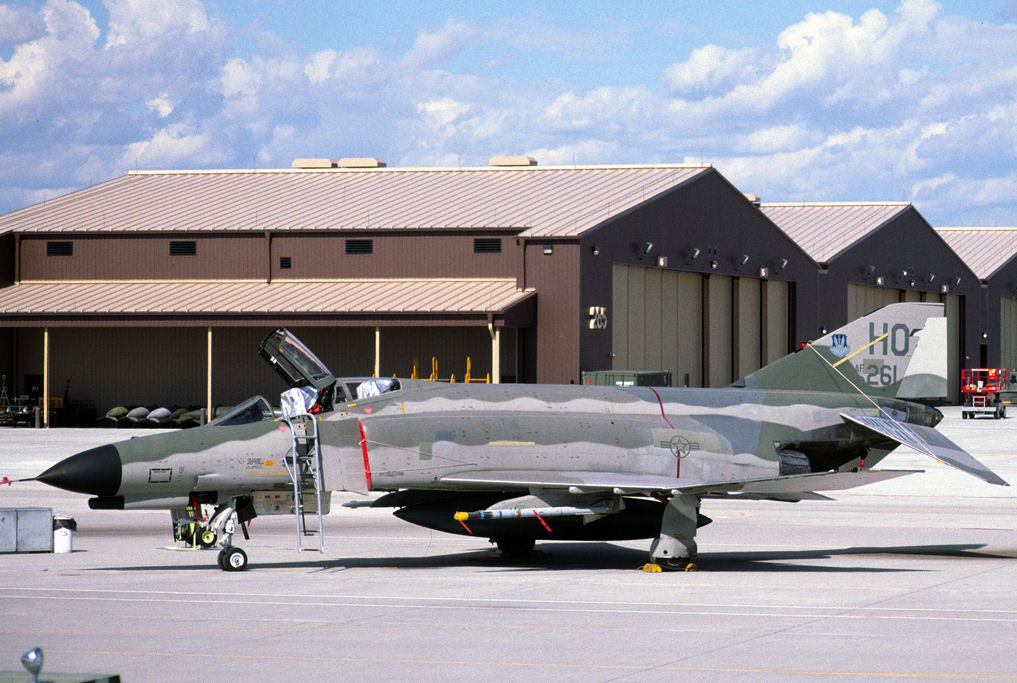
German Air Force F-4F Phantom II 72-1261, flown by the 20th Fighter Squadron at Holloman AFB. The Phantoms were flown until 2004; today the German Air Force operates Panavia Tornado IDS and Eurofighter Typhoon interceptors from Holloman

In 1992, the 49th underwent a number of transitions. As a result of the end of the Cold War, reduced defense budgets were the order of the day. In reviewing its tactical bases and the costs of maintaining them, the Air Force wanted to retire the F-15As at Holloman, most of which were manufactured in the mid 1970s and were costing more and more to operate.

Also as part of the review of all of its bases, the Air Force wanted to move its F-117A Nighthawk stealth fighters of the 37th Fighter Wing out Tonopah Test Range Airport, Nevada, due to the high operating costs of operating the base in its remote location. As a result, Holloman AFB was chosen to be the new home of the F-117A and to retire the F-15A Eagles. Plans were put in place to construct suitable facilities for the F-117A at Holloman.

There was also debate about which unit designation would be adopted at Holloman. The 37th FW was a senior organization to the 49th FW, and initially it was announced that the 49th FW would be inactivated and the 37th would become the new host unit at Holloman. This was changed when General Merrill McPeak, USAF Chief of Staff, determined that the 49th had a more notable history than the 37th, and would remain active while the 37th FW would be inactivated.

As a result, the last F-15A Eagle departed Holloman 5 June 1992, ending 14 years of Eagle operations. On 9 May 1992, four F-117A stealth fighters from Tonopah arrived at Holloman with the 49th Fighter Wing taking over as the only stealth fighter wing in the world. Also, German Air Force F-4F Phantom IIs training was transferred to Holloman, from the closing George AFB, California, the mission being assigned to the 9th Fighter Squadron, in May 1992 (the 9th became an F-117A squadron in July 1993, GAF training being assigned to the re-activated 20th Fighter Squadron).

After conversion to the F-117A in May 1992, The 49th deployed fighters and their crews to Southwest Asia during the 1990s as part of Operation Southern Watch to support United Nations weapons inspectors in Iraq, to enforce the no-fly zone over the southern part of that country, and for shows of force.

===== Operation Allied Force =====
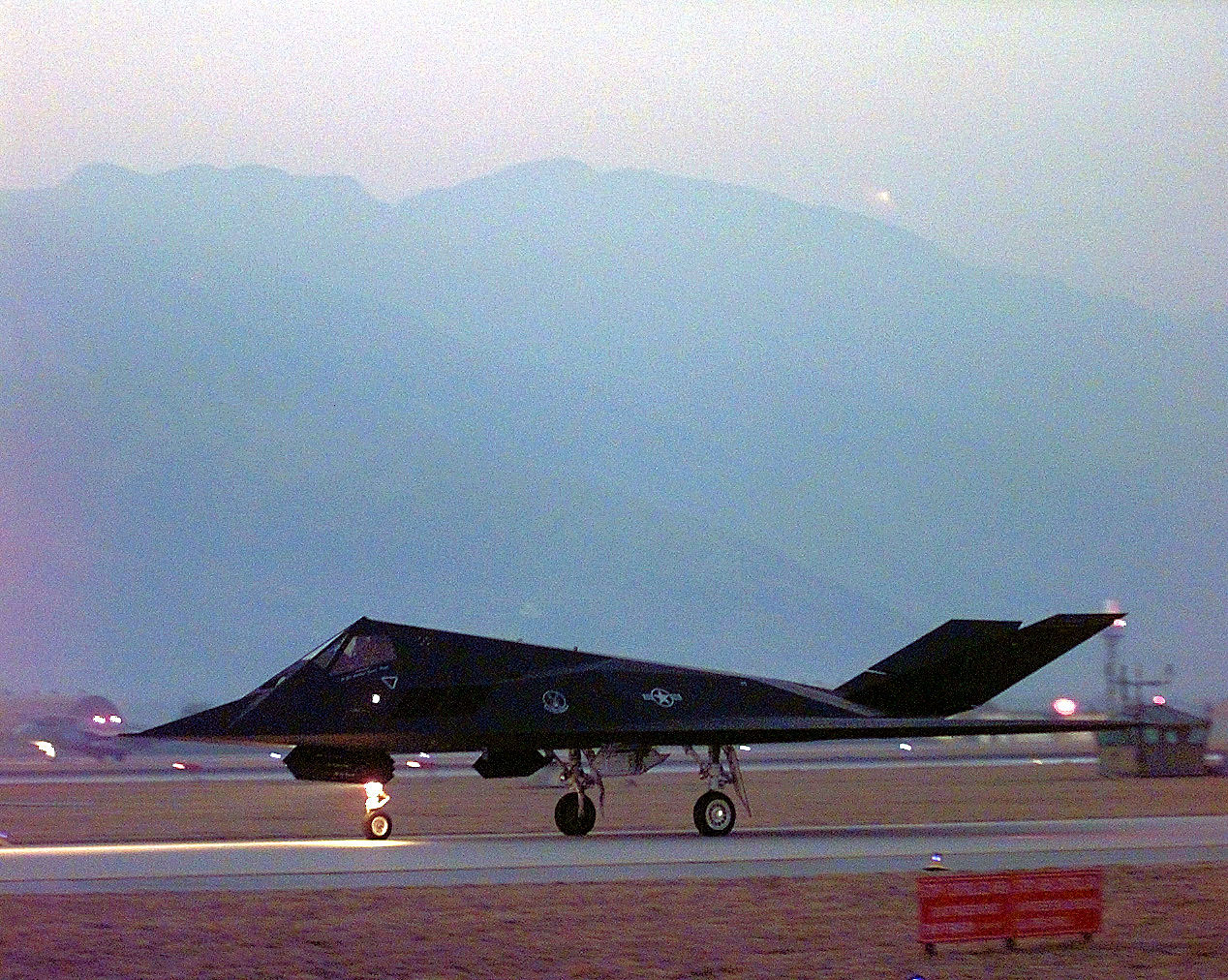
An F-117 Nighthawk taxis out for take off from Aviano Air Base, Italy, for an air strike mission in support of NATO Operation Allied Force on 24 March 1999

In early 1999, the wing deployed F-117 and their crews to Aviano Air Base, Italy and Spangdahlem Air Base, Germany from 21 February – 1 July 1999, in support of Operation Allied Force. In the opening phase of the operation, aimed primarily at Yugoslavia's integrated air defense system, NATO air forces conducted more than 400 sorties. During the first two night attacks, allied air forces struck 90 targets throughout Yugoslavia and in Kosovo. F-117 Nighthawks from the 8th Expeditionary Fighter Squadron participated in air strikes against targets in the Balkans during NATO operations bravely trusting in their aircraft's low observable technology struck some of the most valuable and highly guarded targets in Serbia. The F-117s successfully penetrated the heavily defended areas, which conventional aircraft could not reach.

One F-117 fighter was lost over Yugoslavia on 27 March 1999, struck by a salvo of SA-3 Goa surface-to-air missiles. Unknown to NATO, Yugoslav air defenses operators had found they could detect F-117s with their "obsolete" Soviet radars after some modifications that could detect the aircraft when their wheels were down or bomb bay doors were open. A US search and rescue team picked up the pilot several hours after the F-117 went down outside Belgrade. This was the first and so far the only F-117 to have been lost in action. On 1 April 1999, Defense Secretary William Cohen directed 12 more F-117 stealth fighters to join NATO Operation Allied Force, to join the total of 24 F-117s that were participating in NATO Operation Allied Force.

===== Operation Iraqi Freedom =====
People, airplanes, and equipment of the 49th Fighter Wing played a key role in Operation Iraqi Freedom. The wing's F-117s played a major role, dropping the first bombs against an Iraqi leadership target in Baghdad on 19 March 2003.

Deployed to Al Udeid Air Base, Qatar, on the opening night of the invasion, fresh intelligence was received that Iraqi President Saddam Hussein was staying at a specific bunker for the night. USAF planners had a rare opportunity to kill the elusive Iraqi leader. It was reasoned that might bring down his regime without war. The F-117s would carry the new GPS-guided EGBU-27 precision guided bomb. The problem was it had never been used in combat and the weapons had arrived at Al Udeid a mere 24 hours earlier.

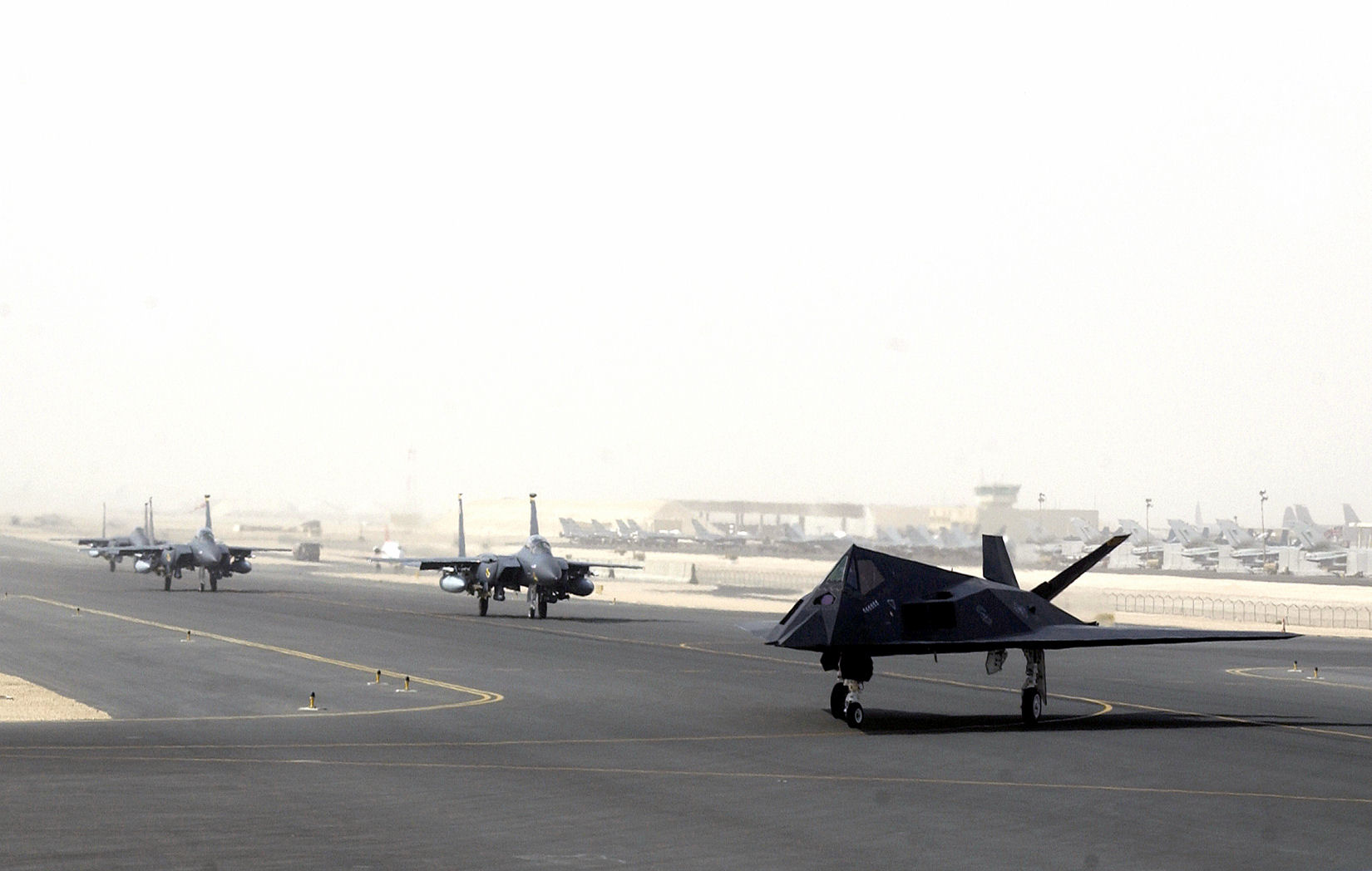
An F-117 and F-15s prepare to fly from Al Udeid Air Base, Qatar, during Operation Enduring Freedom

Combat preparation of the fighters began immediately. The F-117s had to take off as soon as possible. Two stealth fighters roared northward into the nighttime sky at 3:38 a.m. After refueling over the Gulf near Kuwait City, the stealth fighters split up and took separate routes over Iraq to the target area. The sun was starting to come up by the time the pilots reached Baghdad, however on that morning Baghdad was obscured under low-level clouds. Each of the two F-117s released two bombs, which plummeted toward the bunker in which Saddam Hussein was believed to be sleeping. Release came at 5:30 a.m., 13 minutes after dawn but only five hours after the pilots first heard that such a mission might be in the offing. The strike caught Iraqi defenses completely off guard. Defensive anti-aircraft fire did not begin until the aircraft had completed the attack and were racing out of the Baghdad area.

Saddam Hussein was not in the bunker. But the EGBU-27 immediately became the F-117’s premier weapon. According to Air Force data, 98 of them were delivered during the conflict, compared to only 11 of the traditional, predominantly laser versions. During Operation Iraqi Freedom, F-117 pilots flew more than 80 missions and dropped nearly 100 enhanced guided bomb units against key targets. Approximately 300 people deployed with the air package and provided direct support to the F-117 mission.

===== Hurricane Katrina =====
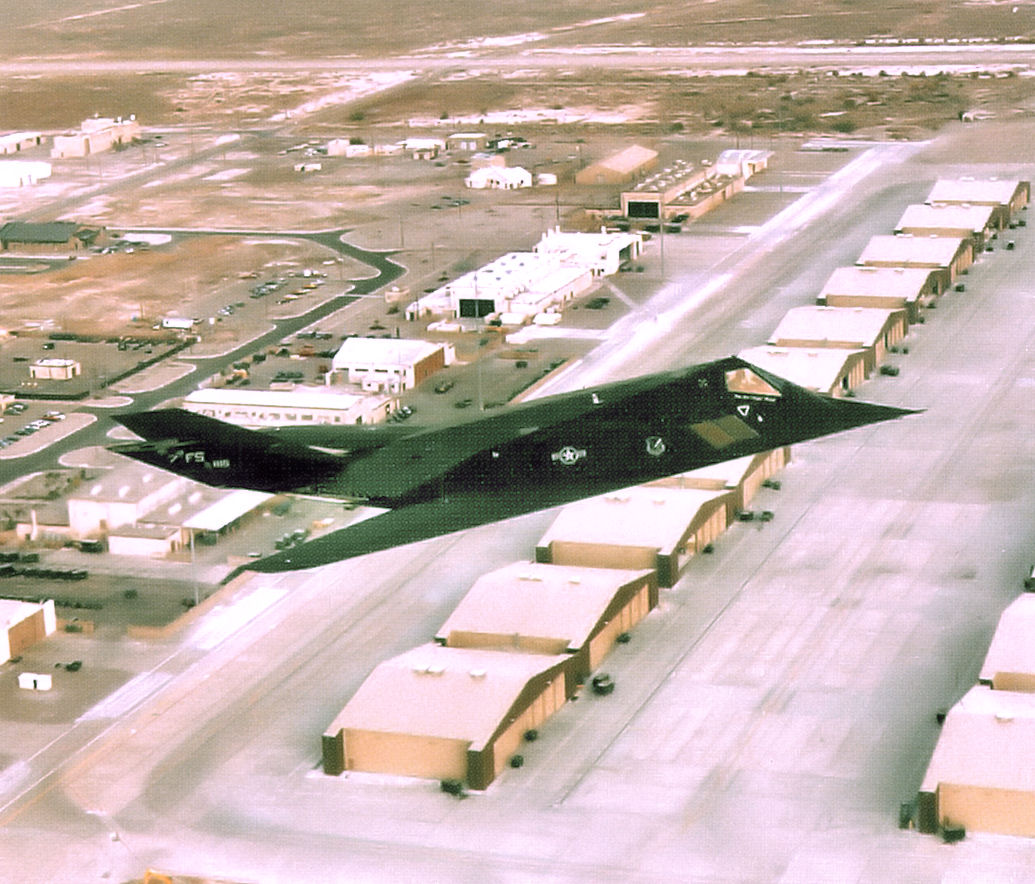
7th Fighter Squadron F-117A making a flyover of Holloman AFB, New Mexico, 2005

The 49th continued to demonstrated its versatility, when on 3 September 2005, the wing answered a humanitarian call from the gulf coast area of the United States. Responding to the devastation of Hurricane Katrina, the wing deployed fifty-nine Airmen from the 49th Materiel Maintenance Group as part of Joint Task Force Katrina. The BEAR Base team sent 120 short tons of cargo and built a tent city and housekeeping facilities for workers providing Hurricane Katrina relief operations.

In 2006, the Air Force announced that Holloman would cease to be the home of the F-117A Nighthawk, coinciding with the announcement that the aircraft was set to be retired from service by 2008. Shortly thereafter, it was announced Holloman was one of the preferred bases to receive the F-22A Raptor.

In the meantime, preparation for the F-117A retirement and the arrival of the F-22 ensued and the base partook in a well-known sideline project. It came about in May 2006, when the 49th Fighter Wing commander, Air Force Public Affairs and Department of Defense representatives announced the filming of the motion picture film, "Transformers," at Holloman. The 49th Fighter Wing's F-117s were pictured prominently in the movie, both as static backgrounds and as taxiing aircraft. The aircraft's big motion picture debut came in June 2007 when the film was released in theaters worldwide. Members of the 49th FW were treated to a special pre-release screen where director, Michael Bay, presented Holloman with an "Oscar" for the base's role.

==== Raptor operations ====
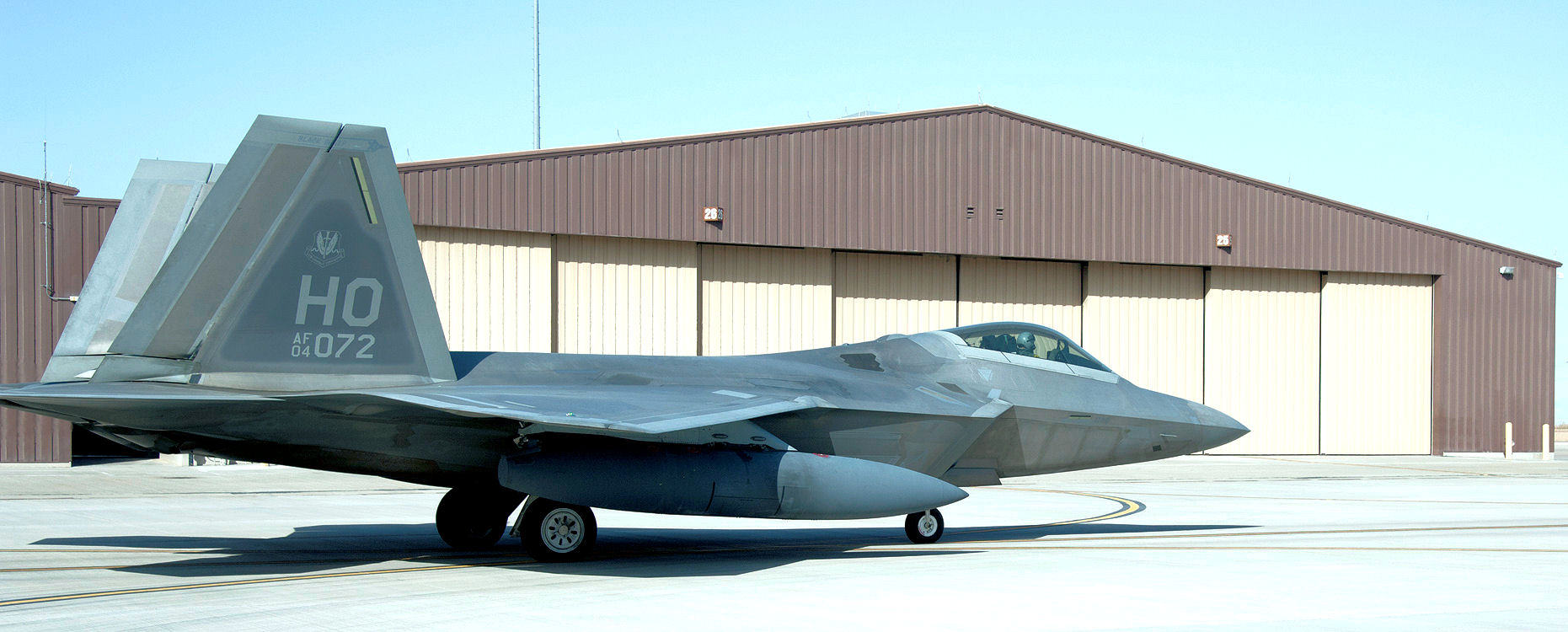
Lockheed Martin F-22A Block 20 Raptor 04-4072 at Holloman AFB, 2013

The next year brought major changes to the 49th Fighter Wing. On 2 June 2008, the first two F-22s were flown to Holloman, marking the day as an important date in the wing's history. The 5th generation fighter aircraft was officially welcomed during a Total Force Integration Announcement Ceremony, 6 June 2008, attended by then-Chief of Staff of the Air Force, Gen. T. Michael Moseley.

The ceremony served a dual purpose: to welcome the new airframe and to announce that the Air Force Reserve's 301st Fighter Squadron from Luke AFB, Ariz., would come to Holloman to form a classic association with the 7th and 8th Fighter Squadrons. The Total Force Integration between active-duty and reserve Airmen would later be official with the stand up of the 44th Fighter Group, 44th Aircraft Maintenance Squadron and 301st Fighter Squadron on 9 April 2010.

An Air Force announcement in July 2009 brought another vital mission to the wing. Holloman was selected as a new location for an additional Remotely Piloted Aircraft (RPA) Formal Training Unit, allowing the base to once again move to the forefront of unmanned aerial vehicle technology as it had in the past. The 49th Fighter Wing FTU would become the Air Force's second MQ-1 Predator and MQ-9 Reaper Formal Training Unit. On 26 Oct. 2009, three RPA squadrons officially stood up under the 49th Fighter Wing—the 29th Attack Squadron, 6th Reconnaissance Squadron and 16th Training Squadron—along with the 849th Aircraft Maintenance Squadron, charged with maintaining Holloman's RPAs.

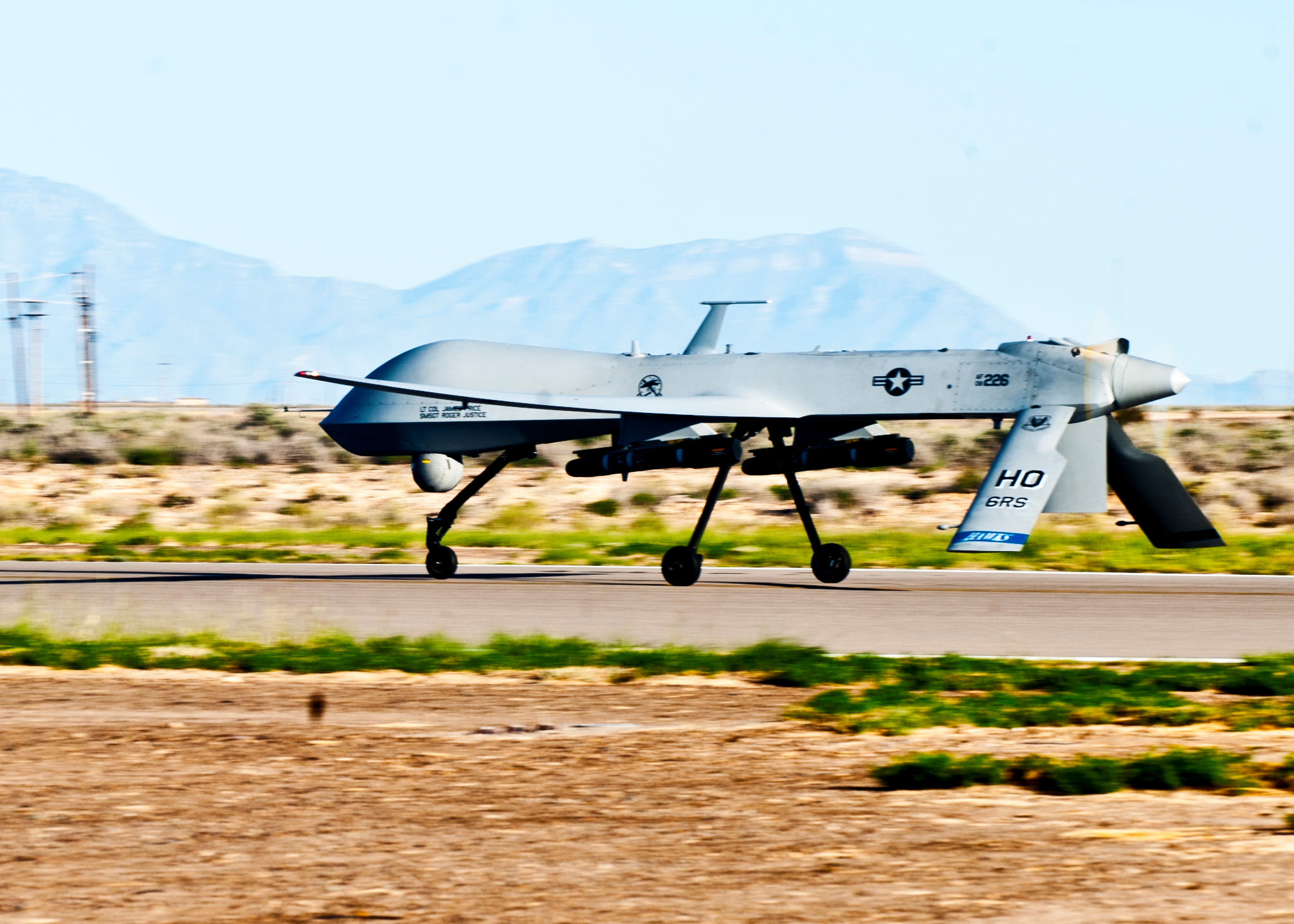
8th Reconnaissance Squadron General Atomics MQ-1 Predator 08-0226.

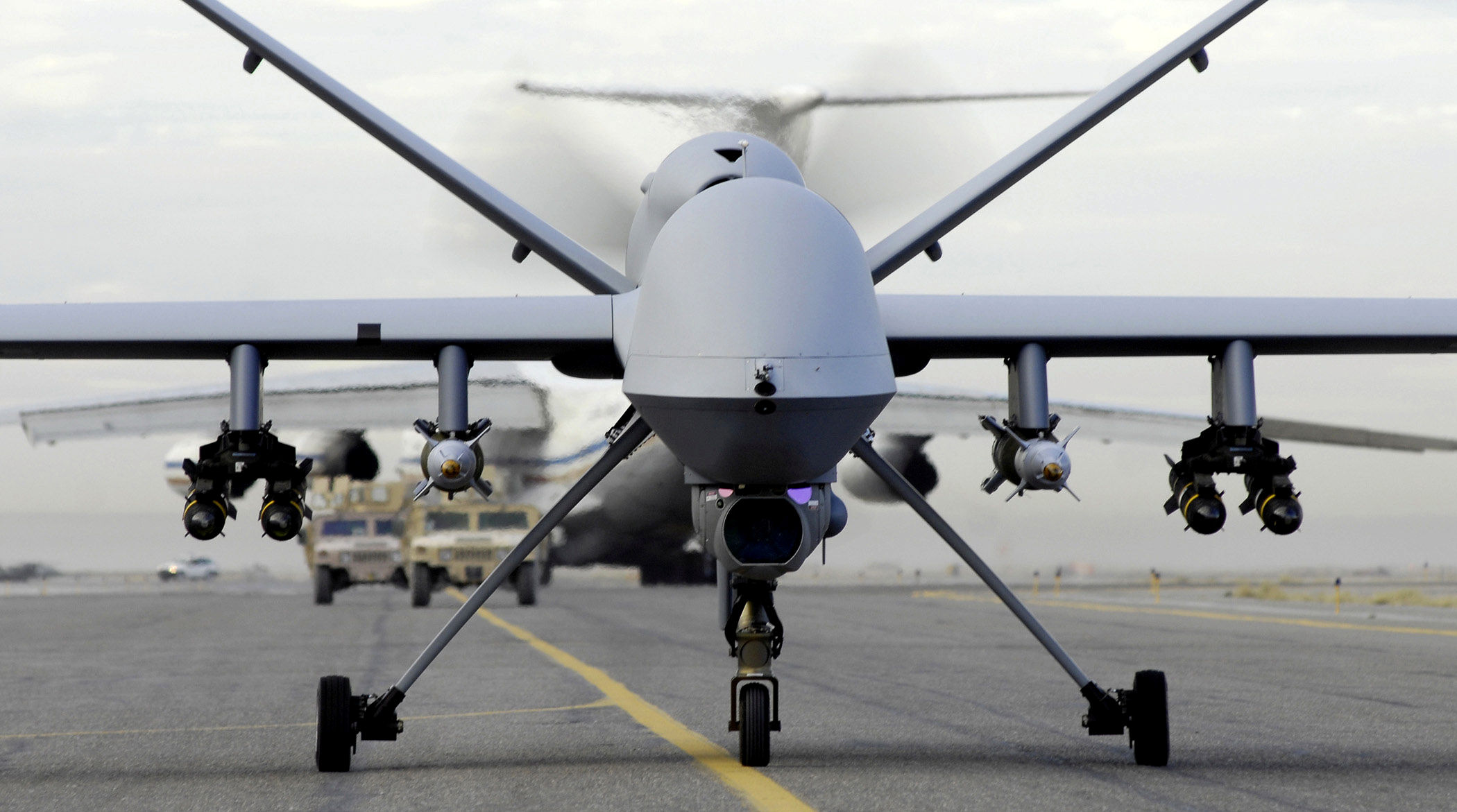
General Atomics MQ-9 Reaper

In early 2010, the 49th Fighter Wing again exemplified its ability to respond in a moment's notice when a 7.0-magnitude earthquake hit the country of Haiti, leaving thousands dead and many more homeless. Units from across the base were tasked to prepare personnel and assets to deploy in the relief effort, later known as Operation United Response. The 49th Materiel Maintenance Group, 49th Civil Engineer Squadron and 49th Logistics Readiness Squadron worked around-the-clock to prepare potable water and equipment to send to the country.

Additionally, the 849th Aircraft Maintenance Squadron was asked to provide two RQ-1 aircraft and a team of crew chiefs and avionics personnel to support the ongoing relief effort. Because it was primarily an RPA training squadron, this was the first time the 849th was tasked with a real-world mission. The contingent from Holloman teamed up with members from the 432nd Maintenance Group at Creech AFB, Nev., to provide intelligence, surveillance and reconnaissance to the troops on the ground assisting the Haitians.

Even amongst ongoing Haiti relief operations, the 49th FW continued to support the war efforts down range. On 26 Feb. 2010, the 49th Materiel Maintenance Group began the movement of approximately 150 truckloads of assets, which were used to directly support joint and coalition forces in Afghanistan. Holloman's BEAR Base supplied 480,000 square feet of AM-2 matting that was used to expand the expeditionary aircraft operations throughout Afghanistan. The AM-2 matting provided was the equivalent of eight football fields and was valued at more than $15 million.

Logisticians and engineers with the 49th also provided expeditionary base facilities and equipment to establish three 550-person encampments, valued at $10 million, for joint service forces in the area of responsibility.

Also in February 2010, the 49th Fighter Wing was the host unit of Red Flag 10-3, an advanced aerial combat exercise where air crews from the U.S. and other allied nations trained in realistic aerial war scenarios at Nellis Air Force Base, Nev.

With the 49th Fighter Wing now supporting multiple unique missions, it was announced in early 2010 that the wing's name would change to the 49th Wing to more accurately portray the diverse wing. The designation from a fighter wing to a wing became official 25 June 2010, during a change of command ceremony where Col. David "Kooler" Krumm became the first 49th Wing commander.

=== Transfer From F-22 Operations ===
The first five F-22 Raptors left Holloman for Tyndall Air Force Base Florida, 6 Jan. with the final four-ship tactical sortie being flown on 20 Feb. Holloman bid farewell to its final Raptor when it departed for Tyndall on 8 April 2014.

=== Reassignment to Air Combat Command ===
On 4 June 2025 during a Change of Command ceremony, it was announced that the 49th wing would be reassigned to the Fifteenth Air Force and assigned to Air Combat Command from Air Education and Training Command in an effort to streamline and optimize Training Pipelines for the Air Force, the 49th Wing is one of Several Wings selected to change Major Commands approved by General Adrian Spain the Commander of Air Combat Command earlier this year

== Lineage ==
- Established as the 49th Fighter Wing on 10 August 1948

Activated on 18 August 1948
Redesignated 49th Fighter-Bomber Wing on 1 February 1950
Redesignated 49th Tactical Fighter Wing on 8 July 1958
Redesignated 49th Fighter Wing on 1 October 1991
Redesignated 49th Wing on 30 June 2010

=== Assignments ===
- 314th Air Division, 18 August 1948
- Fifth Air Force, 1 March 1950 (attached to 58th Fighter-Bomber Wing after 16 March 1953)
- Japan Air Defense Force, 1 April 1953 (attached to Fifth Air Force until 7 November 1953, then to 39th Air Division)
- Fifth Air Force, 1 September 1954 (remained attached to 39th Air Division)
- 39th Air Division, 1 March 1955
- Fifth Air Force, 15 April 1957
- United States Air Forces in Europe, 10 December 1957
- Seventeenth Air Force, 15 November 1969
- 832d Air Division, 1 July 1968 (attached to Seventeenth Air Force, 15 January-4 April 1969)
- 835th Air Division, 1 February 1970 (attached to Seventeenth Air Force, 14 September-7 October 1970)
- Twelfth Air Force, 30 June 1971 (attached to Thirteenth Air Force, 5 May – 2 October 1972)
- Tactical Training, Holloman, 1 August 1977
- 833d Air Division, 1 December 1980
- Twelfth Air Force (later Twelfth Air Force [Air Forces Southern]), 15 November 1991 – 30 September 2018
- Nineteenth Air Force, 1 Oct 2018 – 3 June 2026
- Air Education and Training Command, 1 Oct 2018 - 3 June 2026
- Fifteenth Air Force, 4 June 2026 - present
- Air Combat Command, 4 June 2026 - present

=== Components ===
Groups

- 49th Fighter Group (later 49th Fighter-Bomber Group, 49th Operations Group): 18 August 1948 – 10 December 1957, 15 November 1991 – present

Detached 9 July-30 November 1950, 16–31 March 1953, 2 November 1953 – 15 April 1957

- 543d Tactical Support Group: attached 1 December 1950 – 26 January 1951

Battalions

- 76th Anti-Aircraft Artillery Automatic Weapons Battalion: attached 5-c. 25 January 1951
- 753d Anti-Aircraft Artillery Gun Battalion: attached c. September-c. November 1950
- 865th Anti-Aircraft Artillery Automatic Weapons Battalion: attached c. September-c. 30 November 1950

Squadrons

- 4th Fighter-Interceptor Squadron: attached 10 August 1954 – 15 April 1957
- 7th Fighter-Bomber Squadron (later 7th Tactical Fighter Squadron, 7th Fighter Squadron): attached 9 July-17 Aug 1950 and 7 August 1956 – 15 April 1957, assigned 10 December 1957 – 15 November 1991 (detached 10 September-6 October 1971, 2 March-4 April 1973, 2 April-3 May 1974, 4 October-6 November 1975, 23 August-25 September 1976)
- 8th Fighter-Bomber Squadron (later 8th Tactical Fighter Squadron, 8th Fighter Squadron): attached 15 April-15 October 1957, assigned 10 December 1957 – 15 November 1991 (detached c. 12 September-c. 11 October 1970, 10 September-6 October 1971, 3 March-5 April 1973, 5 September-6 October 1975, 21 September-20 October 1976, 22 August-22 September 1977, 10 September-15 November 1991)
- 9th Fighter-Bomber Squadron (later 9th Tactical Fighter Squadron, 9th Fighter Squadron): attached 17 August-c. 6 September 1950 and 15 April-9 December 1957, assigned 10 December 1957 – 15 November 1991 (detached c. 12 September-c. 11 October 1970, 9 September-7 October 1971, 4 February-15 March 1973, 6 September-7 October 1975, 22 September-21 October 1977, 10 September-10 October 1977 [sic], 20 June-15 November 1991)
- 39th Fighter-Interceptor Squadron: attached 14–20 July 1954
- 45th Tactical Reconnaissance Squadron: attached 27 December 1950 – 24 February 1951
- 334th Fighter-Interceptor Squadron: attached 24 February-1 March 1951
- 336th Fighter-Interceptor Squadron (later 336th Fighter-Bomber Squadron, 336th Fighter-Day Squadron): attached 18 November 1954 – 6 August 1956
- 339th Fighter-Interceptor Squadron: attached 20 July-18 November 1954
- 356th Tactical Fighter Squadron: attached 12 October-9 November 1959
- 417th Tactical Fighter Squadron: 15 November 1970 – 30 April 1977 (detached 9 September-2 October 1971, 3 February-14 March 1973, 5 March-5 April 1974, 3 October-5 November 1975, 24 August-26 September 1976)
- 421st Air Refueling Squadron: 15 February 1954 – 1 October 1957 (detached)
- 434th Tactical Fighter Squadron: attached 12 August-6 October 1972
- 465th Tactical Fighter Training Squadron: 1 August 1973 – 1 January 1977
- 4449th Tactical Fighter Squadron: 12 July-10 October 1972

Batteries

- Battery A, 76th AAA Automatic Weapons Battalion: attached 1–25 Jan 1951
- Battery A, 933d AAA Automatic Weapons Battalion: attached 18 Dec 1950 – 5 Jan 1951

Flights

- Unnumbered (of 41st Fighter-Interceptor Squadron): attached 6 Sep – 30 November 1950
- Unnumbered (of 339th Fighter-Interceptor Squadron): attached c. October-c. 30 November 1950
- 6113th Air Weather Flight: assigned 18 August 1948 – 26 January 1949, attached 27 January-10 April 1949.

=== Stations ===
- Misawa AB, Japan, 18 Aug 1948
- Taegu AB (K-2), South Korea, 1 Dec 1950
- Tsuki AB, Japan, 26 Jan 1951
- Taegu AB (K-2), South Korea, 24 Feb 1951
- Kunsan AB (K-8), South Korea, 1 Apr 1953
- Misawa AB, Japan, 7 Nov 1953 – 10 Dec 1957
- Étain-Rouvres AB, France, 10 Dec 1957

Operated from Chalons-Vatry AB, France, 1 Sep – 30 Nov 1958

- Spangdahlem AB, West Germany, 25 Aug 1959 – 30 Jun 1968
- Holloman AFB, New Mexico, 1 Jul 1968 – Present

Coronet Exercises

During the 1980s and 1990s the 49 TFW made several "Coronet" deployments to Collocated Operating Bases (COB) in the Netherlands;

- In May and June 1986, 7 TFS deployed with twelve F-15A/B Eagles as part of Coronet Mescalero to Gilze-Rijen air base, while 9 TFS deployed to Soesterberg air base (Camp New Amsterdam) at the same time;
- In May and June 1987, 8 TFS deployed with the F-15A Eagle as part of Coronet Scout to Gilze-Rijen AB;
- In June and July 1990, 7 TFS deployed with twelve F-15A/B Eagles as part of Coronet Bullet to Gilze-Rijen AB;
- In June and July 1990, 8 TFS deployed with twelve F-15A/B Eagles as part of Coronet Shooter to Gilze-Rijen AB;
- In June and July 1993, 415 FS, part of the renamed 49 Fighter Wing, deployed with eight F-117A Nighthawks as part of Coronet Havoc to Gilze-Rijen AB. This was the first time the F-117A Nighthawk deployed for an exercise to the European theater, and only the second time the Stealth jet deployed for an exercise outside the United States.

=== Aircraft ===
- P (later, F)-51 Mustang, 1948–1950
- F-61 Black Widow, 1948–1949
- F-80C Shooting Star, 1948–1951
- F-82 Twin Mustang, 1950
- RF-80 Shooting Star, 1950–1951
- F/RF-51 Mustang, 1950–1951
- RB-26 Invader, 1950–1951
- F-84G Thunderjet, 1951–1953, 1953, 1957
- F-86 Sabre, 1951, 1954–1957
- F-100 Super Sabre, 1957–1962
- F-105 Thunderchief, 1961–1967
- F-4 Phantom II, 1967–1971, 1971–1978, 1992–2004
- T-38 Talon, 1973–1976, 1993–Present
- F-15A/B Eagle, 1977–1992
- AT-38 Talon, 1977–1997
- F-117A Nighthawk, 1992–2008
- HH-60 Pave Hawk, 1993–1999
- F-22A Raptor, 2008–2014
- MQ-1 Predator, 2009–2018
- MQ-9 Reaper, 2009–Present
- F-16 Fighting Falcon, 2017-Present
