= 35th Operations Group =

35th Operations Group

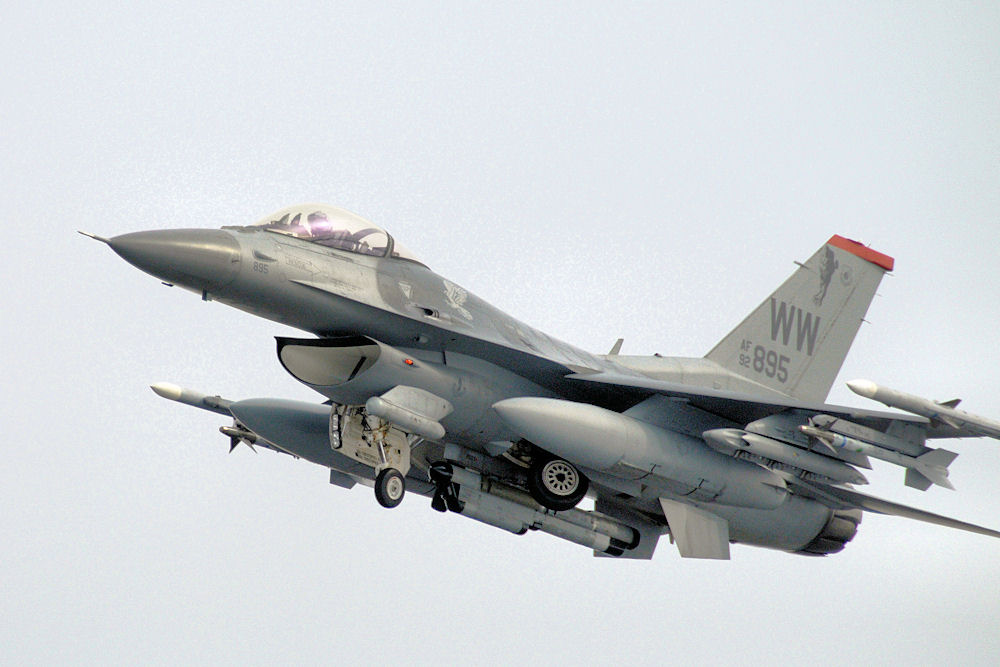
- Group F-16 Fighting Falcon (Note: Aircraft is Lockheed F-16CJ Block 50P Fighting Falcon, serial 92-3895 of the 13th Fighter Squadron.)
- Active: 1940–1957; 1963–1965; 1993–1994; 1994–present
- Country: United States
- Branch: United States Air Force
- Role: Suppression of enemy air defenses
- Motto: Attack to Defend
- Engagements: Southwest Pacific Theater Korean War
- Decorations: Distinguished Unit Citation

Commanders
- Notable commanders: Edwin A. Doss

Insignia
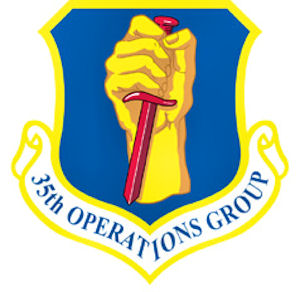
- 35th Operations Group emblem: (Note: While assigned to the 35th Wing, the group uses the wing emblem with the group designation on the scroll. AF Instruction 84-105, Organizational Lineage, Honors and History, 27 April 2017, paragraph 3.3.3.)

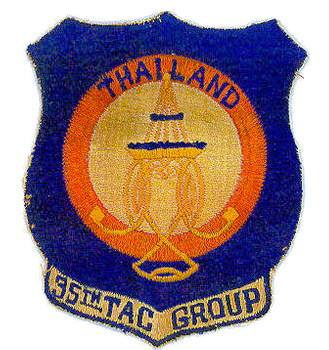
- 35th Tactical Group emblem

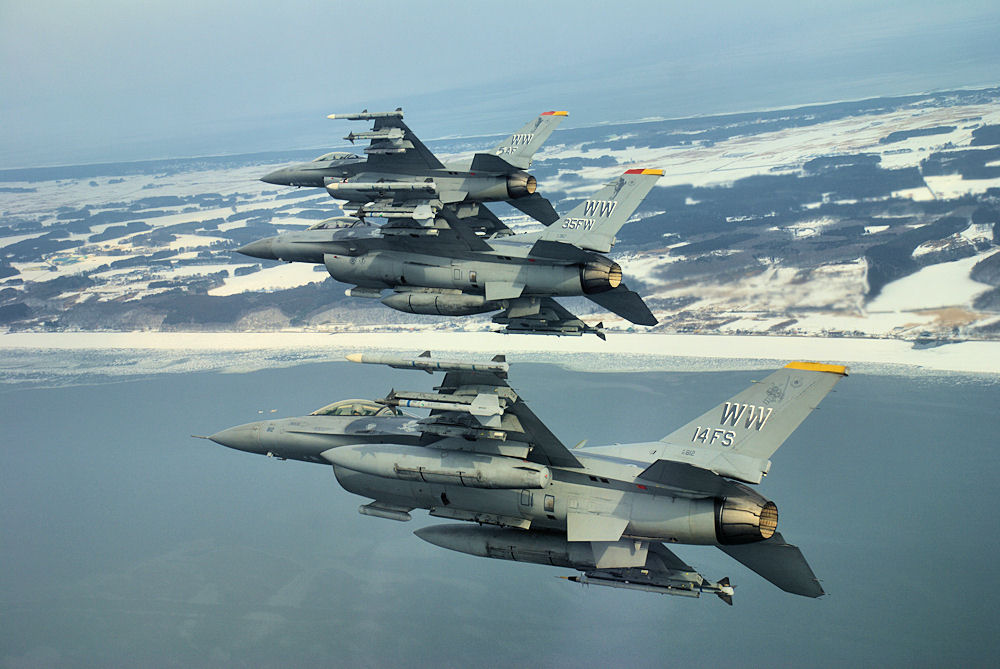
Formation of Block 50A F-16CJs, 90-0812 from the 14th Fighter Squadron identifiable.

The 35th Operations Group is the operational flying component of the United States Air Force 35th Fighter Wing. It is stationed at Misawa Air Base, Japan, and is a part of Pacific Air Forces.

During World War II, the unit's predecessor, the 35th Fighter Group operated primarily in the Southwest Pacific Theater as part of Fifth Air Force, first using Lockheed P-38 Lightnings and Bell P-39 Airacobras, and later Republic P-47 Thunderbolts. The group engaged the enemy in numerous campaigns being awarded both the United States Distinguished Unit Citation (DUC) and the Philippine Presidential Unit Citation.

The group operated from bases in Japan and South Korea during the Korean War, in support of UN ground forces, bombing and strafing enemy supply lines, troop concentrations, and communications, earning a second DUC.

Since the 1990s, the group has deployed aircraft and personnel to Southwest Asia, in support of both the Iraqi no-fly zones (Operations Southern Watch and Northern Watch), and the global war on terrorism.

== Mission ==
The 35 Operations Group is a combat-ready fighter group composed of two deployable F-16CJ "Wild Weasel" fighter squadrons (Tail Code: WW), one operational support squadron, and one air control flight capable of conducting and supporting air operations worldwide. Responsible for flight operations, airfield management, intelligence, tactical air control, combat plans, weapons and tactics, and weather support for the 35 FW. The group is assigned the following squadrons:

- 13th Fighter Squadron (Red tail stripe) "Panthers"
- 14th Fighter Squadron (Yellow tail stripe) "Fightin' Samurai"
- 35th Operations Support Squadron
- 610th Air Control Flight

== History ==
The 35th Pursuit Group (Interceptor)' was activated at Moffett Field, California on 1 February 1940. Initial squadrons of the group were the 21st Pursuit Squadron and 34th Pursuit Squadrons. Initially training with Seversky P-35s, Curtiss P-36 Hawks, Bell P-39 Airacobras, and Curtiss P-40 Warhawk aircraft, the group moved to the Philippines in November 1941.

=== World War II ===
The air echelons of the 21st and 34th Pursuit squadrons arrived in Philippines and were attached to the 24th Pursuit Group, being stationed at Nichols and Del Carmen Fields on Luzon.

Headquarters and a third squadron (the 70th Pursuit Squadron) sailed for Manila on 5 December but because of the Japanese attack on Pearl Harbor they returned to Hamilton Field where the squadron flew some patrols.

The 21st and 34th Pursuit Squadrons fought in the Battle of the Philippines (1941–42). Both squadrons were wiped out in the battle, with the men eventually fighting as infantry during the Battle of Bataan. The survivors were subjected to the Bataan Death March, although some did escape to Australia.

Headquarters and the 70th squadron sailed for Brisbane, Australia on 12 January 1942. On 15 January all the combat squadrons were relieved and three others, still in the US, were assigned.

Group headquarters reached Brisbane in February 1942 while the squadrons had moved from the US to various locations (Ballarat, Mount Gambier, Williamstown, Woodstock) in Australia and were training for combat with P-39s.

From Australia, the 35th entered combat with Fifth Air Force, operating successively from bases in Australia, New Guinea, Owi, Morotai, and the Philippines. First used Lockheed P-38 Lightnings and P-39s; equipped with Republic P-47 Thunderbolts late in 1943 and with North American P-51 Mustangs in March 1945. The group helped to halt the Japanese advance in Papua and took part in the Allied offensive that recovered the rest of New Guinea, flying protective patrols over Port Moresby, escorting bombers and transports, attacking Japanese airfields and supply lines, and providing cover for Allied landings.

In 1944 the 35th began long-range missions against enemy airfields and installations in the southern Philippines, Halmahera, and Borneo, preparatory to the US invasion of the Philippines. Beginning in January 1945, operated in support of ground forces on Luzon. Also escorted bombers and completed some fighter sweeps to Formosa and China. Bombed and strafed railways and airfields in Kyūshū and Korea after moving to Okinawa in June 1945.

After the surrender of Japan, the group became part of Far East Air Forces occupation forces and trained, took part in maneuvers, and flew surveillance patrols over Honshū.

=== Korean War ===
The 35th entered combat in the Korean War in July 1950, flying Lockheed F-80 Shooting Stars and later North American F-51 Mustangs. It operated from bases in Japan and both North and South Korea in support of UN ground forces, bombing and strafing enemy supply lines, troop concentrations, and communications. In August 1950 No. 77 Squadron RAAF was assigned to the 35th Group for operations during the Korean War. Transferring back to Japan in May 1951, it became non-operational in January–July 1954. It then provided air defense for central Japan until late 1956 but was not operational from October 1956 – October 1957.

Between July 1963 and July 1965, the 35th Tactical Group assisted in training the Royal Thai Air Force and supported and exercised operational control over USAF units and detachments in Thailand assigned or attached to the 2d Air Division.

In January 1984, the inactive 35th Tactical Group and the inactive 35th Fighter-Interceptor Group were consolidated into one unit. Both remained inactive.

Between May 1993 and October 1994, the resurrected 35th Operations Group managed a fighter (F-15C) and rescue squadron (HH-60G) in Iceland under the 35th Wing. The group activated at Misawa Air Base, Japan on 1 October 1994, as part of the 35th Fighter Wing, replacing the 432d Fighter Wing and assuming its personnel and F-16C/D aircraft, the same day it inactivated in Iceland. It supported units of the Japanese Air Self Defense Force Northern Air Defense Force. In addition to providing air defense of northern Japan, the group deployed aircraft and personnel to Southwest Asia in support of Operations Northern and Southern Watch and the war on terrorism 1997–2003.

=== Lineage ===
- Established as 35 Pursuit Group (Interceptor) on 22 December 1939

Activated on 1 February 1940
Redesignated 35 Fighter Group on 15 May 1942
Redesignated 35 Fighter-Interceptor Group on 20 January 1950
Inactivated on 1 October 1957

- Consolidated with the 35th Tactical Group on 31 January 1984 (remained inactive)
- Redesignated 35 Operations Group on 9 April 1993

Activated on 31 May 1993
Inactivated on 1 October 1994
Activated on 1 October 1994

35th Tactical Group

- Constituted as the 35 Tactical Group and activated on 19 June 1963 (not organized)

Organized on 8 July 1963
Discontinued and inactivated, on 8 July 1965

- Consolidated with the 35th Fighter-Interceptor Group on 31 January 1984 (remained inactive)

=== Assignments ===
- General Headquarters Air Force, 1 February 1940
- Southwest Air District (later, 4th Air Force), 16 January 1941
- IV Interceptor Command, 2 October 1941
- 10th Fighter Wing, 9 December 1941 – 12 January 1942
- Allied Air Forces, Southwest Pacific Area, 23 April 1942
- 5th (later, Fifth) Air Force, 6 September 1942
- V Fighter Command, 11 November 1942 (attached to 310th Bombardment Wing after 1 February 1944)
- 85th Fighter Wing, 19 April 1944 (attached to 310 Bombardment Wing until 1 August 1944, 309th Bombardment Wing to September 1944. 310 Bombardment Wing after 2 October 1944)
- V Fighter Command, 11 May 1945 (attached to 310 Bombardment Wing)
- V Bomber Command, 10 November 1945 (attached to 310 Bombardment Wing)
- 314th Composite Wing, 25 May 1946
- 35th Fighter Wing (later 35 Fighter-Interceptor Wing), 18 August 1948 – 1 October 1957 (attached to: 6131st Tactical Support Wing, 1 August-5 September 1950, 6350th Tactical Support Wing, 6 September-1 December 1950, 6318th Fighter-Bomber Wing, 7–24 May 1951)
- Pacific Air Forces, 19 June 1963
- 2d Air Division, 8 July 1963 – 8 July 1965
- 35th Wing, 31 May 1993 – 1 October 1994
- 35th Fighter Wing, 1 October 1994 – present

=== Components ===
- 13th Fighter Squadron: 1 October 1994–present
- 14th Fighter Squadron: 1 October 1994–present
- 18th Pursuit Squadron: 1 February 1940 – February 1941
- 20th Pursuit Squadron: 1 February-14 December 1940 (detached after 30 October 1940)
- 21st Pursuit Squadron: 1 February 1940 – 15 January 1942 (detached after 1 October 1941 – 15 January 1942)
- 34th Pursuit Squadron: 30 November 1940 – 15 January 1942 (detached 1 October 1941)
- 39th Fighter Squadron (later 39 Fighter-Interceptor Squadron): 15 January 1942 – 1 October 1957 (detached March-4 May 1942; 7 May 1951 – 14 July 1954; 8 October 1956 – 1 July 1957)
- 40th Pursuit Squadron (later 40th Fighter Squadron, 40th Fighter-Interceptor Squadron): 15 January 1942 – 1 October 1957 (detached March-4 May 1942; 15 January – 14 July 1954; 8 October 1956 – 1 July 1957)
- 41st Pursuit Squadron (later 41st Fighter Squadron, 41st Fighter-Interceptor Squadron): 15 January 1942 – 1 October 1957 (detached March-4 May 1942; 9 July 1950 – 25 June 1951; 15 January – 14 July 1954)
- 56th Rescue Squadron: 31 May 1993 – 1 October 1994
- 57th Fighter Squadron: 31 May 1993 – 1 October 1994
- 70th Pursuit Squadron: 1 January 1941 – 15 January 1942
- 82d Tactical Reconnaissance Squadron attached 20 October 1945 – 9 February 1946.

=== Stations ===
- Moffett Field, California, 1 February 1940
- Hamilton Field, California, 10 September 1940 – 5 December 1941 and 9 December 1941 – 12 January 1942
- Archerfield Airport, Brisbane, Australia, 1 February 1942
- New Delhi Airport, India, March 1942
- Sydney Airport, Australia, 4 May 1942
- Port Moresby Airfield Complex, New Guinea, 22 July 1942
- Tsili Tsili Airfield, New Guinea, 15 August 1943
- Nadzab Airfield Complex, New Guinea, 5 October 1943
- Gusap Airfield, New Guinea, 7 February 1944
- Owi Airfield, Schouten Islands, 22 July 1944
- Wama Airfield, Morotai, Netherlands East Indies, 27 September 1944
- Mangaldan Airfield, Luzon, Philippines, c. 20 January 1945
- Lingayen Airfield, Luzon, Philippines, c. 10 April 1945
- Clark Field, Luzon, Philippines, 19 April 1945
- Ie Shima Airfield, Okinawa, 28 June 1945
- Irumagawa Air Force Base (later Johnson Air Force Base, Johnson Air Base), Japan, October 1945
- Yokota Air Base, Japan, 1 April 1950
- Ashiya Air Base, Japan, 8 July 1950
- Pohang Air Base (K-3), South Korea, 14 July 1950
- Tsuiki Air Base, Japan, 13 August 1950
- Pohang Air Base (K-3), South Korea, 3 October 1950
- Yonpo Air Base (K-27), North Korea, 18 November 1950
- Pusan Air Base (K-1), South Korea, c. 3 December 1950
- Johnson Air Base, Japan, 25 May 1951
- Yokota Air Base, Japan, 14 August 1954 – 1 October 1957
- Don Muang Royal Thai Air Force Base, Thailand, 8 July 1963 – 8 July 1965
- Naval Air Station Keflavik, Iceland, 31 May 1993 – 1 October 1994
- Misawa Air Base, Japan, 1 October 1994 – present

=== Aircraft ===
- Seversky P-35, 1940–1941
- Curtiss P-36 Hawk, 1940–1941
- Curtiss P-40 Warhawk, 1940–1941
- Bell P-39 Airacobra, 1942–1944
- P-400, 1942
- Lockheed P-38 Lightning, 1942–1943
- Republic P-47 Thunderbolt, 1943–1945
- North American F-51 Mustang, 1945–1950, 1950–1951, 1951–1953
- Northrop F-61 Black Widow, 1949–1950
- Lockheed F-80 Shooting Star, 1949–1950, 1951–1954
- North American F-82 Twin Mustang, 1949–1950
- Lockheed F-94 Starfire, 1951–1954
- North American F-86 Sabre, 1951, 1952–1953, 1953–1957
- Lockheed RF-80 Shooting Star, 1950, 1951–1952, 1953–1954
- North American RF-51 Mustang, 1952–1953
- Beechcraft RC-45, 1952–1954
- Douglas C-47 Skytrain, 1963, 1964–1965
- F-15, 1993–1994
- HH-60, 1993–1994
- F-16, 1994–present

== See also ==
- United States Army Air Forces in Australia
