= John S. Loisel =

American pilot (1920–2010)

John Simon Loisel
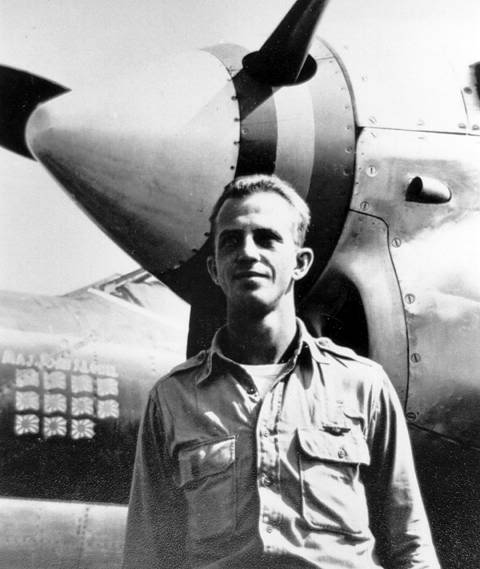
- Major John S. Loisel beside his Lockheed P-38
- Born: May 21, 1920; Coeur d'Alene, Idaho
- Died: January 20, 2010 (aged 89); Plano, Texas
- Burial place: Dallas-Fort Worth National Cemetery
- Military career
- Allegiance: United States
- Branch: United States Army Air Forces; United States Air Force
- Service years: 1941–1970
- Rank: Colonel
- Commands: 83rd Fighter Group; 474th Fighter Bomber Group; 63rd Fighter Squadron; 475th Fighter Group; 432nd Fighter Squadron
- Conflicts: World War II; South West Pacific Theatre; New Guinea campaign; Philippines campaign; Korean War
- Awards: Silver Star; Legion of Merit; Distinguished Flying Cross (4); Air Medal (11)
- Other work: High School Physics teacher

Colonel John Simon Loisel (May 21, 1920 – January 20, 2010) was an American air ace, credited with having shot down 11 Japanese aircraft during World War II. Loisel was born in Coeur d'Alene, Idaho and joined the United States Army Air Forces in 1941. By age 25, Loisel had spent more time in combat than any other American pilot in World War II, with over three years in the Pacific. Serving in the Pacific he quickly distinguished himself by first becoming an ace after achieving five kills in just a two-month period, and then becoming a double ace.

He became a career Air Force officer when the United States Army Air Forces was disbanded in 1947 and would serve in the United States Air Force until 1970. Loisel commanded Fighter Groups in both World War II and Korea, along with several peacetime commands. He retired from the Air Force as a colonel. Following his military career, Loisel taught high school physics for 15 years in the Plano Independent School District.

== Early life ==
Loisel was born in Coeur d'Alene, Idaho on May 21, 1920, and moved with his family to Norfolk, Nebraska by 1922. His parents, Simon M. and Lucille Loisel were first-generation Americans of French-Canadian parents. The elder Loisel worked as a commercial traveler in the lumber industry. Simon Loisel did well enough to keep a live-in servant and to reside in an expensive house for the time. Prior to John being born, Lucille Loisel had been employed as a teacher at a Catholic school in Coeur d'Alene. John Loisel was the eldest child, with six younger brothers and two sisters.

After graduating from high school, Loisel attended Wayne State Teacher's College, Nebraska (now Wayne State College) and the University of Nebraska from 1938 to 1941. He then entered the United States Army Air Forces (USAAF) for flight training at Mather Field, California on March 10, 1941, and received his pilot wings on October 31, 1941.

== Military career ==
=== World War II ===
Upon receiving his wings and a commission as a second lieutenant, Loisel was initially posted for duties as a flight instructor while waiting for assignment. He was then posted to a unit in the Philippine Islands. When he was en route by ship, he learned of the Japanese attack on Pearl Harbor. In late-1941 he was assigned as a Bell P-39 Airacobra fighter pilot with the 36th Fighter Squadron, 8th Fighter Group, based in New Guinea. By June 1943, he had flown 83 combat missions in both the P-39D and the P-400 versions. Loisel was then selected as cadre for the newly formed 432nd Fighter Squadron, 475th Fighter Group, the first Lockheed P-38 Lightning fighter group formed in the USAAF.

Once assigned to the 432nd Fighter Squadron, Loisel began to quickly show his abilities once he started flying an aircraft that could compete with the top-line Japanese fighters. Flying a P-38H, serial no. 42–66682, named the Screaming Kid, he shot down five Japanese fighters within his first two months of flying in the P-38s and earned a promotion to captain. On August 21, 1943, while escorting USAAF bombers near Wewak, New Guinea, he shot down two Kawasaki Ki-61 "Tony" fighters, his first two victories. Less than a month later, on September 22, 1943, he claimed a Mitsubishi A6M "Zero" fighter near Finschafen, New Guinea. Slightly less than two months later Loisel obtained "ace" status by downing two more Zeroes near Oro Bay, New Guinea.

In December 1943, he picked up two more kills, a Zero on the 15th and another Zero on the 21st, during the build-up for the landings at Cape Gloucester. Loisel picked up his eighth victory on January 23, 1944, over a Zero. On April 3, 1944, while escorting Douglas A-20 Havoc bombers near Hollandia, New Guinea, he shot down a Nakajima Ki-43 "Oscar" fighter and a Mitsubishi A6M3 "Hamp" fighter over Lake Sentani, giving him his ninth and tenth kills and making him a double ace. On January 22, 1944, he assumed command of the 432nd Fighter Squadron. This unit was tasked with striking targets in New Guinea and the Indonesian Spice Islands to support General Douglas MacArthur's return to the Philippines. In August 1944, Loisel returned to the United States as a major.

In January 1945, Loisel returned to the 475th Fighter Group as the Operations Officer. After his return to combat following his assignment in the United States, Loisel had his eleventh and final aerial victory on March 28, 1945, when he shot down a Nakajima Ki-84 "Frank" fighter near Tree Island, Indochina (Vietnam). On May 15, 1945, he was promoted to lieutenant colonel and on July 15, 1945 he became the Commanding Officer of the 475th Fighter Group. He relinquished command on April 18, 1946, and returned to the United States.

He had, by the age of 25, become a lieutenant colonel, a fighter group commander, and earned the Silver Star. His assignment to the Pacific Theatre of Operations for over three years was longer than any other American fighter pilot served in combat, and he flew more than 875 hours in combat. Loisel was the fourth leading ace in the 475th Fighter Group, flying with notable aces Thomas McGuire (38 kills), Charles MacDonald (27 kills) and Daniel T. Roberts, Jr. (15 kills). He was known for his aggressiveness, instructing his pilots to "Head for the main body of the enemy – disregard stragglers ... [and] plow into the largest bunch you see."

=== Korea ===
On return to the United States in 1946, he married Rachel 'Rae' Hultman, and re-enrolled at the University of Nebraska to earn his bachelor's degree in physics, graduating in 1949. Beginning in May 1947, he served as the commanding officer of the 63rd Fighter Squadron (an Air Defense – Interceptor unit), based at Selfridge Air Force Base, Michigan, where he led the transition of the unit to the Lockheed P-80 Shooting Star jet fighter. After a staff tour at Headquarters, Air Defense Command, Loisel returned to combat in Korea in May 1953, having been promoted to full colonel on December 1, 1951. Once there, Loisel commanded the 474th Fighter Bomber Group, flying the Republic F-84 Thunderjet fighter. He flew an additional 22 combat missions. One of the subordinate squadrons under his command (the 429th Fighter Bomber Squadron) set an Air Force record for the number of combat sorties flown (80 in one day) in June 1953 and the 474th Fighter Bomber Group set a Fifth Air Force record of 254 sorties on that same day.

=== Post-war career ===
Following the Korean War, Loisel had assignments that included tours as the Commander, 83rd Fighter Group and Deputy Commander, 4th Tactical Fighter Wing. In 1970, having achieved the rank of colonel, over 5,500 flying hours, and 323 combat missions, he retired from the Air Force.

== Later life ==
Following his retirement from the Air Force, Loisel attended North Texas State University (now the University of North Texas), obtaining his master's degree in physics in 1972. Loisel then taught physics at Plano Senior High School in Plano, Texas from 1972 to 1985. Loisel was an "avid golfer" and a member of the American Fighter Aces Association. Loisel was married to Rae Loisel for 63 years. They had a son, John S. Loisel, Jr., and a daughter, Susan Bryan. He died of natural causes on January 20, 2010, in Plano, Texas and is buried at the Dallas-Fort Worth National Cemetery. He is survived by his wife, daughter, and two sisters, Mary Margaret Pappas and Anne Schueth. His son John, Jr. and his brothers predeceased him.

== Awards and decorations ==

USAF Command Pilot badge
Silver Star	Legion of Merit	Distinguished Flying Crosses with three bronze oak leaf clusters
Air Medal with two silver oak leaf clusters	Presidential Unit Citation with four bronze oak leaf clusters	American Defense Service Medal with service star
American Campaign Medal	Asiatic-Pacific Campaign Medal with two silver campaign stars	World War II Victory Medal
Army of Occupation Medal	National Defense Service Medal with service star	Korean Service Medal
Air Force Longevity Service Ribbon with silver oak leaf cluster	Philippine Liberation Medal	Philippine Independence Medal
Republic of Korea Ulchi Medal with silver star	United Nations Korea Medal	Korean War Service Medal

=== Other honors ===
- Grand Marshal, Dallas Veteran's Day Parade, Dallas, Texas, 2007
- Nebraska Aviation Hall of Fame, inducted 1994
- U.S. Air Force Gathering of Eagles, inducted 1991
