= Andrew J. Evans Jr. =

United States Air Force general and flying ace

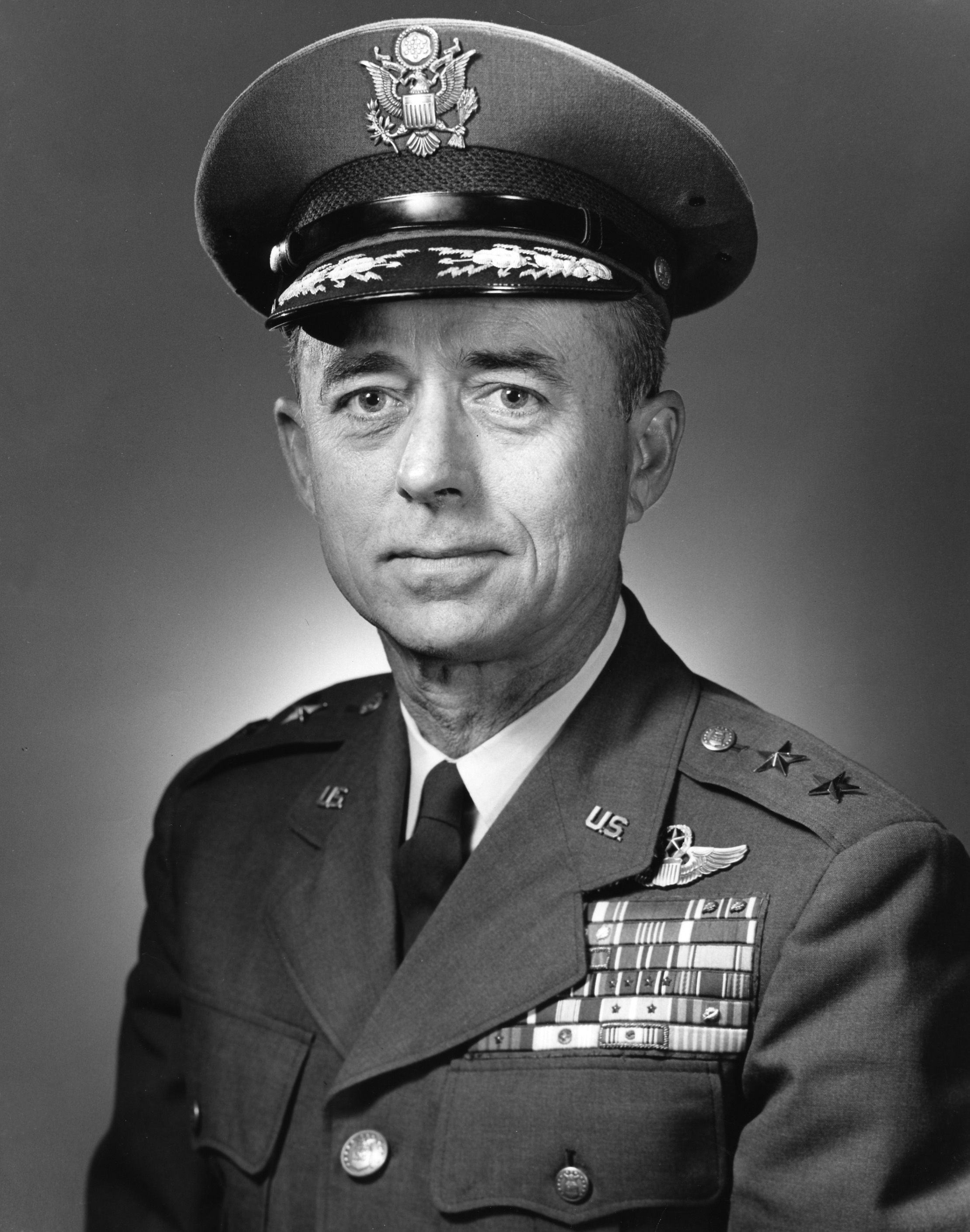
- Evans in the 1960s
- Born: November 11, 1918; Charleston, South Carolina, U.S.
- Died: December 25, 2001 (aged 83); San Antonio, Texas, U.S.
- Burial place: Arlington National Cemetery
- Military career
- Branch: United States Army Air Forces; United States Air Force
- Service years: 1941–1973
- Rank: Major General
- Nickname: "Andy"
- Units: 357th Fighter Group; 49th Fighter-Bomber Wing
- Commands: 533d Fighter Squadron; 448th Fighter Squadron; 357th Fighter Group; 414th Fighter Group; New York Air Defense Sector; 65th Air Division; United States Air Force Tactical Warfare Center; U.S. Military Assistance Command, Thailand
- Conflicts: World War II; Korean War; Vietnam War
- Awards: Air Force Distinguished Service Medal (2); Silver Star; Legion of Merit (2); Distinguished Flying Cross (3); Purple Heart; Air Medal (13)

Andrew Julius Evans Jr. (November 11, 1918 – December 25, 2001) was a United States Air Force major general and a flying ace, who was credited in destroying six enemy aircraft in aerial combat and two enemy aircraft on the ground during World War II. He also served in the Korean War, where he flew combat missions before he was shot down and taken prisoner. After his release, he flew missions during the Vietnam War before retiring in 1973.

== Early life ==
Evans was born on November 11, 1918, in Charleston, South Carolina. After graduating from Columbus High School in Columbus, Georgia, he attended The Citadel in Charleston. In 1937, he attended the United States Military Academy in West Point and graduated in 1941 with a Bachelor of Science degree and was commissioned as a second lieutenant.

== Military career ==
=== World War II ===
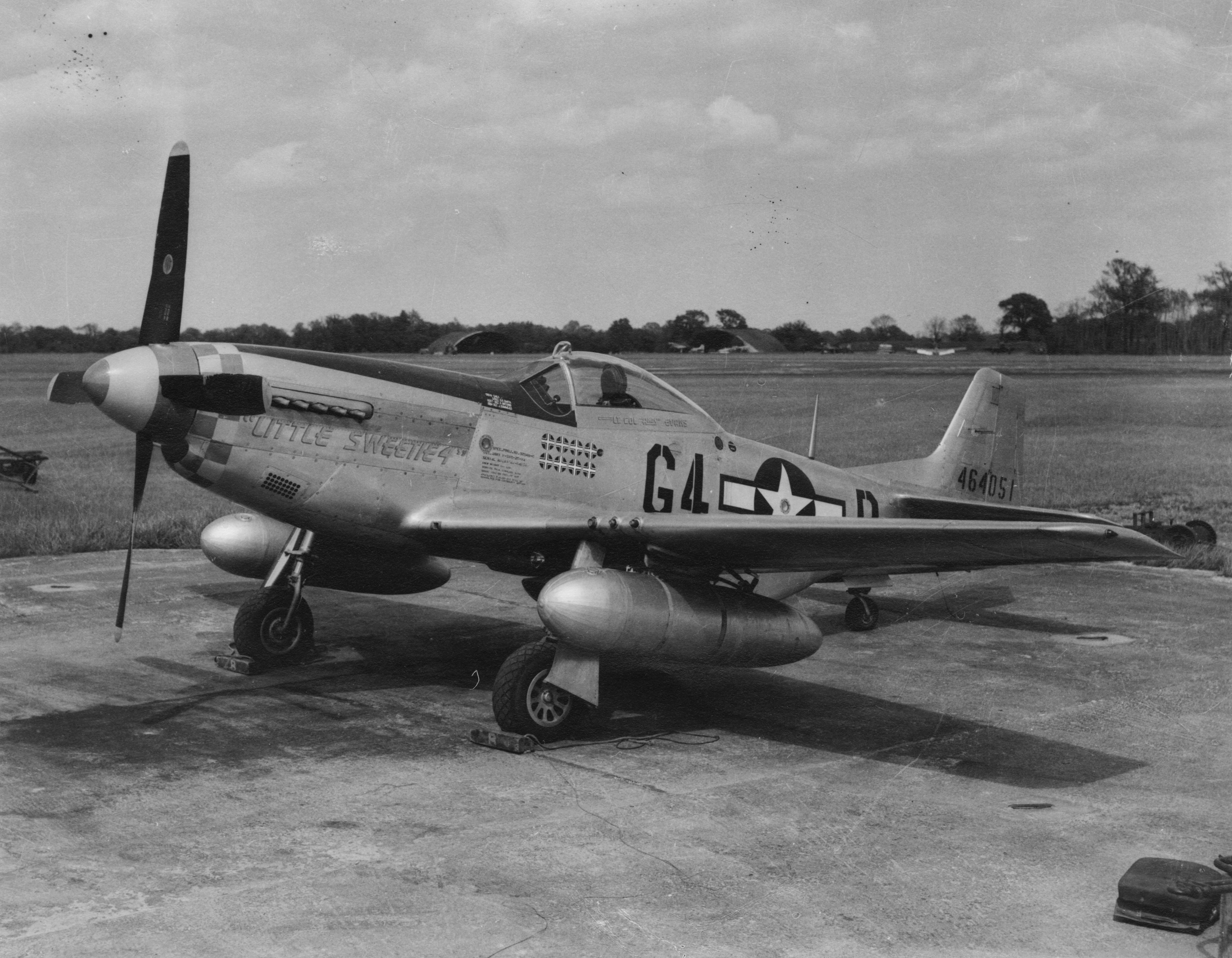
Evans' P-51 Mustang 'Little Sweetie 4'

Upon graduation from West Point, Evans attended United States Army Air Corps pilot training at Randolph Field, Texas. After the completion of his flight training, he served as a P-39 Airacobra pilot in Iceland. After his return to the United States, he commanded the 533d and 448th Fighter Squadrons, flying P-47 Thunderbolts. He attended the Command and General Staff School in Fort Leavenworth, Kansas, before being assigned to the 357th Fighter Group at RAF Leiston in England in the European Theater of Operations in the autumn of 1944. Flying P-51 Mustangs in aerial combat, he shot down a Focke-Wulf Fw 190 over Magdeburg, Germany, on November 27, 1944, his first aerial victory. His biggest day came on January 14, 1945, when he shot down four Fw 190s over Berlin, Germany, with overall 57½ German fighters shot down by fighter pilots of the 357th FG. His last aerial victory of the war was a Messerschmitt Bf 109 over Gütersloh, Germany, on March 24, 1945, his sixth overall aerial victory.

During World War II, Evans flew 129 combat missions and was credited with the destruction of 6 enemy aircraft in aerial combat, making him a flying ace, and 2 destroyed on the ground while strafing enemy airfields.

=== Interbellum ===
Following the end of World War II, Evans was appointed as commander of the 357th Fighter Group while based in Neubiberg, Germany. In 1946, he returned to the United States and from March 1946 to August 1947, he served in the staff of Air University at Maxwell Air Force Base, Alabama. He then attended the Air Command and Staff School from August 1947 to June 1948. Following that, he served on the Joint Staff at the Organization of the Joint Chiefs of Staff in Washington, D.C., from June 1948 to June 1950. Subsequently, he became the executive officer to the Chief of Staff of the U.S. Air Force, from July 1950 to July 1951, being appointed a full colonel in January. From August 1951 to June 1952, he attended the Air War College at Maxwell Air Force Base, Alabama.

=== Korean War ===
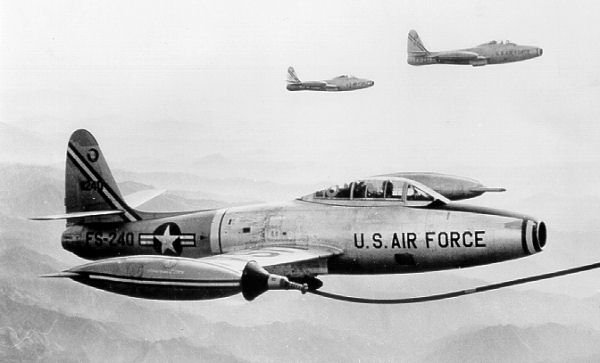
F-84s of the 49th FBW over Korea

In June 1952, Colonel Evans was appointed as the deputy commander of the 49th Fighter-Bomber Wing during the Korean War. Stationed at Taegu Air Base, South Korea, he flew missions in the F-84 Thunderjet. On his 67th mission on March 27, 1953, he was shot down and was held as a prisoner of war by communist forces, making him the highest ranking Air Force prisoner of the war. During his time as prisoner, he was held in solitary confinement and, after his captors discovered through the Stars and Stripes military newspaper that he had served with the USAF Chief of Staff, he was pressured to confess that he committed war crimes. He refused to do so and was subjected to torture. Evans was released from captivity in September 1953; until his release he was considered missing in action by the U.S. military.

=== Post war ===
After Evans's return to the United States in September 1953, he became a member of the faculty at the Air War College. In January 1956, he became commander of the 414th Fighter Group at Oxnard, California, which was equipped with F-89 Scorpions. From January 1957 to September 1959, he served as vice commander of the New York Air Defense Sector at McGuire Air Force Base, New Jersey, where he flew both F-89s and F-101 Voodoos. His next assignment was in July 1960 as commander of the 65th Air Division at Torrejon Air Base in Spain, where he flew F-102 Delta Daggers. In this position, he was responsible for conducting the joint air defense and training mission with the Spanish air defense commander.

Evans returned to the United States in October 1963 and was assigned to the Office of the Deputy Chief of Staff for Research and Development at the Headquarters of the U.S. Air Force in the Pentagon, as director of development planning. In June 1964, he became director of development with additional duty as special assistant to the deputy chief of staff for research and development for counterinsurgency. In August 1968 he was assigned as commander of the Air Force Tactical Air Warfare Center at Eglin Air Force Base in Florida.

During the Vietnam War, Evans flew combat missions in the F-4 Phantom II over North Vietnam. In October 1970, he assumed duties as deputy commander of the Seventh Air Force/Thirteenth Air Force, with headquarters at Udorn Royal Thai Air Force Base in Thailand. In July 1971, he was appointed as the commander of the U.S. Military Assistance Command, Thailand, and chief of the Joint U.S. Military Assistance Advisory Group in Thailand, his last military positions, before his retirement from the Air Force in 1973.

== Death ==
Evans died on Christmas Day 2001, at the age of 83. He was buried at Arlington National Cemetery with full military honors, next to his wife Claire who predeceased him in 1973. His funeral included a flyover of four F-15 Eagles.

== Aerial victory credits ==
| Date | # | Type | Location | Aircraft flown | Unit Assigned |
|---|---|---|---|---|---|
| November 27, 1944 | 1 | Focke-Wulf Fw 190 | Magdeburg, Germany | P-51D Mustang | 357 FG Hq |
| January 14, 1945 | 4 | Fw 190 | Berlin, Germany | P-51D | 357 FG Hq |
| March 24, 1945 | 1 | Messerschmitt Bf 109 | Gütersloh, Germany | P-51D | 357 FG Hq |
Source: Air Force Historical Study 85: USAF Credits for the Destruction of Enemy Aircraft, World War II

== Awards and decorations ==
His awards include:

USAF Command pilot badge
| Air Force Distinguished Service Medal with bronze oak leaf cluster |
| Silver Star |
| Legion of Merit with bronze oak leaf cluster |
| Distinguished Flying Cross with two bronze oak leaf clusters |
| Purple Heart |
| Air Medal with two silver and two bronze oak leaf clusters |
| Army Commendation Medal |
| Air Force Presidential Unit Citation |
| Air Force Outstanding Unit Award |
| Prisoner of War Medal (Note: In 1985, this medal was awarded retroactively to all U.S. military personnel who had been prisoners of war.) |
| American Defense Service Medal |
| American Campaign Medal |
| European-African-Middle Eastern Campaign Medal with four bronze campaign star |
| World War II Victory Medal |
| Army of Occupation Medal with 'Germany' clasp |
| National Defense Service Medal with bronze service star |
| Korean Service Medal with two bronze campaign stars |
| Vietnam Service Medal with bronze campaign star |
| Air Force Longevity Service Award with silver and bronze oak leaf clusters |
| Croix de Guerre with silver-gilt star (France) |
| Republic of Korea Presidential Unit Citation |
| Order of Military Merit, Eulji Medal with silver star (South Korea) |
| Republic of Vietnam Gallantry Cross Unit Citation |
| United Nations Service Medal for Korea |
| Vietnam Campaign Medal |
| Korean War Service Medal (Note: In 2000, this medal was awarded retroactively to all U.S. military personnel who had served in the Korean War.) |

=== Silver Star citation ===
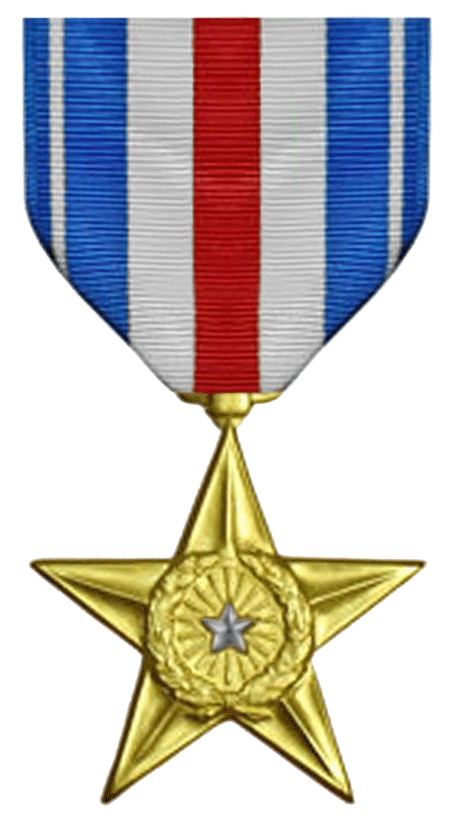

Evans Jr., Andrew J.
Colonel, U.S. Air Force
49th Fighter-Bomber Group, Fifth Air Force
Date of Action: March 14, 1953

Citation:

The President of the United States of America, authorized by Act of Congress, July 9, 1918, takes pleasure in presenting the Silver Star to Colonel Andrew Julius Evans, Jr., United States Air Force, for gallantry in action against an armed enemy as Group Leader of sixteen F-84 type aircraft of the 49th Fighter Bomber Group, Fifth Air Force, on 14 March 1953. On that date, Colonel Evans led an attack against heavily defended rail-bridges in northernmost North Korea. Leading the group directly to the target, Colonel Evans set-up his bomb pattern and proceeded to dive onto the target, positively marking it for the others in the group. Pulling out of the bomb run, Colonel Evans skillfully avoided the intense anti-aircraft fire, and proceeded south of the now totally destroyed rail-bridge to further harass the enemy. Sighting numerous boxcars and several vehicles, Colonel Evans called for a strafing attack. This attack continued under his competent direction until fuel consumption necessitated a quick return to the base. During this highly successful mission, the entire rail-bridge was destroyed, sixty-seven boxcars were damaged, one vehicle was destroyed, and four vehicles were damaged. Through his keen leadership and flying ability and exemplary devotion to duty, Colonel Evans was instrumental in seriously hampering the enemy's activity in that area, and reflected great credit upon himself, the Far East Air Forces, and the United States Air Force.
