= 53rd Weapons Evaluation Group =

United States Air Force unit

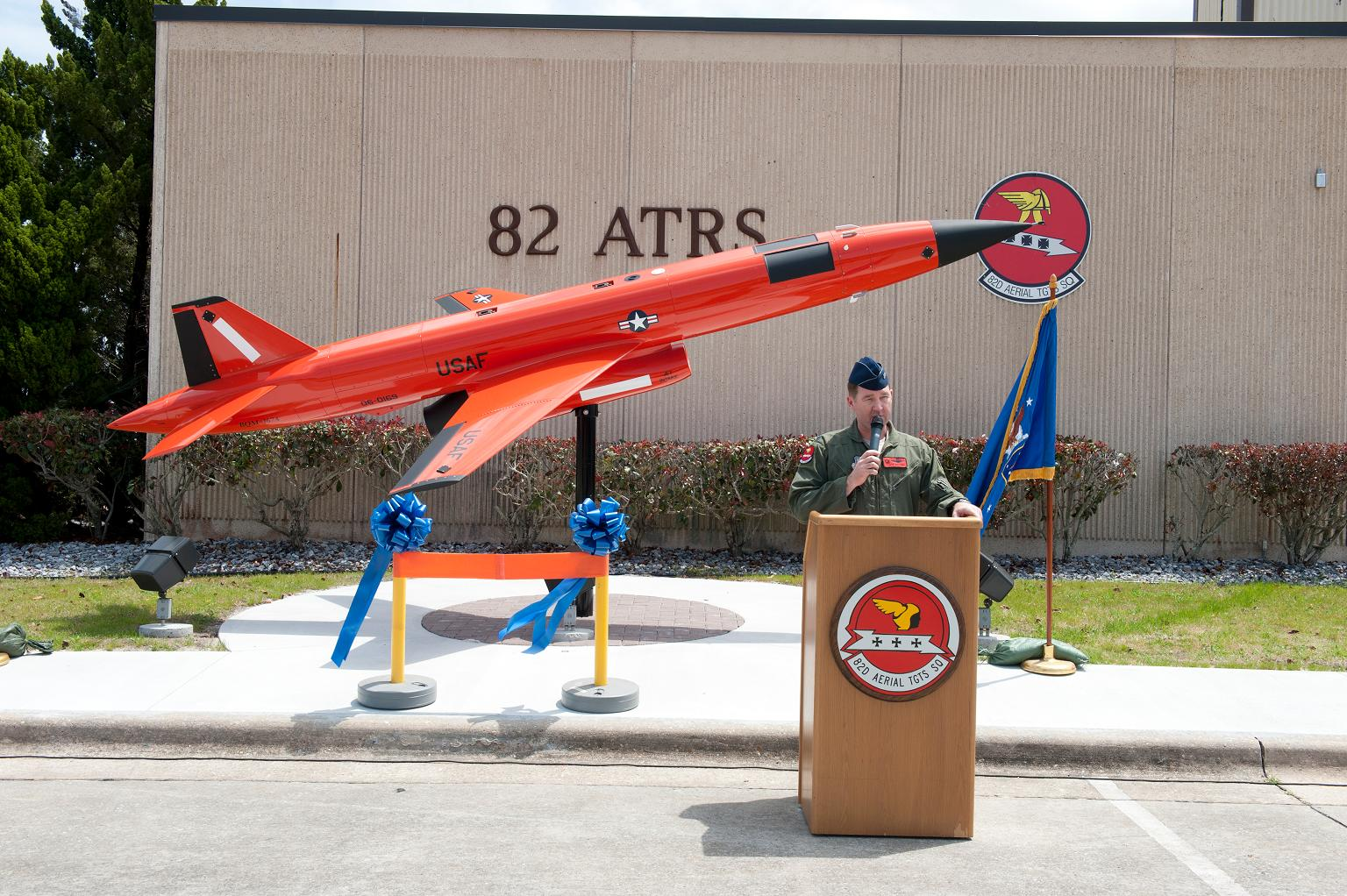
- BQM-167 Streaker of the group's 82nd Aerial Targets Squadron
- Active: 1943–1949; 1955–1958; 1983–1998; 1998–present
- Country: United States
- Branch: United States Air Force
- Role: Weapons evaluation
- Nickname: Satan's Angels (World War II)
- Motto: In Proelio Gaudete (Latin for 'Be Joyful in Battle')
- Engagements: Asiatic-Pacific Theater
- Decorations: Distinguished Unit Citation; Air Force Outstanding Unit Award; Air Force Organizational Excellence Award; Philippine Presidential Unit Citation

Commanders
- Current commander: Colonel Scott Crowell
- Notable commanders: Colonel Charles H. MacDonald; Lieutenant Colonel (later Colonel) John S. Loisel

Insignia
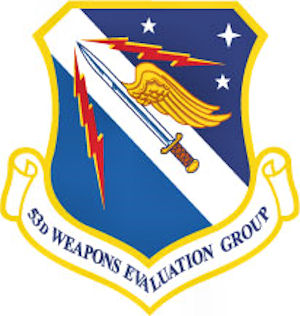
- 53rd Weapons Evaluation Group emblem (Note: While assigned to the 53rd Wing, the group uses the wing emblem with the group designation on the scroll. Robertson, AFHRA Factsheet. The group's own emblem and motto remain part of the group's heritage and if it is assigned other than to a wing with the same number as the group, it may resume them.)

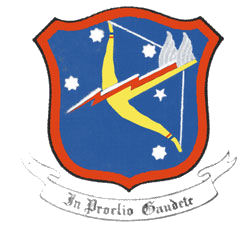
- 475th Fighter Group emblem (Note: Approved 26 November 1956.)

The 53rd Weapons Evaluation Group is a United States Air Force unit that reports to the 53rd Wing. It is stationed at Tyndall Air Force Base, Florida. The unit is part of Air Combat Command.

The unit was known as the 475th Fighter Group during World War II, when it operated primarily in the Southwest Pacific Theater. The 475th was perhaps the best known of the theater's Lockheed P-38 Lightning groups since its personnel included one of the top flying aces in the Pacific, Thomas McGuire. (38 kills), a Medal of Honor recipients.

By the war's end, 38 other pilots from the 475th had achieved ace status in P-38s. The group's commander for 20 months, Colonel Charles H. MacDonald, scored 27 kills in his famous "Putt Putt Maru" and was the seventh-ranking American ace.

The group remained in the Far East until 1949 as part of the occupation forces.

From 1955 to 1956, the group was an Air Defense Command interceptor group stationed at Minneapolis-St Paul International Airport. It was inactivated in 1958 when the United States Air Force withdrew its regular units from this civilian field.

As the 475th Weapons Evaluation Group, then the 53rd Weapons Evaluation Group, the group has performed its current mission at Tyndall since 1983.

== Overview ==
The 53rd Weapons Evaluation Group is made up of five squadrons and two detachments and conducts the Air Force's air-to-air weapon system evaluation program, known as Combat Archer, and the Air Force's air-to-ground weapon system evaluation program, known as Combat Hammer. It also supports weapons instructor air-to-air training. Unit personnel provide all Air Force aerial target support for United States Department of Defense (DoD) users in the Gulf Ranges and targets for testing at the White Sands Missile Range in New Mexico. The group also plans, manages and executes the United States Air Force (USAF) air-to-air Weapons Meet, William Tell.

== Units ==
- 53rd Test Support Squadron. The 53rd is responsible for technical and staff functions to support USAF's air-to-air and air-to-ground operational test programs, including the weapon system evaluation program and other DoD weapons tests. It also provides technical, engineering, acquisition, logistics, data automation (local area network, system configuration control) and strategic planning support for the group. It manages programs for all Gulf Range air-to-air systems, range control systems, aerial target systems and payloads, missile scoring and data analysis telemetry, and communications systems. It is also the primary manager for the USAF air-to-air weapons meet, William Tell.
- 81st Air Control Squadron. Air Combat Command's only radar control squadron tasked to support live-fire testing and evaluation of air-to-air weapons against targets designed to represent anticipated threats. Using the call sign "Wetstone", it provides technical and ground-controlled interception support to Air Force's air-to-air operational test and evaluation programs including the weapon system evaluation program and other DoD weapons tests. It provides range control and flight safety monitoring for more than 330 live missile firings and 3,000 combat training and test sorties annually. The squadron is responsible for the daily operation of the range control system, and directs acquisition, logistics and budgeting for range control system modernization.
- 82nd Aerial Targets Squadron. The 82nd operates DoD's only full-scale aerial target program, maintaining 50 modified QF-16 drone aircraft for this purpose. It also provides Composite Materials BQM-167 Streaker subscale aerial targets at Tyndall Air Force Base. These full-scale and subscale targets are provided to USAF, Navy, and Army customers for developmental and operational tests. The squadron also provides target support for the USAF weapon evaluation program, the USAF weapons instructor course, and William Tell. The squadron maintains three 120-foot drone recovery vessels and two smaller patrol vessels to recover aerial targets and support range safety and salvage operations. Squadron members also operate the Air Force's only two DeHavilland E-9A Widget airborne surveillance and telemetry relay aircraft. These aircraft provide ocean surface surveillance and relay missile and target telemetry for over-the-horizon coverage of the Gulf Range and also support over-land telemetry missions for the weapons system evaluation program at Holloman Air Force Base, New Mexico, and the Utah Test and Training Range near Hill Air Force Base. The squadron is a mix of contract personnel and military personnel. The squadron's Detachment 1 at Holloman operates and maintains some QF-4s for use on the White Sands Missile Range. In addition to Air Force programs, the detachment also supports Army surface-to-air missile programs and foreign military customers.
- 83rd Fighter Weapons Squadron. The 83rd conducts the Air Force air-to-air weapon system evaluation program. It evaluates the total weapons system including aircraft, weapon delivery system, weapon, aircrew, support equipment, technical data and maintenance. The squadron hosts 38 weapon evaluation program deployments annually at Tyndall. It evaluates all Air Force air-to-air capabilities for the AIM-120 Advanced Medium Range Air-to-Air Missile, the AIM-9 Sidewinder missile and aircraft guns, and also provides live missile training for combat USAF crews as a secondary objective. Squadron personnel verify weapon system performance, determine reliability, evaluate capability and limitations, identify deficiencies, recommend corrective action, and maintain data. The squadron investigates missile envelopes and evaluates capabilities and limitations to determine future firing requirements. They provide liaison support for forces participating in weapon system evaluation program, William Tell and WIC missile firing programs.
- 86th Fighter Weapons Squadron. The 86th conducts the Air Force air-to-ground weapon system evaluation program. It evaluates air-to-ground precision guided munitions including weapon buildup, weapon loading, aircraft, aircrew employment procedures, support equipment, technical data and maintenance actions. The squadron hosts active duty and Air National Guard weapon system evaluation program deployments at Eglin Air Force Base and Hill Air Force Base. The annual launching of 450-plus precision guided munitions evaluates the Air Force's air-to-ground precision capabilities and also provides full-scale precision guided munition employment training for combat Air Force crews as a secondary objective. (Note: The weapons being evaluated as of October 2012 include the GBU-10 and GBU-12 Paveway II, GBU-24 and GBU-27 Paveway III, GBU-28, GBU-31 Joint Direct Attack Munition, AGM-65 Maverick, AGM-86 Conventional Air Launched Cruise Missile, AGM-154 Joint Standoff Weapon, AGM-88 High-Speed Antiradiation Missile, and the Wind Corrected Munitions Dispenser.) Squadron personnel verify weapon system performance, determine reliability, evaluate capability and limitations, identify deficiencies, recommend corrective action, and maintain Combat Air Force-wide data. The squadron investigates precision guided munition envelopes and evaluates capabilities and limitations to determine future employment requirements. It provides liaison support for pre-deployment, employment, and redeployment of Air Combat Command, United States Air Forces in Europe, Pacific Air Forces, Air National Guard, and Air Force Reserve assets participating in WSEP.

== History ==
=== World War II ===
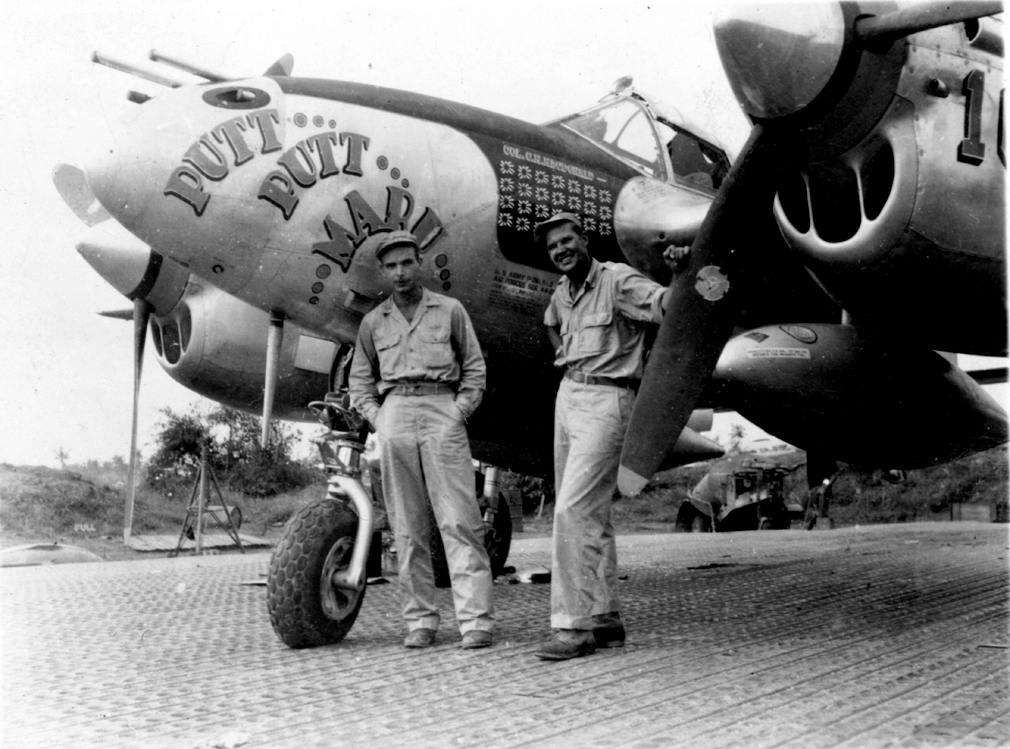
Col. MacDonald and Al Nelson next to his Lockheed P-38L "Putt Putt Maru(V)", 44-25471.

In 1943 Japanese air strength in the South West Pacific theatre of World War II was powerful, and they were capable of launching large scale attacks against Allied ground forces and installations at any time. On New Guinea, the Japanese had many bases from which to launch their air strikes.

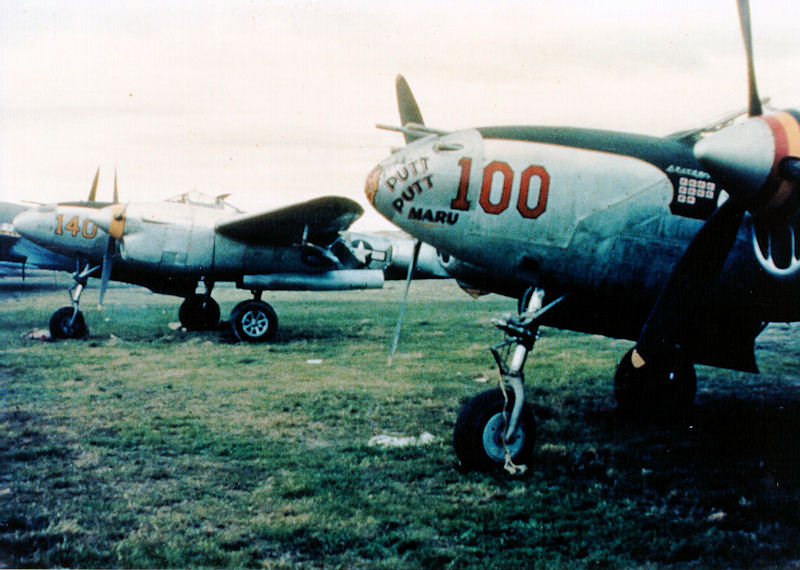
Foreground is P-38J Putt Putt Maru, serial 42-104024. Also shown is P-38L Blood & Guts, serial 44-25600

The swiftest and most effective means of gaining control of the air was to bomb those Japanese strongholds and destroy as many aircraft on the ground as possible. Such bombing strikes could best be accomplished during daylight hours, when fighter escort was essential. The only fighter aircraft then in the Southwest Pacific with sufficient range to escort bombers to and from Rabaul and Wewak was the Lockheed P-38 Lightning. However, the limited P-38 strength in the Fifth Air Force in April 1943 consisted of only three squadrons, (the 80th Fighter Squadron of the 8th Fighter Group; the 39th Fighter Squadron of the 35th Fighter Group; and the 9th Fighter Squadron of the 49th Fighter Group). The limited number of spare Lightnings available during late 1942 and early 1943 had to be used to make up attrition in these squadrons.

To augment the small force, the 475th Fighter Group was activated in Australia as a P-38 unit on 14 May 1943 at Amberley Airfield in Queensland, Australia. The operational squadrons of the 475th were the 431st, 432d and 433d Fighter Squadrons. However, the continuing shortage of P-38s forced the 35th and 49th Fighter Groups to convert their single P-38 squadrons to P-47Ds, thus leaving the Fifth Air Force at the end of 1943 with only the 475th Fighter Group, and the 80th Fighter Squadron of the 8th Fighter Group.

The group was specifically trained to provide long-range escort for bombers during daylight raids on Japanese airfields and strongholds in the Netherlands East Indies and the Bismarck Archipelago. On 14 August 1943, the 475th Fighter Group and its 431st, 432d and 433d Fighter Squadrons transferred from Amberley Airfield to the Dobodura Airfield Complex, in New Guinea. The 431st and 432d operated from Port Moresby. The 431st operated until October 1943 and the 432d until September 1943. The 433d squadron flew its first mission on 15 August 1943.

The 475th received a Distinguished Unit Citation (DUC) for missions in August 1943 when the group not only protected North American B-25 Mitchells that were engaged in strafing attacks on airdromes at Wewak but also destroyed a number of the enemy fighter planes that attacked the formation.

The group received a second DUC for intercepting and destroying many of the planes the Japanese sent against American shipping in Oro Bay on 15 and 17 October 1943. It covered landings in New Guinea, New Britain, and the Schouten Islands. After moving to Mokmer Airfield on Biak Island in July 1944, the group flew escort missions and fighter sweeps to the southern Philippines, Celebes, Halmahera, and Borneo.

For a while, the 475th included among its personnel the famous pilot Charles Lindbergh. He was serving with the Group as a technical representative from the United Aircraft Corporation. Lindbergh flew a number of combat missions with the Group in June/August 1944 as a civilian to instruct pilots on how to use cruise control to get maximum range and endurance from their P-38Js. On 28 July, Lindbergh was credited with shooting down a Japanese Mitsubishi Ki-51 over Elpaputih Bay in the Netherlands East Indies in a 433rd Fighter Squadron P-38 42-104995.

The group moved to the Philippines in October 1944 and received another DUC for bombing and strafing enemy airfields and installations, escorting bombers, and engaging in aerial combat during the first stages of the Allied campaign to recover the Philippines, October–December 1944.

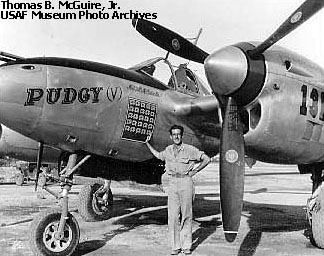
Major Thomas McGuire of the 431st Fighter Squadron next to his Lockheed P-38J "Pudgy (V)" (44-24155)

Major Thomas B. McGuire, Jr. was awarded the Medal of Honor for missions on 25 and 26 December 1944 leading flights of P-38's escorting bombers that struck Mabalacat Airdrome and Clark Field. He scored three confirmed victories on that Christmas day, and on the following day, he scored four more against Japanese fighters. On 7 January 1945, while attempting to save a fellow flyer from attack during a fighter sweep over Negros Island in the Philippines, Maj McGuire risked a hazardous maneuver at low altitude, crashed, and was killed.

The group flew many missions to support ground forces on Luzon during the first part of 1945. It also flew escort missions to China and attacked railways on Formosa. It began moving to Ie Shima near Okinawa in August but the war ended before the movement was completed.

During World War II, the 475th Fighter Group was engaged in combat for approximately two years. The group completed 3042 missions, (21,701 Sorties) and shot down 551 Japanese aircraft. On the other hand, the Group lost only 56 Planes to the Japanese. During the war, the Group took part in seven campaigns, and was awarded three Distinguished Unit Citations for outstanding performance of duty in action. In addition to Major McGuire, the unit boasted such aces of the Pacific War as Col. Charles MacDonald (27), Capt. Daniel T. Roberts (14), Lt. Francis J. Lent (11), Lt. Col. John S. Loisel (11), Capt. Elliot Summer (10), plus many more.

475th Fighter Gp

Aerial Victories	Number	Note
Group Hq	43
431st Fighter Squadron	212
432nd Fighter Squadron	167
433rd Fighter Squadron	107
Group Total	542

=== Occupation ===
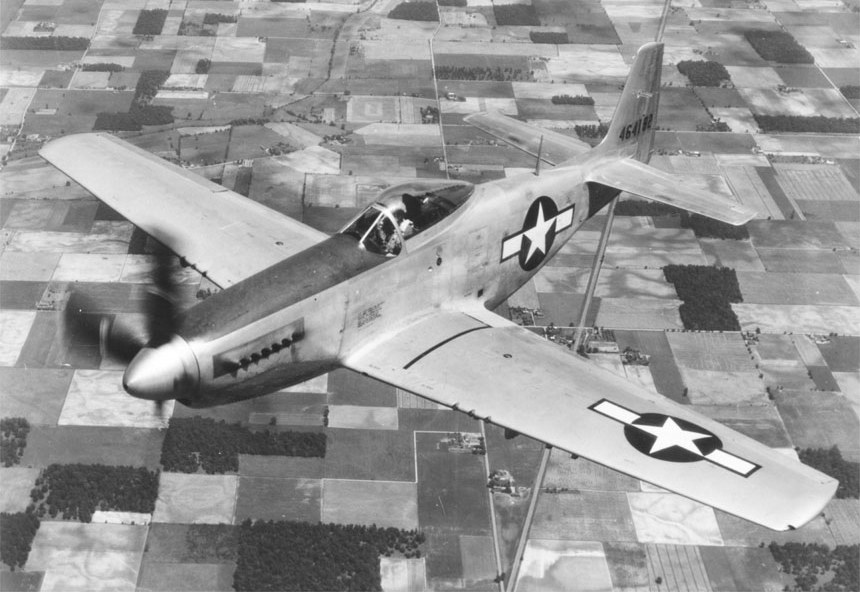
Long-range North American P-51H 44-644182

After active combat ended, on 22 September 1945, the 475th moved to Seoul Airfield, Korea for occupation duty as part of the 308th Bombardment Wing of Far East Air Forces (FEAF). The group moved to Kimpo Airfield on 7 January 1946, where it converted to the long-range P-51H Mustang. The following March, the group added an airlift mission when the 46th Troop Carrier Squadron at Kimpo was detached from its parent group in Japan and attached to the 475th. In November 1947, the 433rd Fighter Squadron moved to Itazuke Airfield and was detached to the 347th Fighter Group.

However, in August 1948 the group joined the 433rd at Itazuke and the squadron returned to the group's control. The same month, FEAF organized its combat units under the wing base organization system and the group became a subordinate unit of 475th Fighter Wing, as did the units supporting it. The 475th Fighter Group was inactivated on 1 April 1949 at Ashiya Air Base, Japan.

=== Cold War ===
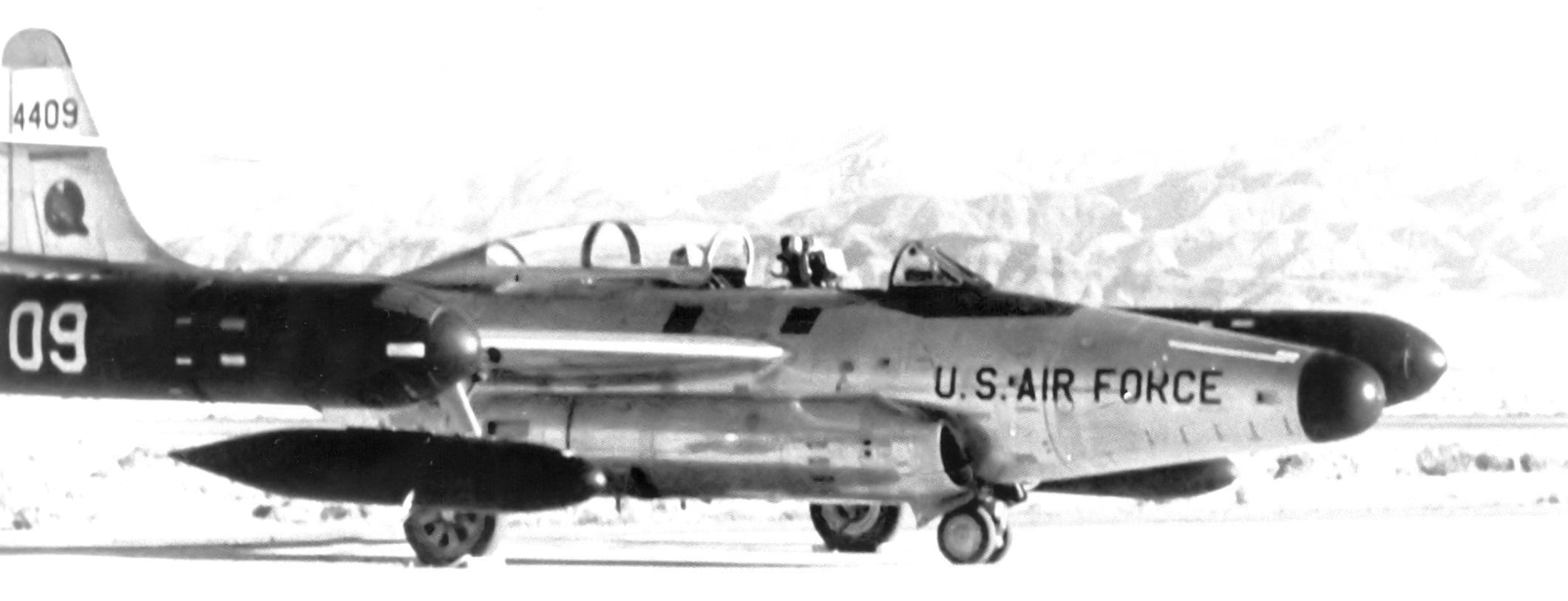
F-89H of the group's 432nd Fighter-Interceptor Squadron during Operation Plumbbob

In 1955, Air Defense Command (ADC) implemented Project Arrow, which was designed to bring back on the active list the fighter units which had compiled memorable records in the two world wars. As part of this project, on 18 August 1955, the 475th Fighter Group (Air Defense) was activated at Minneapolis-Saint Paul International Airport, where it assumed the mission, personnel and equipment of the 514th Air Defense Group, which was simultaneously inactivated. Because Project Arrow was also intended to unite squadrons with their historical groups, the 432nd Fighter-Interceptor Squadron moved on paper from Truax Field, Wisconsin to join the group at Minneapolis, where it replaced the 337th Fighter-Interceptor Squadron, which departed for McGuire Air Force Base, New Jersey. The group also assumed host responsibility for regular USAF units at Minneapolis and was assigned several support units to carry out this responsibility. The group took over the 514th's airborne interception radar equipped and Mighty Mouse rocket armed Northrop F-89D Scorpions. By June 1956, the group was flying a mix of F-89Ds and F-89H's. The H model could carry AIM-4 Falcons in addition to the unguided Mighty Mice. Two months later the group was completely equipped with H models. In the late 1950s, ADC began withdrawing from civilian airports, partly because of security concerns arising from the nuclear capability its interceptor aircraft were beginning to acquire. In January 1958, the group and its subordinate units were inactivated.

=== Modern era ===
From 1983 to the present, group responsibilities included management of the Air Force weapon system evaluation program, range control for live-firing missile programs on the Gulf Range, and providing aerial targets support for special test projects, which included full-scale and sub-scale drones.

== Lineage ==
475th Fighter Group

- Constituted as the 475th Fighter Group (Twin Engine) on 7 May 1943 (Note: Per Robertson, in the AFHRA Factsheet. However, Maurer states that the group was not constituted until 15 May, the day after Fifth Air Force activated the group, and that Fifth had special authority granted to it to form the unit in the combat zone before the War Department constituted it. Maurer, Combat Units, p. 347.)

Activated on 14 May 1943
Redesignated 475th Fighter Group, Twin Engine on 20 August 1943
Redesignated 475th Fighter Group, c. 29 December 1943
Inactivated on 1 April 1949
Redesignated 475th Fighter Group (Air Defense) on 20 June 1955
Activated on 18 August 1955
Inactivated on 2 January 1958
Redesignated 475th Weapons Evaluation Group on 14 October 1983
Activated on 15 October 1983
Inactivated on 20 November 1998
Consolidated with the 53rd Weapons Evaluation Group as the 53rd Weapons Evaluation Group on 25 July 2000

53rd Weapons Evaluation Group

- Constituted as the 53rd Weapons Evaluation Group on 1 November 1998

Activated on 20 November 1998
Consolidated with the 475th Weapons Evaluation Group on 25 July 2000
Consolidated Group retains designation 53rd Weapons Evaluation Group

=== Assignments ===
- V Fighter Command, 14 May 1943

Attached to: First Air Task Force, c. 14 August 1943-c. 31 January 1944
Attached to: 308 Bombardment Wing, c. 1 February-24 March 1944
Attached to: 310th Bombardment Wing, c. 14 May – 16 June 1944

- 85th Fighter Wing, 16 June 1944
- V Fighter Command, 18 May 1945

Attached to: 309th Bombardment Wing, 29 May-23 September 1945
Attached to: 308th Bombardment Wing, c. 23 September 1945-c. 31 January 1946

- 308th Bombardment Wing, c. 1 February 1946
- Fifth Air Force, 22 March 1947
- 475th Fighter Wing, 18 August 1948 – 1 April 1949
- 31st Air Division, 18 August 1955 – 2 January 1958
- USAF Air Defense Weapons Center, 15 October 1983
- USAF Tactical Air Warfare Center (later, USAF Air Warfare Center; 53rd Wing), 23 January 1991 – 20 November 1998
- 53rd Wing, 20 November 1998 – present

=== Components ===
- 46th Troop Carrier Squadron: (attached 22 March 1947 – c. 1 August 1948)
- 80th Fighter Squadron: (attached 13 December 1943 – 24 February 1944) (Note: So in Robertson, Factsheet 53 Weapons Evaluation Group. However, Maurer, Combat Squadrons, pp. 282–83;)
- 81st Range Control Squadron (later Test Support Squadron, Range Control Squadron): 15 October 1983 – 20 November 1998, 20 November 1998 – present
- 82nd Tactical Aerial Targets Squadron (later, 82nd Aerial Targets Squadron): 15 October 1983 – 20 November 1998, 20 November 1998 – present

Detachment 1 at Holloman Air Force Base, New Mexico

- 83rd Fighter Weapons Squadron: 15 October 1983 – 20 November 1998, 20 November 1998 – present
- 84th Test Squadron (later Test and Evaluation Squadron), 15 April 1993 – 1 April 2001
- 86th Fighter Weapons Squadron: 23 August 1999 – present

Eglin Air Force Base, Florida
Detachment 1 at Hill Air Force Base, Utah

- 431st Fighter Squadron: 14 May 1943 – 1 April 1949 (detached 15 November 1947 – 28 August 1948)
- 432nd Fighter Squadron (later 432nd Fighter-Interceptor Squadron): 14 May 1943 – 1 April 1949; 18 August 1955 – 2 January 1958
- 433rd Fighter Squadron: 14 May 1943 – 1 April 1949 (not operational, 1 November 1945 – 17 April 1946 and 18 July 1946 – 11 September 1946; detached to 347th Fighter Group 18 November 1947 – 28 August 1948)
- 475th USAF Infirmary (later 475th USAF Dispensary): 18 August 1955 – 1 April 1960
- 475th Air Base Squadron: 18 August 1955 – 2 January 1958
- 475th Consolidated Aircraft Maintenance Squadron: 8 July 1957 – 2 January 1958
- 475th Materiel Squadron: 18 August 1955 – 2 January 1958
- 475th Test Support Squadron (later 53rd Test Support Squadron): 15 October 1983 – 20 November 1998, 28 January 2004 – present

=== Stations ===
- Amberley Airfield, Australia, 14 May 1943
- Dobodura Airfield Complex, New Guinea, 14 August 1943
- Nadzab Airfield Complex, New Guinea, 24 March 1944
- Hollandia Airfield Complex, Netherlands East Indies, 15 May 1944
- Mokmer Airfield, Biak Island, Netherlands East Indies, c. 14 July 1944
- Dulag Airfield, Leyte, Philippines, 28 October 1944
- McGuire Field, Mindoro, Philippines, 5 February 1945
- Clark Field, Luzon, Philippines, 28 February 1945
- Lingayen Airfield, Luzon, Philippines, c. 20 April 1945
- Ie Shima Airfield, Ryukyu Islands, 8 August 1945
- Kimpo Airfield, South Korea, c. 23 September 1945
- Itazuke Air Base, Japan, 28 August 1948
- Ashiya Air Base, Japan, 25 March-1 April 1949
- Minneapolis-Saint Paul International Airport, Minnesota, 18 August 1955 – 2 January 1958
- Tyndall AFB, Florida, 15 October 1983 – 20 November 1998; 20 November 1998 – present

=== Aircraft ===
- P-38 Lightning, 1943–1946
- P-51 Mustang, 1946–1949
- F-89 Scorpion, 1955–1958
- F-15 Eagle, 1994–1998, 1998–present
- F-117 Nighthawk, 1993–1998, 1998–2006
- HH-60 Pave Hawk, 1997–1998, 1998–present
- DeHavilland E-9A Widget

Drones

- QF-102 Delta Dagger, 1983–1984
- QF-100 Super Sabre, 1983–1993; QF-106, 1991–1996
- QF-4 Phantom II, 1996–1998, 1998 – 2016
- QF-16, 2013–present
- Numerous subscale drones, 1983–1998, 1998–present

=== Awards and campaigns ===
Award streamer	Award	Dates	Notes
	Distinguished Unit Citation	18 and 21 August 1943	475th Fighter Group, New Guinea
	Distinguished Unit Citation	15 and 17 October 1943	475th Fighter Group, New Guinea
	Distinguished Unit Citation	25 October 1944-25 December 1944	475th Fighter Group, Philippines
	Air Force Outstanding Unit Award	1 November 1986-31 October 1988	475th Weapons Evaluation Group
	Air Force Outstanding Unit Award	1 January 1994-31 May 1995	475th Weapons Evaluation Group
	Air Force Outstanding Unit Award	1 June 1999-31 May 2000	53rd Weapons Evaluation Group
	Air Force Outstanding Unit Award	1 June 2002–31 May 2004	53rd Weapons Evaluation Group
	Air Force Outstanding Unit Award	1 June 2004–31 May 2006	53rd Weapons Evaluation Group
	Air Force Organizational Excellence Award	1 January 1992-31 December 1993	475th Weapons Evaluation Group
	Philippine Republic Presidential Unit Citation	17 October 1944-4 July 1945	475th Fighter Group

Campaign Streamer	Campaign	Dates	Notes
	Air Combat, Asiatic-Pacific Theater	14 May 1943 – 2 March 1946	475th Fighter Group
	China Defensive	14 May 1943 – 4 May 1945	475th Fighter Group
	New Guinea	14 May 1943 – 31 December 1944	475th Fighter Group
	Bismarck Archipelago	15 December 1943 – 27 November 1944	475th Fighter Group
	Western Pacific	17 April 1944 – 2 September 1945	475th Fighter Group
	Leyte	17 October 1944 – 1 July 1945	475th Fighter Group
	Luzon	15 December 1944 – 4 July 1945	475th Fighter Group
	Southern Philippines	27 February 1945 – 4 July 1945	475th Fighter Group
	China Offensive	5 May 1945 – 2 September 1945	475th Fighter Group
	World War II Army of Occupation	3 September 1945 – 1 April 1949	475th Fighter Group
