= Charles H. MacDonald =

United States Air Force officer

Charles Henry "Mac" MacDonald
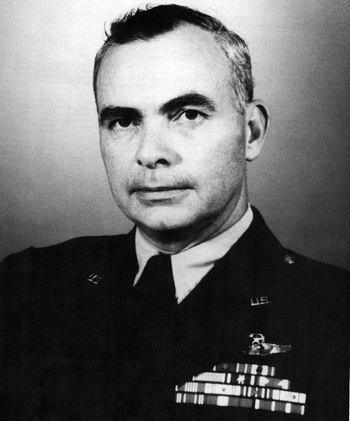
- Col. Charles H. MacDonald
- Born: November 23, 1914; DuBois, Pennsylvania, U.S.
- Died: March 3, 2002 (aged 87)
- Military career
- Allegiance: United States
- Branch: United States Army Air Corps; United States Army Air Forces; United States Air Force
- Service years: 1938–1961
- Rank: Colonel
- Nickname: "Mac"
- Units: 55th Pursuit Group; 18th Pursuit Group; 326th Fighter Group; 348th Fighter Group
- Commands: 340th Pursuit Squadron; 475th Fighter Group; 33rd Fighter Group; 23rd Fighter Wing
- Conflicts: World War II
- Awards: Distinguished Service Cross (2); Silver Star (2); Legion of Merit; Distinguished Flying Cross (6); Air Medal (11)

Colonel Charles Henry "Mac" MacDonald (November 23, 1914 – March 3, 2002) was a United States Air Force officer and a fighter ace of World War II. MacDonald commanded the 475th Fighter Group for 20 months in his P-38 Lightning, "Putt Putt Maru", and became the third ranking fighter ace in the Pacific during World War II.

== Early life ==
MacDonald was born in DuBois, Pennsylvania, on November 23, 1914. He entered the U.S. Army Air Corps pilot training program after graduating from Louisiana State University in 1938.

He received his flight wings and was commissioned a Second Lieutenant at Kelly Field, Texas, on May 25, 1939. His first assignment was to the 55th Pursuit Group, he later transferred to the 18th Pursuit Group at Wheeler Field, Hawaii on February 9, 1941, and was at Pearl Harbor on December 7, 1941.

After flying patrol for an hour and a half, MacDonald and his small group of planes headed back to Hawaii, but encountered a fierce hail of flak from nervous and shaken gunners. MacDonald had to run the gauntlet in order to land his aircraft.

He remained in Hawaii until early 1943, and was sent back to the United States to help train a P-47 Thunderbolt squadron in Massachusetts.

== World War II ==
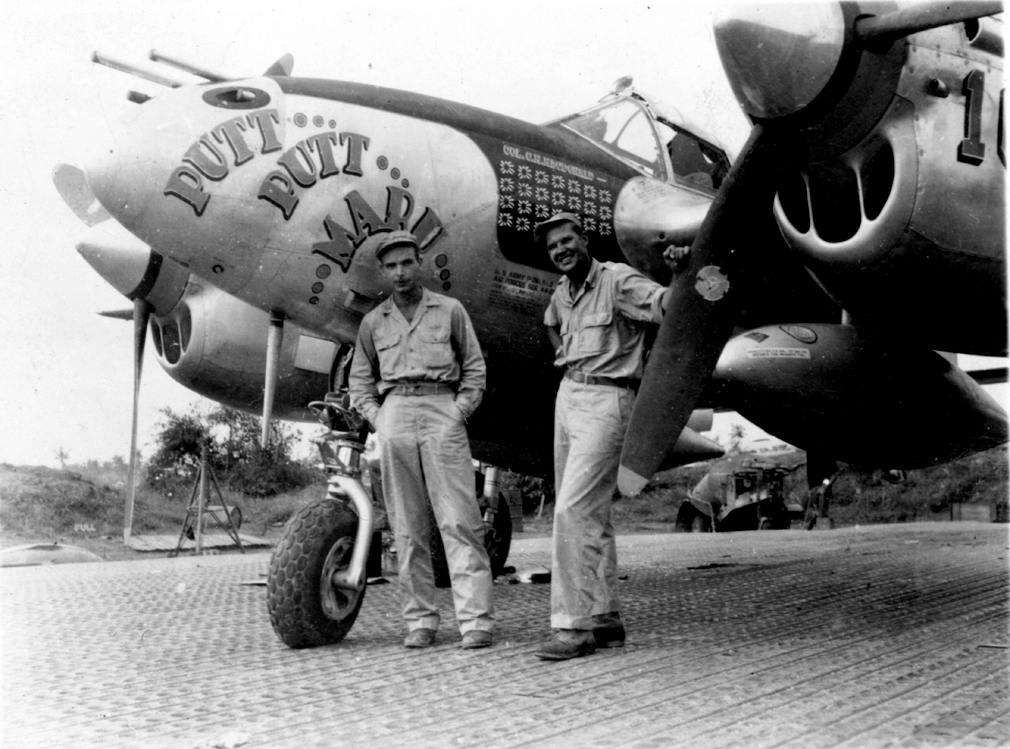
MacDonald and Al Nelson in the Pacific with MacDonald's P-38J Lightning "Putt Putt Maru"

MacDonald then served in the United States with the 326th Fighter Group before transferring to the 348th Fighter Group to command the 340th Pursuit Squadron at Westover Field, Massachusetts.

On October 1, 1943, then a major, joined the 475th Fighter Group at Dobodura, New Guinea as the group executive officer. He scored his first four victories that month and became an ace on November 9, 1943, when he downed two Zekes near Alexishafen Airdrome. He was promoted to lieutenant colonel the following day on November 10, 1943, and became the group commander.

While he was CO of the 432nd Squadron, MacDonald demonstrated his leadership on an October 25 mission to Rabaul. While leading a formation of P-38's flying escort for some B-24 Liberators on a Rabaul strike, heavy weather closed in, and all P-38's except MacDonald's flight turned back. Suddenly, the weather cleared and the formation of B-24's, with hardly an escort, was attacked by A6M Zeros.

MacDonald and his flight darted in and out of the bomber formation, clearing the Zeros from the bombers tails. They couldn't spend time finishing off damaged enemy aircraft nor confirming kills. Through their skill and diligence, they prevented many bombers from being shot down. But another pilot could confirm one kill by MacDonald, a Zero, his fourth aerial victory overall. For his actions, he was awarded the Distinguished Service Cross.

MacDonald moved up to Group Commander in Nov. 1943, replacing George Prentice who was rotated home. Leading the group for 20 months, Colonel "Mac" flew his P-38, Putt-Putt-Maru, with the unit number "100."

During early April, he led the 475th on missions over the Japanese stronghold of Hollandia, in northwest Guinea; by the end of the month, it had fallen.

In mid 1944, General George Kenney arranged for Charles A. Lindbergh to visit and fly with the 475th. He was able to teach the P-38 pilots to increase their operational range by 50%. During his stay with the 475th, he and MacDonald became good friends, and earned MacDonald's respect as an excellent pilot.

On July 28, 1944, Lindbergh flew on an apparent milk run with MacDonald. However, this "uneventful" mission became a sticky situation. A Japanese fighter broke through their formation and set his sights on Lindbergh's P-38. They were on a collision course, guns blazing from both airplanes, when at the last moment, Lindbergh pulled up. The badly damaged Japanese fighter could not follow, stalled, and spun into the sea.

On a subsequent mission, a flight of P-38s led by MacDonald was attacked multiple times by several enemy fighters. The last of these, having hidden in nearby clouds, dove down onto Lindbergh’s tail and was shot down in a headon pass by MacDonald just in the nick of time. That ended civilian Lindbergh’s combat career and nearly ended MacDonald's.

General Paul Wurtsmith put MacDonald on a one-month "punitive leave" for allowing the national hero to get into a dangerous situation. MacDonald returned to the 475th in time to lead the group during the momentous events surrounding the liberation of the Philippines.

He flew several sorties over Philippine Islands and shot down thirteen of his kills in the seven weeks between Nov. 10, 1944 and Jan. 1, 1945. One of his most memorable missions occurred on 25 December 1944 when he destroyed three Japanese fighters over Clark Field in the Philippines. He scored his last aerial victory on 13 March 1945, bringing his total to 27.

He finished the war with 27 confirmed victories, making him the third highest ranking U.S. Army fighter pilot of the Pacific Theater.

== Later life ==
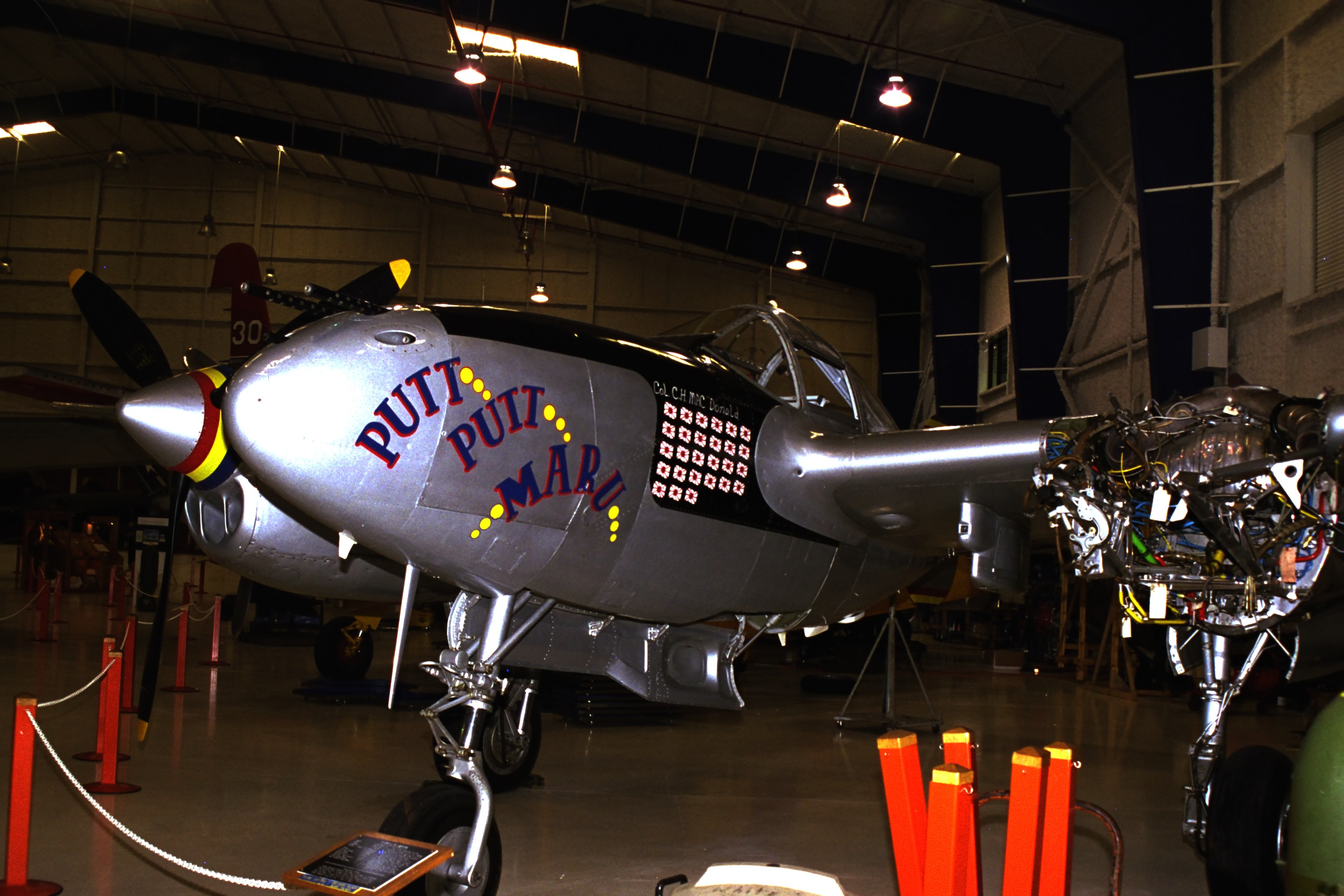
P-38 Lightning Putt Putt Maru at the Lone Star Flight Museum in Galveston

MacDonald returned to the United States in July 1945 where he served in various staff and command assignments, including the 33rd Fighter Group and 23rd Fighter Wing commander, Air Attaché to Sweden, and instructor at the US War College in Washington, D.C. before retiring from the Air Force as a colonel in July 1961.

Colonel MacDonald's retirement ceremony at McChord AFB near Tacoma, Washington, included a performance by the USAF Thunderbirds and a declaration of 'Col. Charles MacDonald Day.' He then moved to Anacortes, Washington, where he opened a real estate business selling island properties in Puget Sound (an excuse to pursue his love of sailing), and his four children finished high school.

In 1971, he closed his real estate business, sailed to Mexico, and in 1973, returned to San Diego, California, where he and his wife sold his boat and spent the next year building a new boat, after which Colonel MacDonald and his wife spent their time sailing the Pacific and the Caribbean until her death in 1978. In 1985 he came ashore and settled first in Pass Christian, Mississippi and then in DeFuniak Springs, Florida.

He died on March 3, 2002, at the age of 87.

== Decorations ==
His awards and decorations include:

USAF Command pilot badge
Distinguished Service Cross with bronze oak leaf cluster	Silver Star with bronze oak leaf cluster	
Legion of Merit	Distinguished Flying Cross with bronze oak leaf cluster	Air Medal with two silver oak leaf clusters
Air Force Commendation Medal	Army Commendation Medal	Air Presidential Unit Citation with two bronze oak leaf clusters
American Defense Service Medal with service star	American Campaign Medal	Asiatic-Pacific Campaign Medal with one silver and three bronze campaign stars
World War II Victory Medal	National Defense Service Medal with service star	Air Force Longevity Service Award with four bronze oak leaf clusters
Philippine Liberation Medal with two service stars	Philippine Independence Medal	Philippine Republic Presidential Unit Citation

=== Distinguished Service Cross citation (1st Award) ===

MacDonald, Charles H.
Colonel (Air Corps), U.S. Army Air Forces
457th Fighter Group, 5th Air Force
Date of Action: December 7, 1944

Citation:

The President of the United States of America, authorized by Act of Congress, July 9, 1918, takes pleasure in presenting the Distinguished Service Cross to Colonel (Air Corps) Charles Henry MacDonald, United States Army Air Forces, for extraordinary heroism in connection with military operations against an armed enemy while serving as Pilot of a P-38 Fighter Airplane in the 475th Fighter Group, Fifth Air Force, in action over Ormoc Bay, Leyte, Philippine Islands, on 7 December 1944. During the surprise landing of troops from an allied convoy at Ormoc Bay, Colonel MacDonald voluntarily led a two-plane flight of P-38's to join another flight covering the friendly shipping. On approaching the area he sighted three enemy fighters heading for our convoy, and with complete disregard for his own safety he promptly attacked the enemy flight leader. Pressing his attack close, he shot down one enemy fighter and assisted in the destruction of another. Returning to his home base for refueling, Colonel MacDonald again took off, this time leading a flight of four P-38's. While on patrol, a formation approximating seven enemy fighters jumped his flight from the rear, shooting down number three man. Though outnumbered more than two to one, Colonel MacDonald skillfully forced two of the enemy planes to break flight and in the ensuing dog-fight personally accounted for two more enemy planes, and set up another for his wing man who shot it down, thus again breaking up an enemy attack at a critical time and saving much valuable shipping. His initiative, aggressiveness and outstanding leadership in these actions enabled him to destroy three enemy aircraft and contribute to the destruction of two more, bringing his total victories to twenty-four. Colonel MacDonald's heroic action and example of leadership exemplify the highest traditions of the military service.

=== Distinguished Service Cross citation (2nd Award) ===

MacDonald, Charles H.
Colonel (Air Corps), U.S. Army Air Forces
457th Fighter Group, 5th Air Force
Date of Action: December 25, 1944

Citation:

The President of the United States of America, authorized by Act of Congress July 9, 1918, takes pleasure in presenting a Bronze Oak Leaf Cluster in lieu of a Second Award of the Distinguished Service Cross to Colonel (Air Corps) Charles Henry MacDonald (ASN: 0–22518), United States Army Air Forces, for extraordinary heroism in connection with military operations against an armed enemy while serving as Pilot of a P-38 Fighter Airplane in the 475th Fighter Group, Fifth Air Force, in aerial combat against enemy forces on 25 December 1944, in the Southwest Pacific Area of Operations. On that date, Colonel MacDonald shot down three enemy aircraft in a single engagement. It was the second time in less than three weeks that he shot down three aircraft in a single mission. Colonel MacDonald's unquestionable valor in aerial combat is in keeping with the highest traditions of the military service and reflects great credit upon himself, the 5th Air Force, and the United States Army Air Forces.

== See also ==
- Thomas B. McGuire
- List of World War II air aces
