= 431st Expeditionary Reconnaissance Squadron =

431st Test and Evaluation Squadron

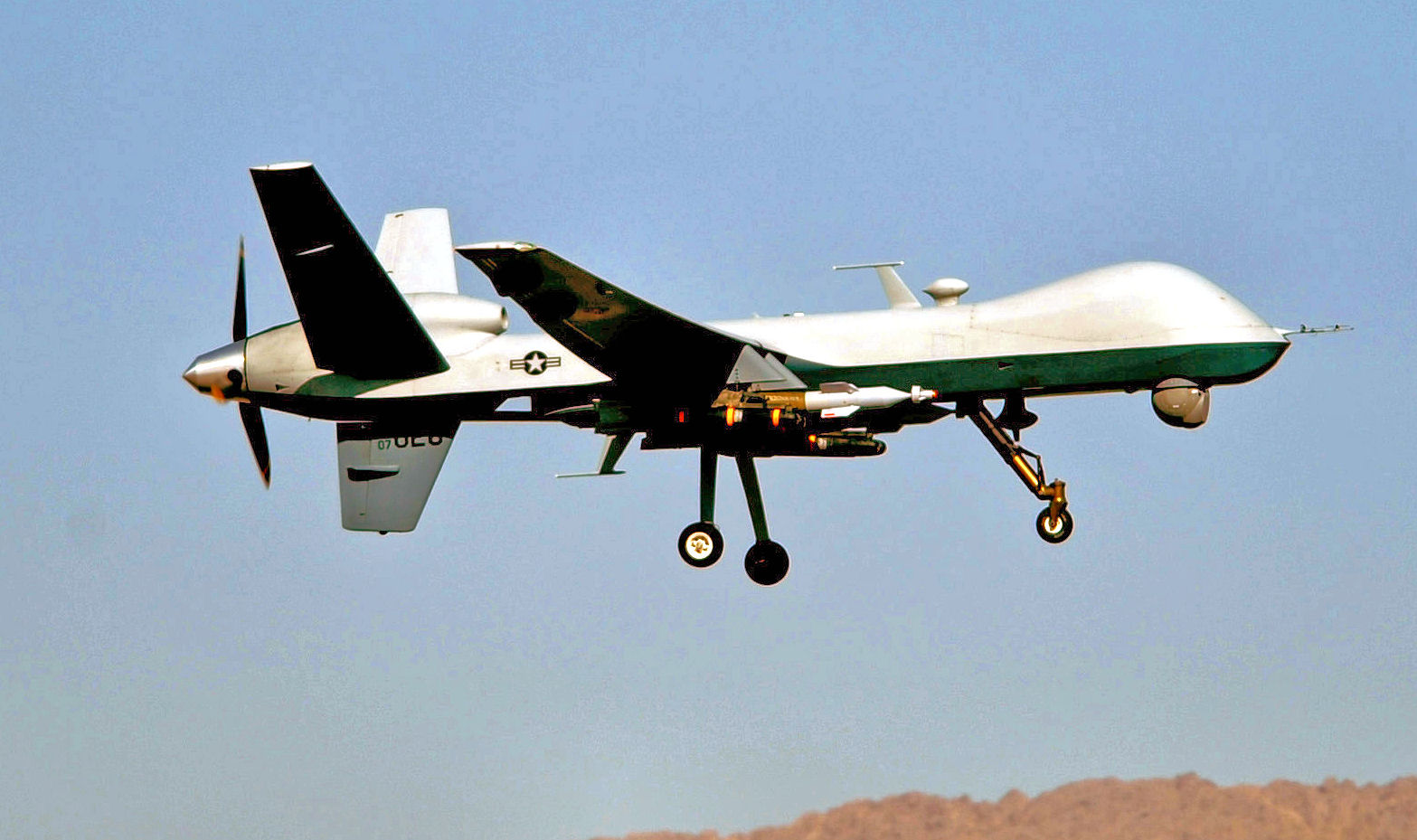
- An MQ-9 Reaper of an expeditionary reconnaissance squadron
- Active: 1943–1971; 1976– 1978; 1980–1992; 2025–present
- Country: United States
- Branch: United States Air Force
- Role: Reconnaissance
- Part of: Pacific Air Forces
- Garrison/HQ: Kunsan AB
- Nickname: Satan's Angels
- Engagements: Southwest Pacific Theater
- Decorations: Distinguished Unit Citation; Air Force Outstanding Unit Award; Philippine Presidential Unit Citation

Commanders
- Notable commanders: Major Thomas McGuire

Insignia
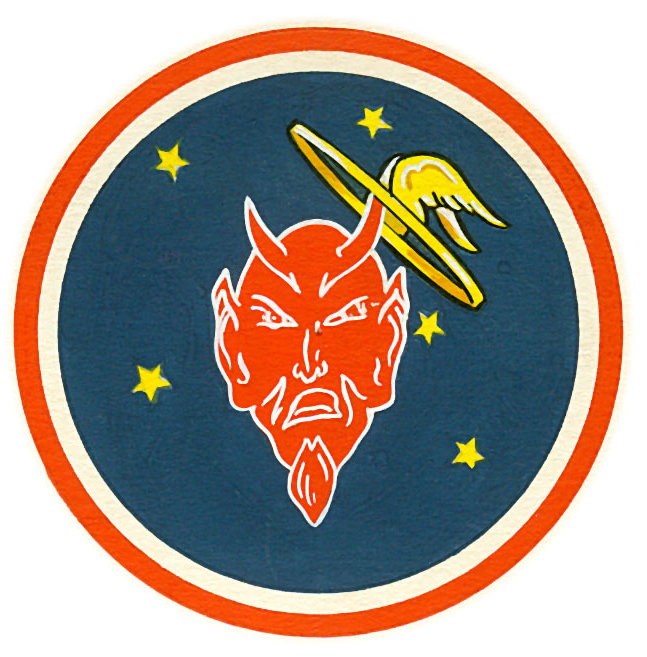
- 431st Expeditionary Reconnaissance Squadron emblem (Note: Approved 19 September 1944. Description: On a grayed dark blue disc, border equally divided red and white, Satan's head affronte, proper, beneath a yellow orange halo and between five yellow orange stars forming the Southern Cross.)

The 431st Expeditionary Reconnaissance Squadron is an active United States Air Force unit, stationed at Kunsan Air Base, Korea. It was originally formed during World War II to escort bombers as the 431st Fighter Squadron. It was inactivated in 1949, but reactivated as the 431st Fighter-Interceptor Squadron from 1952 to 1964, as the 431st Tactical Fighter Squadron from 1964 to 1970, as the 431st Tactical Fighter Training Squadron from 1976 to 1978, as the 431st Fighter Weapons Squadron from1980, as the 431st Test and Evaluation Squadron from 1981 to 1992, and as the 431st Expeditionary Reconnaissance Squadron in September 2025. The unit's current assignment involves unmanned MQ-9 Reaper drone aircraft.

== History ==
=== World War II ===
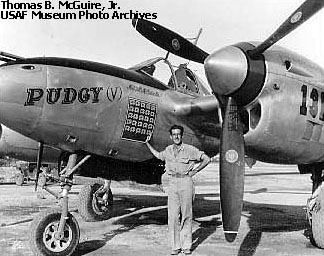
Major McGuire, commander of the 431st Fighter Squadron, next to his P-38L Pudgy (V) in 1944.

Established by Fifth Air Force in Australia in May 1943 specifically to accommodate very long range Lockheed P-38J Lightnings at Amberley Airfield in Queensland, Australia. The 431st was specifically trained to provide long-range escort for bombers during daylight raids on Japanese airfields and strongholds in the Netherlands East Indies and the Bismarck Archipelago. On 14 August 1943, the 431st transferred from Amberley Airfield to Port Moresby. New Guinea.

Engaged in combat operations, providing escort for North American B-25 Mitchell medium bombers that were engaged in strafing attacks on airdromes at Wewak but also destroyed a number of the enemy fighter planes that attacked the formation. Also intercepted and destroyed many Japanese aircraft which were sent against American shipping in Oro Bay on 15 and 17 October 1943. Covered landings in New Guinea, New Britain, and the Schouten Islands. After moving to Biak in July 1944, the squadron flew escort missions and fighter sweeps to the southern Philippines, Celebes, Halmahera, and Borneo.

Moved to the Philippines in October 1944 and attacked enemy airfields and installations, escorting bombers, and engaging in aerial combat during the first stages of the Allied campaign to recover the Philippines, October–December 1944. The squadron flew many missions to support ground forces on Luzon during the first part of 1945. Also flew escort missions to Southeast China and attacked railways on Formosa. Began moving to Ie Shima near Okinawa in August 1945 but the war ended before the movement was completed.

After active combat ended, on 22 September 1945, the squadron moved to Kimpo Airfield, on 7 January 1946 where it converted to the very long-range North American P-51H Mustang. The squadron was reassigned to Nagoya Airfield, Japan in March 1947 and later moved to Itazuke Airfield, Japan in August 1948. It became a subordinate unit of 475th Fighter Wing on 10 August.

The squadron was inactivated on 1 April 1949 at Ashiya Air Base, Japan.

=== Cold War ===
==== Air defense operations ====
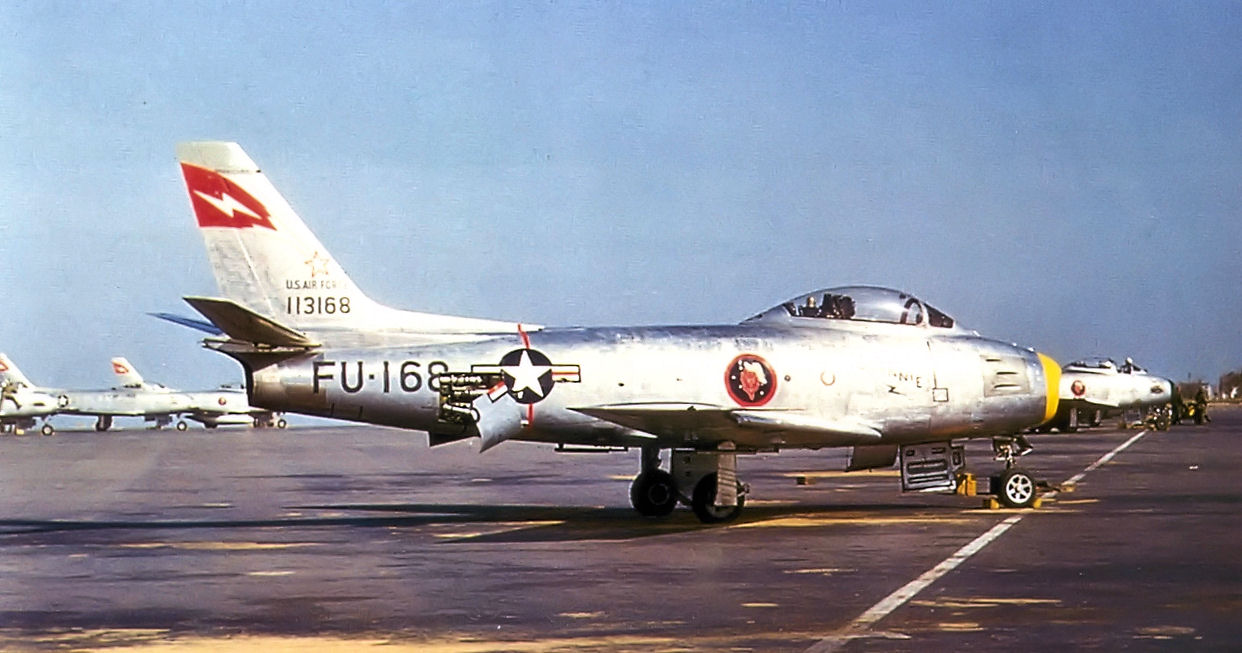
431st FIS F-86F 51-13168 at Selfridge AFB, 1953

Reactivated as part of Air Defense Command (ADC) in November 1952, replacing the federalized 172d Fighter-Interceptor Squadron of the Michigan Air National Guard. Stationed at Selfridge Air Force Base, Michigan with mission of air defense of the Detroit/Akron area and Great Lakes initially flying the North American F-86F Sabres reassigned from the 63d Fighter-Interceptor Squadron at Oscoda Air Force Base, Michigan.

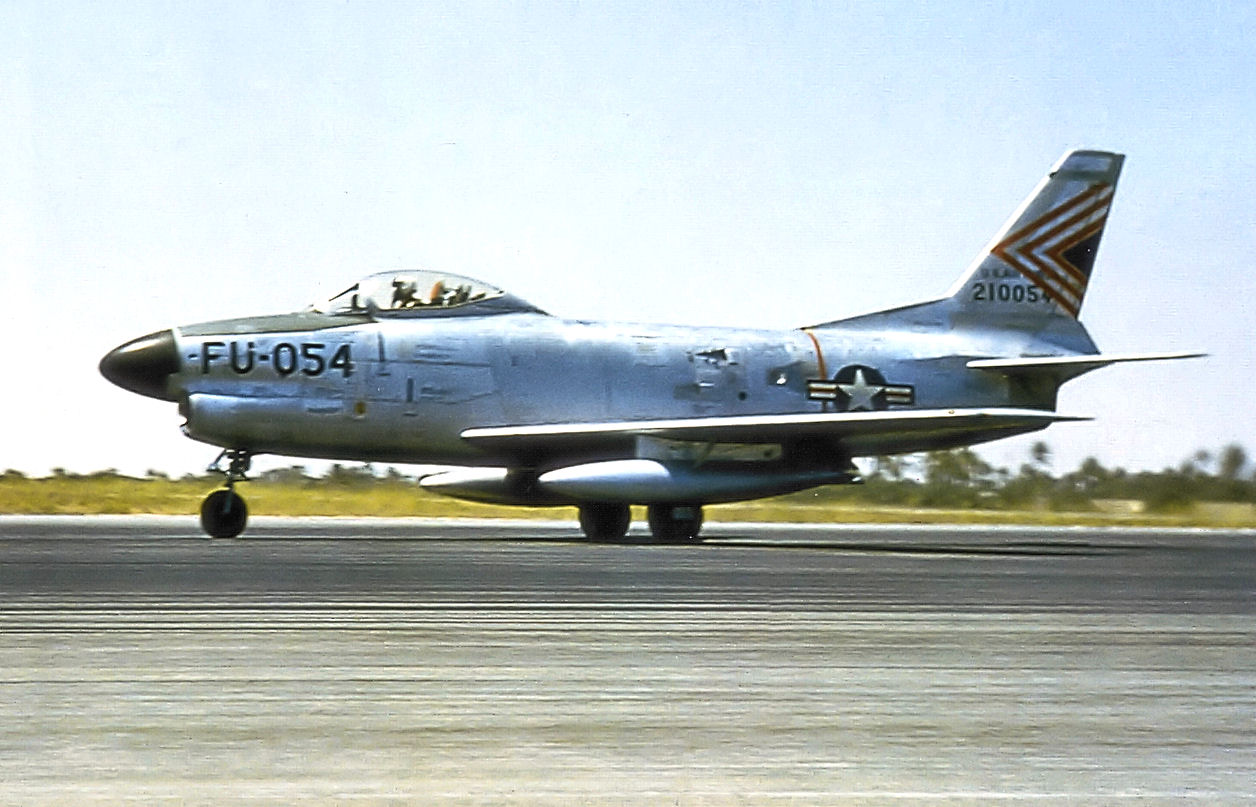
431st FIS F-86D Sabre 52-10054 at Zaragoza AB, 1958

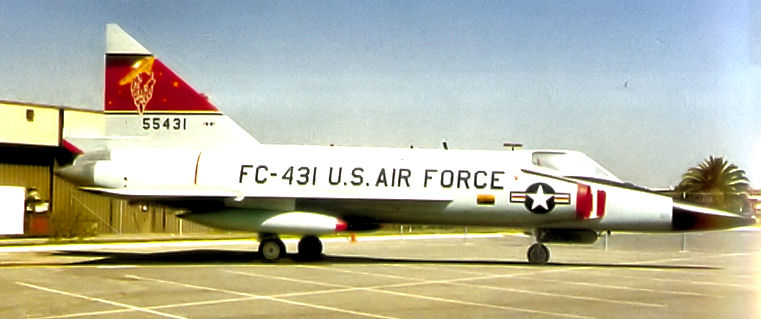
431st FIS F-102A Delta Dagger 55-3431

Relieved from duty with ADC and reassigned to United States Air Forces Europe under Seventeenth Air Force. Flying from Wheelus Air Base, Libya to provide air defense over the large North African base and expansive training ranges. Replaced its Korean War vintage F-86F's with new F-86D Sabre interceptors in January 1955. Moved to Zaragoza Air Base, Spain in September 1958 where new Convair F-102A Delta Dagger interceptors replaced the F-86D's. The unit was reassigned to the Strategic Air Command Sixteenth Air Force. Inactivated in 1964 with withdrawal of Boeing B-47 Stratojet from inventory and SAC turning jurisdiction of its Spanish refueling bases to USAFE.

==== Tactical fighter operations ====
Was reassigned to Tactical Air Command, being stationed at George Air Force Base, California, assigned to 8th Tactical Fighter Wing. Equipped with McDonnell F-4C Phantom II tactical fighter-bomber, engaged in training, participated in numerous exercises, operational readiness inspections, deployments. Re-equipped with new F-4D Phantom II in 1965 and reassigned to 479th Tactical Training Wing at George. The F-4D was an improved version of the F-4C, which the 8th Tactical Fighter Wing had been deployed with to Southeast Asia.

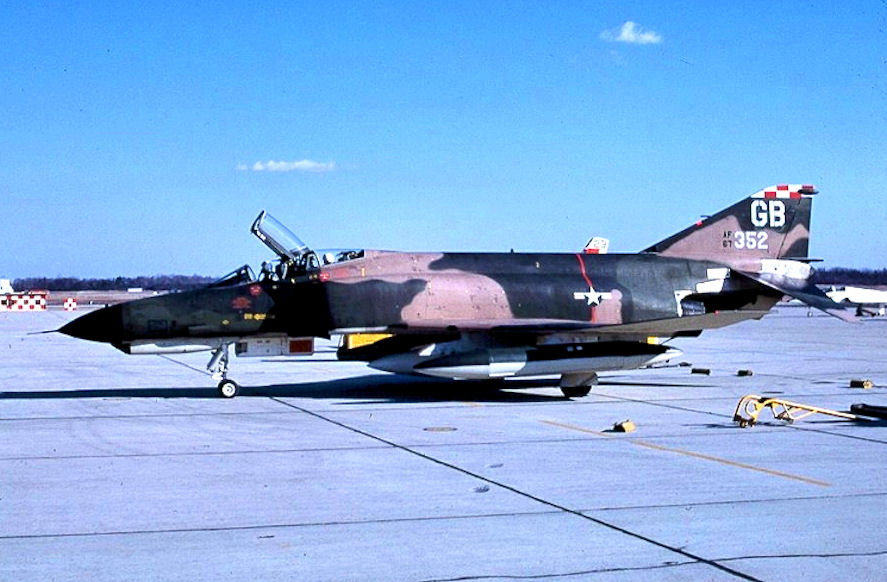
431st TFS F-4E 67-0352

In February 1966, the squadron began McDonnell F-4D Phantom II replacement pilot training for personnel to be deployed to Southeast Asia. Along with the USAF fighter pilot training, the squadron began training foreign personnel in F-4 operations and maintenance in March 1969. Pilots were trained from Israel, Iran, Japan, and West Germany. Inactivated on 30 October 1970 due to budget reductions.

Reactivated at George Air Force Base in 1975 as part of the 35th Tactical Fighter Wing. Engaged in F-4E "Wild Weasel" training as a tactical fighter training squadron against Republic F-105G Thunderchiefs. Inactivated due to budget cuts in 1978.

==== Fighter Weapons Squadron ====
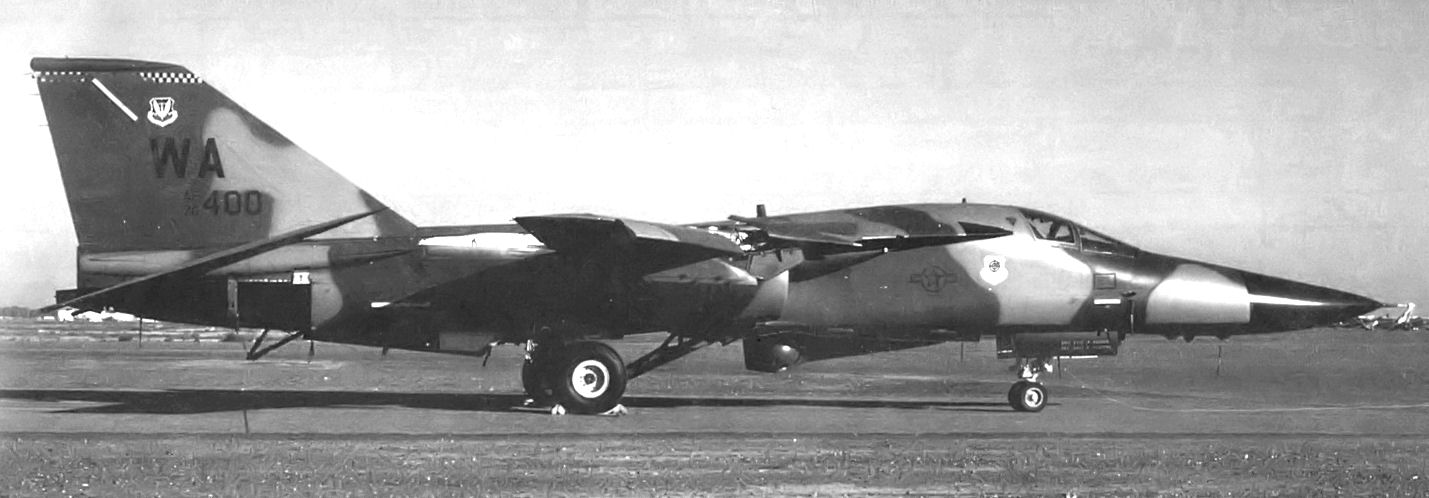
431st FWS F-111F 70-2400

Reactivated at McClellan Air Force Base, California in 1980 as a General Dynamics F-111 Aardvark evaluation squadron, assuming mission of Detachment 3, 57th Fighter Weapons Wing, being a geographically separated unit of the 57th Fighter Weapons Wing. McClellan was the Air Force Logistics Command prime support depot for the F-111 and changes and modifications could be made there and tested by the detachment.

The 431st's mission was to test and evaluate Time Compliance Technical Order modifications to the F-111A/D/E and F models prior to those changes being released to operational F-111 tactical wings in the United States and Europe. In addition was tasked with exploiting foreign technologies, and developing leading-edge tactics to improve the future combat capability of aerospace forces. Squadron remained active until June 1992 when the F-111 was retired at the end of the Cold War.

==== Unmanned Aerial Vehicle operations ====
The squadron was converted to provisional status and redesignated the 431st Expeditionary Reconnaissancee Squadron. It was activated at Kunsan Air Base, South Korea in September 2025.

== Lineage ==
- Activated on 14 May 1943 by special authority prior to constitution as 431st Fighter Squadron on 15 May 1943

Inactivated on 1 April 1949

- Redesignated 431st Fighter-Interceptor Squadron on 11 September 1952

Activated in November 1952
Inactivated on 18 May 1964

- Reactivated and redesignated as 431st Tactical Fighter Squadron, 25 July 1964

Inactivated on 30 October 1970

- Reactivated and redesignated as 431st Tactical Fighter Training Squadron, 15 January 1976

Inactivated on 1 October 1978.

- Reactivated and redesignated as 431st Fighter Weapons Squadron, 1 October 1980

Redesignated: 431st Test and Evaluation Squadron on 30 December 1981
Inactivated on 30 June 1992

- Redesignated 431st Expeditionary Reconnaissance Squadron

Activated c. 29 September 2025

=== Assignments ===
- 475th Fighter Group, 14 May 1943 – 1 April 1949 (attached to 347th Fighter Group, 15 November 1947 – 28 August 1948)
- 4708th Defense Wing, 1 November 1952
- 575th Air Defense Group, 16 February 1953
- Seventeenth Air Force, 10 July 1953
- 1603d Air Transport Wing later 7272d Air Base Wing), 20 July 1953
- 7272d Operations Group, 1 March 1958
- 65th Air Division, 1 September 1958
- United States Air Forces in Europe (attached to 86th Air Division) 1 July 1960 – 18 May 1964
- 8th Tactical Fighter Wing, 25 July 1964 (attached to 479th Tactical Fighter Wing after 6 December 1965)
- 479th Tactical Fighter Wing, 15 June 1968 – 30 October 1970
- 35th Tactical Fighter Wing, 15 January 1976 – 1 October 1978
- 57th Fighter Weapons Wing, 1 October 1980 – 30 June 1992
- Pacific Air Forces

Attached to 8th Fighter Wing, c. 29 September 2025 – present

=== Stations ===
- Charters Towers, Australia, 14 May 1943
- RAAF Base Amberley Field, Australia, c. 1 July 1943
- Dobodura Airfield Complex, New Guinea, 14 August 1943

Operated from Port Moresby Airfield Complex, New Guinea, 8 August – 3 October 1943

- Nadzab Airfield Complex, New Guinea, 26 March 1944
- Hollandia Airfield Complex, New Guinea, 15 May 1944
- Mokmer Airfield, Biak, Netherlands East Indies, 15 July 1944
- Dulag Airfield, Leyte, Philippines, 9 November 1944

Detachment operated from San Jose, Mindoro, Philippines, 5 February – c. 4 March 1945

- Clark Field, Luzon, Philippines, 28 February 1945
- Lingayen Airfield, Luzon, Philippines, 19 April 1945
- Ie Shima Airfield, 8 August 1945
- Kimpo Air Base, Korea, 5 October 1945
- Tachikawa Air Base, Japan, c. 20 February 1947
- Itazuke Airfield (later Itazuke Air Force Base), Japan, 15 November 1947
- Ashiya Air Base, Japan, 25 March – 1 April 1949
- Selfridge Air Force Base, Michigan, 1 November 1952 – 23 June 1953
- Wheelus Air Base, Libya, 20 July 1953 – 3 September 1958
- Zaragoza Air Base, Spain, 3 September 1958 – 18 May 1964
- George Air Force Base, California, 18 May 1964 – 30 October 1970; 15 January 1976 – 1 October 1978
- McClellan Air Force Base, California, 1 October 1980 – 30 June 1992
- Kunsan Air Base, Korea, c. 29 September 2025 – present

=== Aircraft ===
- Lockheed P-38 Lightning] 1943–1946
- North American P-51 Mustang, 1946–1949; F-51, 1952–1953
- North American F-86D Sabre, 1953–1960
- Convair F-102 Delta Dagger, 1960–1964
- McDonnell F-4 Phantom II, 1964–1970; 1976–1978
- General Dynamics F-111 Aardvark, 1980–1992
- General Atomics MQ-9, 2025 – present
