= 83d Fighter-Day Group =

83d Fighter-Day Group (later 83d Tactical Fighter Group)
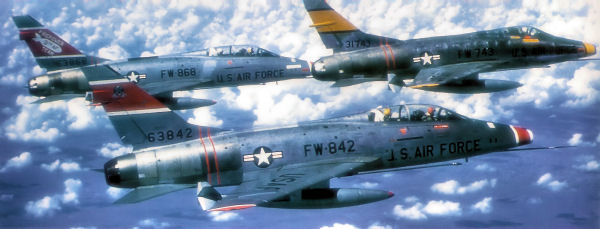
- F-100 Super Sabres from Seymour Johnson AFB in the 1950s (Note: Lead aircraft is a North American F-100C-1-NA Super Sabre, serial 53-174. Wingmen are flying North American F-100F-NA Super Sabres, serials 56-3842 and 56-3868.)
- Active: 1943–1944; 1956–1967
- Country: United States
- Branch: United States Air Force
- Role: Fighter

Commanders
- Notable commanders: Colonel John S. Loisel

Insignia
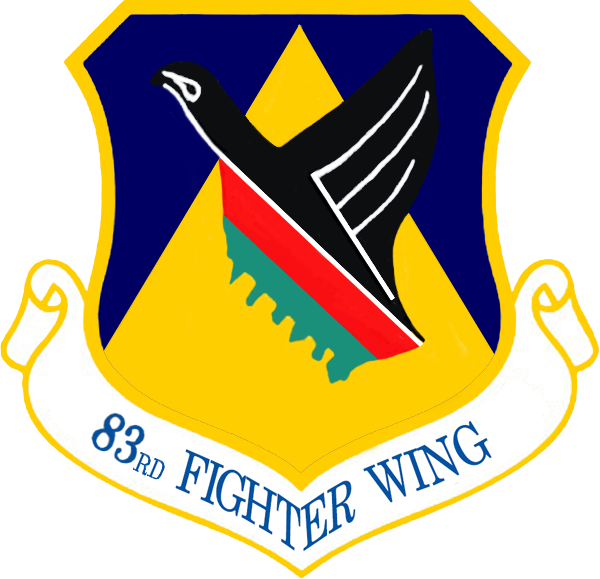
- 83d Fighter-Day Group emblem (Note: Approved 25 March 1957 for the 83d Fighter-Day Wing. The 83d Group uses the wing emblem with the group designation on the scroll. Air Force Instruction 84-105, Organizational Lineage, Honors and Heraldry, 19 March 2013, para 3.3.3.)

The 83d Fighter-Day Group is an inactive United States Air Force unit. It was first activated in September 1943 as the 83d Fighter Group. The group acted a Replacement Training Unit until April 1944, when it was disbanded as the Army Air Forces reorganized its training units in the United States. It was again activated in 1956, as Tactical Air Command reopened Seymour Johnson Air Force Base, North Carolina as a fighter base. It was inactivated on 8 December 1957, when the 83d Wing converted from the wing base organization to the dual deputy organization.

== History ==
=== World War II ===
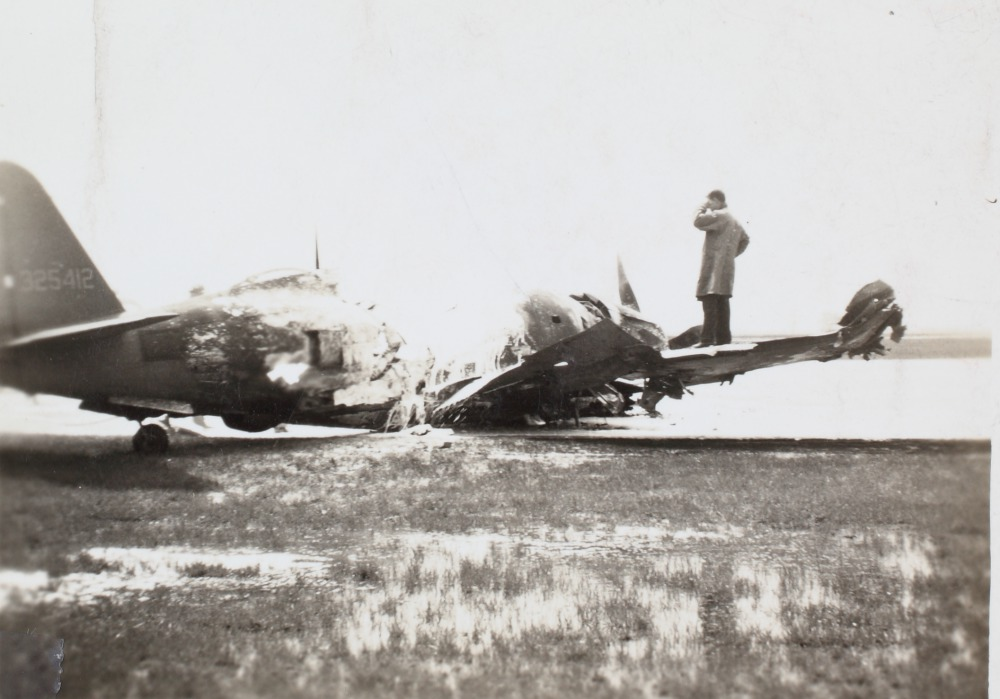
P-47 crashed on the runway at Dover AAF (Note: Aircraft is Republic P-47D Thunderbolt P-47D-20-RA, serial 43-25412, taken in 1944.)

The group was first activated at Richmond Army Air Base, Virginia on 25 September 1943 as the 83d Fighter Group, with the 532d, 533d and 534th Fighter Squadrons assigned as its original components. The group was initially assigned to the Philadelphia Fighter Wing, but it was shortly thereafter decided that the unit would become a Replacement Training Unit (RTU). On 20 November, the 448th Fighter Squadron was assigned as a fourth squadron. Although the squadron was activated at Richmond, it moved to Dover Army Air Field, Delaware the same day. Two days later, group headquarters and the three other squadrons joined it at Dover.

At Dover, the group was an RTU for Republic P-47 Thunderbolt pilots. RTUs were oversized units to train individual pilots or aircrews. However, the Army Air Forces (AAF) found that standard military units, based on relatively inflexible tables of organization were proving not well adapted to the training mission. Accordingly, the AAF adopted a more functional system in which each base was organized into a separate numbered unit. Therefore, the 83d Group, along with its components and supporting units at Dover were disbanded on 10 April 1944 and replaced by the 125th AAF Base Unit (Fighter).

=== Tactical Air Command ===
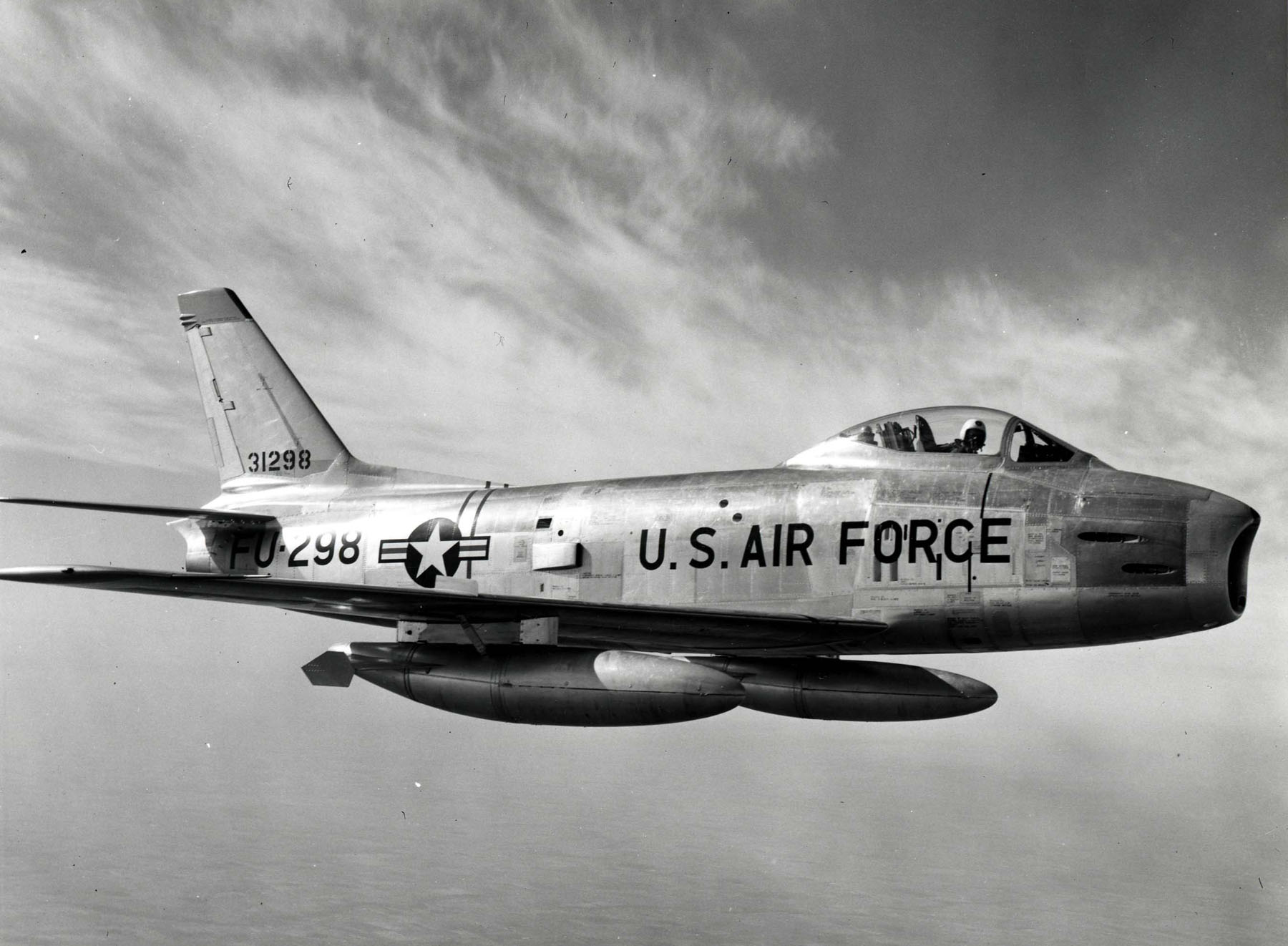
F-86H Sabre in flight (Note: Aircraft is North American F-86H-10-NH Sabre, serial 53-1298.)

The group was reconstituted and redesignated the 83d Fighter-Day Group. It was activated as part of the 83d Fighter-Day Wing in July 1956, as Tactical Air Command (TAC) began to expand its operations at Seymour Johnson Air Force Base, North Carolina, which had reopened in April 1956. The group was assigned its three original squadrons, but initially operated a variety of aircraft, including transports and trainers to maintain pilot proficiency. Its only fighter aircraft were Lockheed F-80 Shooting Stars, until it began to receive North American F-86H Sabres in October 1956.

The group became combat ready with its F-86s by June 1957 and participated in firepower demonstrations with its Sabres. In late 1957, the group began converting to the North American F-100 Super Sabre, but TAC reorganized the 83d Wing under the dual deputy organization. The group became non-operational on 7 November 1957, a few days before inactivating on 11 November, when its three operational squadrons were transferred directly to the 83d Wing.

The group was redesignated the 83d Tactical Fighter Group on 31 July 1985, but remained inactive.

== Lineage ==
- Constituted as the 83d Fighter Group on 18 September 1943 (Note: Despite the similar name, the group is not related to the 83d Pursuit Group (Interceptor), which was constituted on 13 January 1942 and activated at New Orleans Army Air Base as part of Third Air Force on 9 February 1942, but disbanded on 15 February 1942. Maurer,Combat Units, p. 149.)

Activated on 25 September 1943
Disbanded on 10 April 1944

- Reconstituted and redesignated the 83d Fighter-Day Group on 24 February 1956

Activated on 8 July 1956
Inactivated on 11 November 1957
Redesignated 83d Tactical Fighter Group on 31 July 1985

=== Assignments ===
- Philadelphia Fighter Wing, 25 September 1943
- I Fighter Command, c. 22 November 1943 – 10 April 1944
- 83d Fighter-Day Wing, 8 July 1956 – 11 November 1957

=== Components ===
- 448th Fighter Squadron: 20 November 1943 – 10 April 1944
- 532d Fighter Squadron (later 532d Fighter-Day Squadron): 25 September 1943 – 10 April 1944; 8 July 1956 – 11 November 1957 (Attached to 83d Fighter-Day Wing after 7 November 1957)
- 533d Fighter Squadron (later 533d Fighter-Day Squadron): 25 September 1943 – 10 April 1944; 8 July 1956 – 11 November 1957 (Attached to 83d Fighter-Day Wing after 7 November 1957)
- 534th Fighter Squadron (later 534th Fighter-Day Squadron): 25 September 1943 – 10 April 1944; 8 July 1956 – 11 November 1957 (Attached to 83d Fighter-Day Wing after 7 November 1957)

=== Stations ===
- Richmond Army Air Base, Virginia, 25 September 1943
- Dover Army Air Field, Delaware, 22 November 1943 – 10 April 1944
- Seymour Johnson Air Force Base, North Carolina, 8 July 1956 – 8 December 1957

=== Aircraft ===
- Republic P-47 Thunderbolt, 1943–1944
- Beechcraft C-45 Expeditor, 1956
- Douglas C-47 Skytrain, 1956
- Fairchild C-119 Flying Boxcar, 1956
- Lockheed T-33 T-Bird, 1956
- Lockheed F-80 Shooting Star, 1956
- North American F-86H Sabre, 1956-1957
- North American F-100 Super Sabre, 1957
