= Thomas McGuire =

American airman (1920–1945)

Thomas Buchanan McGuire
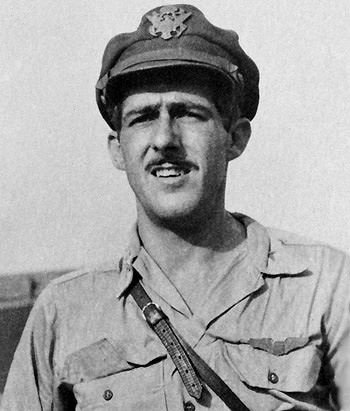
- Born: August 1, 1920; Ridgewood, New Jersey, U.S.
- Died: January 7, 1945 (aged 24); Negros, Visayas, Philippine Islands
- Burial place: Arlington National Cemetery
- Spouse: Marilynn "Pudgy" Giesler
- Military career
- Allegiance: United States
- Branch: United States Army Air Forces
- Service years: 1941–1945
- Rank: Major
- Units: 475th Fighter Group, Fifth Air Force
- Conflicts: World War II: South West Pacific Theatre; Battle of Buna-Gona; Philippines campaign †
- Awards: Medal of Honor; Distinguished Service Cross; Silver Star (3); Distinguished Flying Cross (6); Purple Heart (3); Air Medal (15)

Thomas Buchanan McGuire Jr. (August 1, 1920 – January 7, 1945) was an American United States Army major who was killed in action while serving as a member of the United States Army Air Forces during World War II and posthumously awarded the Medal of Honor. He was one of the most decorated American fighter pilots and the second-highest scoring American ace of the war.

McGuire was memorialized by the renaming of Fort Dix Army Air Force Base in Burlington County, New Jersey, to McGuire Air Force Base in 1948.

== Early years ==
McGuire was born in Ridgewood, New Jersey, on August 1, 1920. He and his mother moved to Sebring, Florida in the late 1920s and McGuire graduated from Sebring High School in 1938. He enrolled at the Georgia Institute of Technology to study aeronautical engineering, where he played in the marching band, was a sergeant major in the ROTC cadet corps, and became a member of Beta Theta Pi fraternity. He left after his third year to enter the U.S. Army Air Corps Aviation Cadet Program on July 12, 1941.

== United States Army Air Forces ==
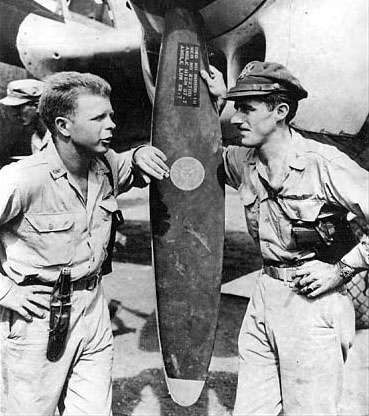
The top two American aces of World War II: Majors Richard Bong (left) and "Tommy" McGuire (right) in November 1944

McGuire would become one of the top scoring combat pilots in U.S. Air Force history. Civilian contractor Charles Lindbergh bunked with him for a time and flew as his wingman on several missions. Visitors recalled McGuire ordering Lindbergh around, telling him to run errands as though he were a servant. With a total of 38 enemy planes destroyed to his credit in World War II, McGuire was only two victories behind Major Richard Bong.

=== World War II ===
McGuire reported to the flying school in Corsicana, Texas, as an aviation cadet. He received further training in San Antonio, and was commissioned a second lieutenant and awarded his pilot wings at Kelly Field, Texas, on February 2, 1942. He was assigned to the 313th Pursuit Squadron at Selfridge Field, Michigan from February to May and the 56th Pursuit Squadron at Paine Field, Texas.

==== Combat missions ====
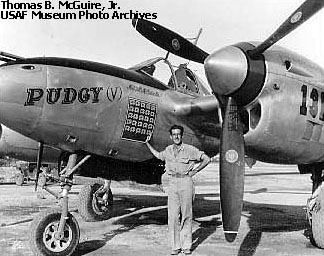
Major McGuire, commander of the 431st Fighter Squadron, next to his P-38L Pudgy (V) in 1944

McGuire's first combat assignment was in June 1942, flying patrols over the Aleutian Islands in a Bell P-39 Airacobra while assigned to the 54th Fighter Group until October, before returning to Harding Field, Louisiana. While scoring no aerial victories in the Aleutians, McGuire was able to hone his skills as a pilot. In December 1942, he married Marilynn "Pudgy" Giesler shortly before he was transferred to Hamilton Field, California. In February 1943, he reported to Orange County Airport, California for transition training in the Lockheed P-38 Lightning.

In March 1943, McGuire was sent to the Southwest Pacific as a member of the 9th Fighter Squadron, 49th Fighter Group, Fifth Air Force, based in New Guinea. Two months later, the Fifth Air Force created an entire group of P-38s, the 475th Fighter Group in Australia at the behest of Lieutenant General George Kenney, the commanding officer of the Fifth Air Force. In mid-July, McGuire was transferred to the 431st Fighter Squadron, 475th Fighter Group. On August 18, 1943, Lieutenant McGuire was part of a group flying top cover for bombers striking at Wewak, New Guinea. Nearing their target, the fighters were attacked by Japanese aircraft. During the battle, McGuire shot down two Nakajima Ki-43 "Oscars" and one Kawasaki Ki-61 "Tony." On the following day, near the same location, he downed two more Oscars. This established him as an ace in two days. In September, he was promoted to first lieutenant.

McGuire's career nearly came to an end on October 17, 1943, when he scrambled from Dubodura, New Guinea to intercept approaching Japanese bombers being escorted by Mitsubishi A6M Zero fighters over Oro Bay, New Guinea. During the ensuing dogfight, McGuire observed at least seven Zeros attacking a lone P-38 that was trailing smoke. McGuire dove into the enemy fighters and quickly shot down three. The remaining four Zeros were able to attack McGuire and severely damage his aircraft. With his controls out, McGuire decided to bail out but as he exited the aircraft, his parachute harness snagged on something in the cockpit. From 12,000 to 5,000 feet (3,658 to 1,524 m) McGuire struggled to free himself from the stricken fighter. Finally McGuire was able to free himself and deploy his parachute at 1,000 feet (300 m). He landed safely in the water and was rescued by a PT boat. McGuire suffered a 7.7 millimetres (0.30 in) bullet wound to his wrist and numerous other injuries including some broken ribs. He spent six weeks in the hospital before he returned to his unit. For his actions on this day he was awarded a Silver Star and a Purple Heart. In late December, he was promoted to captain and became the operation officer of the 431st Fighter Squadron.

In early May 1944, McGuire became the commanding officer of the 431st Fighter Squadron. McGuire wrote a book, Combat Tactics In The Southwest Pacific Area, for Fifth Air Force on 4 May 1944. On May 18, he was promoted to major. In December, McGuire became the Operation Officer of the 475th Fighter Group. On December 25–26, 1944, he downed seven Japanese fighter aircraft in just two days over Luzon, Philippines.

==== Last mission and death ====
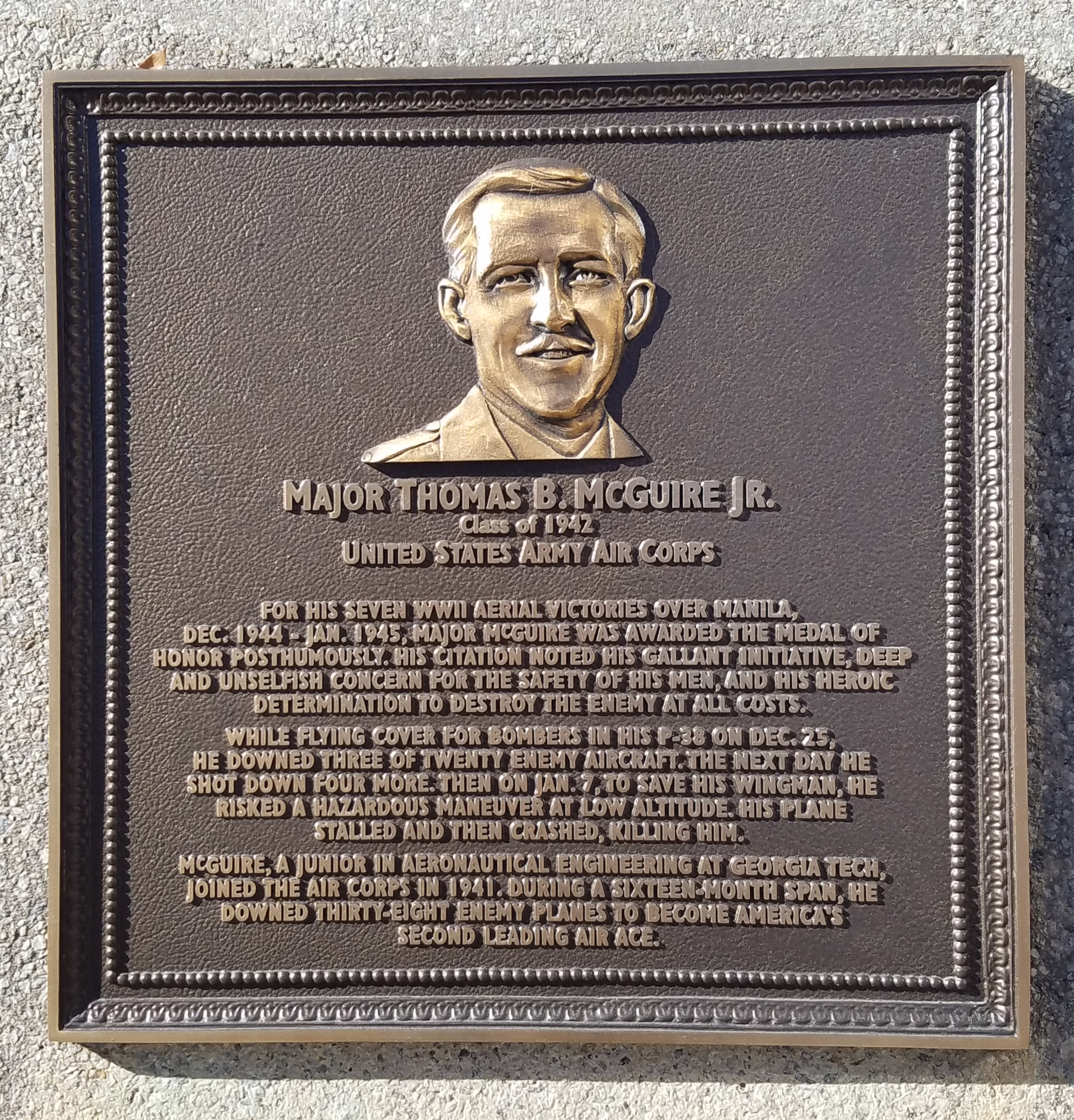
Plaque honoring McGuire at the Georgia Institute of Technology

January 7, 1945, McGuire took off from Dulag Airfield on Leyte and led a group of four P-38s – himself, Major Jack Rittmayer (who was visiting the area from the Thirteenth Air Force), Captain Edwin Weaver, and Lieutenant Douglas Thropp – on a fighter sweep over northern Negros Island in the central Philippines. Their aim was to gain victories. McGuire desperately wanted to pass Bong's score of 40 kills. Descending through cloud cover, McGuire's flight circled a Japanese airfield at Fabrica and then proceeded to a second airstrip at Manapla (also referred to as Carolina). As they approached Manapla, they were confronted by a lone Ki-43 "Oscar", which immediately engaged McGuire's flight.

Flying in the number-three position, Lt. Thropp saw the Oscar trying to attack him in a head-on pass. Thropp broke hard left. The Japanese pilot turned with him and fell into position behind him while firing. Major Rittmayer, flying as Thropp's wingman, turned sharply towards and began firing on the attacker. McGuire saw the Oscar was being engaged by Rittmayer and turned to face an imminent threat to the flight from the opposite direction. McGuire and his flight had encountered Warrant Officer Akira Sugimoto (杉本明, Sugimoto Akira), who was an instructor pilot with some 3,000+ hours in type. Sugimoto broke away from Thropp and Rittmayer and turned to find McGuire and his wingman Ed Weaver directly in front of him. Sugimoto was easily able to catch up and attack them from behind.

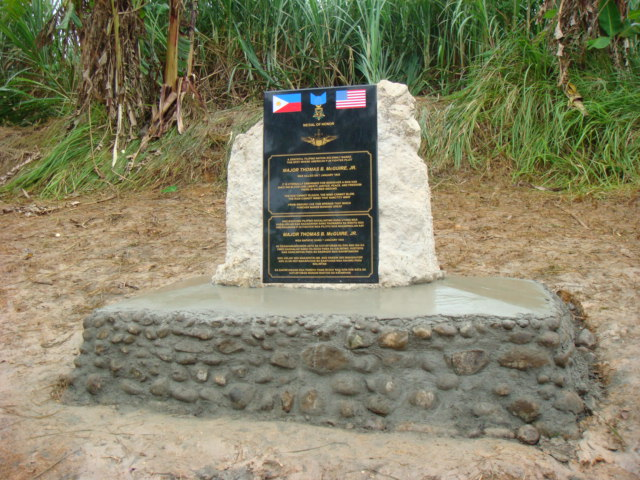
Major McGuire Memorial on Negros Island, Republic of the Philippines

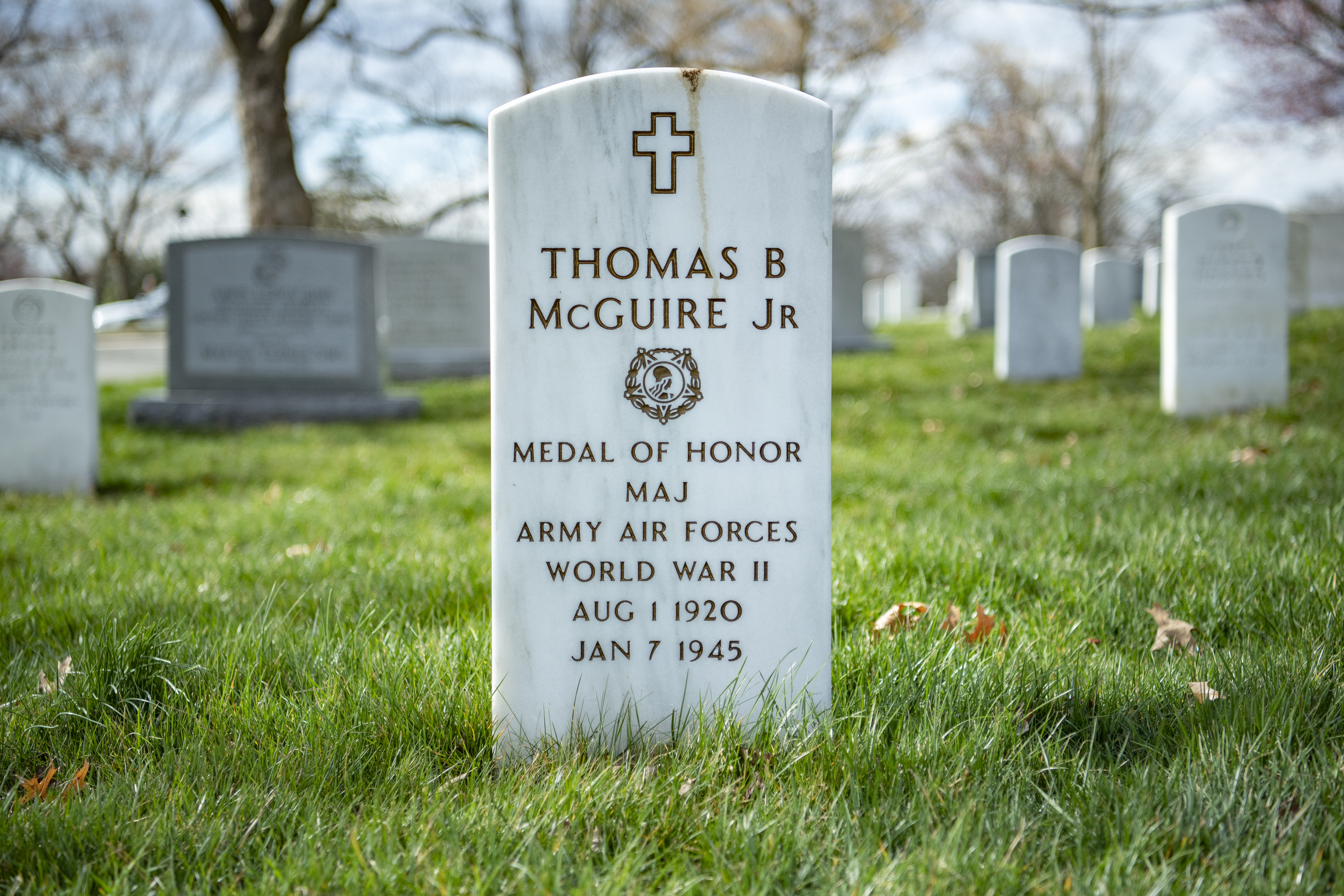
Grave at Arlington National Cemetery

As Sugimoto approached Weaver from behind, Weaver radioed he was attacked and cut inside of the turn to present a more difficult shot. McGuire eased up on his turn rate in an effort to draw the attacker off of his wingman and onto himself. Sugimoto took the bait and switched his attack to McGuire. As Sugimoto approached from behind, McGuire rapidly increased his turn rate. This extremely dangerous maneuver, performed at an altitude of only 300 ft (90 m) (contrary to McGuire's own dictates never to engage at a low altitude), caused McGuire's P-38 to stall. It snap rolled inverted and nosed down into the ground. Despite the low altitude, McGuire nearly pulled out successfully; had he jettisoned his drop tanks at the start of the dogfight, he might have managed it. McGuire was killed on impact. Sugimoto was soon hit by gunfire from Rittmayer and forced to crash-land in the jungle where he was killed by Filipino guerrillas. Minutes later a Ki-84 "Frank" flown by Technical Sergeant Mizunori Fukuda avenged the loss of Sugimoto by attacking Rittmayer in a head-on attack. Rittmayer's cockpit was riddled with bullets and his plane was shot down, killing him. Fukuda's plane was soon heavily damaged by the two other remaining American planes but he successfully hard-landed back at his airbase. He survived the war.

McGuire's crash was witnessed by Filipinos who immediately rushed to the scene and secured his body so it would not be captured. In 1949, his remains were recovered by the U.S. Army and returned to the United States. He was buried with full military honors at Arlington National Cemetery on May 17, 1950. A memorial was erected at McGuire's fatal crash site on Negros Island in 2007, placed by aviation archaeologist and former fighter pilot David Mason. McGuire was posthumously awarded the Medal of Honor due to sacrificing himself with his dangerous turn that ended up saving his wingman's life.

== Military awards ==
McGuire's military decorations and awards include:

United States Army Air Forces pilot badge
Medal of Honor	Distinguished Service Cross	Silver Star w/ two Bronze Oak Leaf Clusters
Distinguished Flying Cross w/ one Silver Oak Leaf Cluster	Purple Heart w/ two Bronze Oak Leaf Clusters	Air Medal w/ two Silver Oak Leaf Clusters and two Bronze Oak Leaf Clusters
Air Medal w/ one Bronze Oak Leaf Cluster	American Defense Service Medal	American Campaign Medal
Asiatic-Pacific Campaign Medal w/ one 3/16" silver star and two 3/16" bronze stars	World War II Victory Medal	Philippine Liberation Medal w/ two 3/16" bronze stars

Army Presidential Unit Citation w/ three bronze oak leaf clusters	Philippine Presidential Unit Citation

=== Medal of Honor citation ===
Rank and organization: Major, U.S. Army Air Forces, Fifth Air Force
Place and date: Over Luzon, Philippine Islands, December 25–26, 1944
Entered service at: Sebring, Florida
Birth: Ridgewood, New Jersey
G.O. No.: 24, March 7, 1946

He fought with conspicuous gallantry and intrepidity over Luzon, Philippine Islands. Voluntarily, he led a squadron of 15 P-38's as top cover for heavy bombers striking Mabalacat Airdrome, where his formation was attacked by 20 aggressive Japanese fighters. In the ensuing action he repeatedly flew to the aid of embattled comrades, driving off enemy assaults while himself under attack and at times outnumbered 3 to 1, and even after his guns jammed, continuing the fight by forcing a hostile plane into his wingman's line of fire. Before he started back to his base he had shot down 3 Zeros. The next day he again volunteered to lead escort fighters on a mission to strongly defended Clark Field. During the resultant engagement he again exposed himself to attacks so that he might rescue a crippled bomber. In rapid succession he shot down 1 aircraft, parried the attack of 4 enemy fighters, 1 of which he shot down, single-handedly engaged 3 more Japanese, destroying 1, and then shot down still another, his 38th victory in aerial combat. On 7 January 1945, while leading a voluntary fighter sweep over Los Negros Island, he risked an extremely hazardous maneuver at low altitude in an attempt to save a fellow flyer from attack, crashed, and was reported missing in action. With gallant initiative, deep and unselfish concern for the safety of others, and heroic determination to destroy the enemy at all costs, Maj. McGuire set an inspiring example in keeping with the highest traditions of the military service.

== Namings and other honors ==
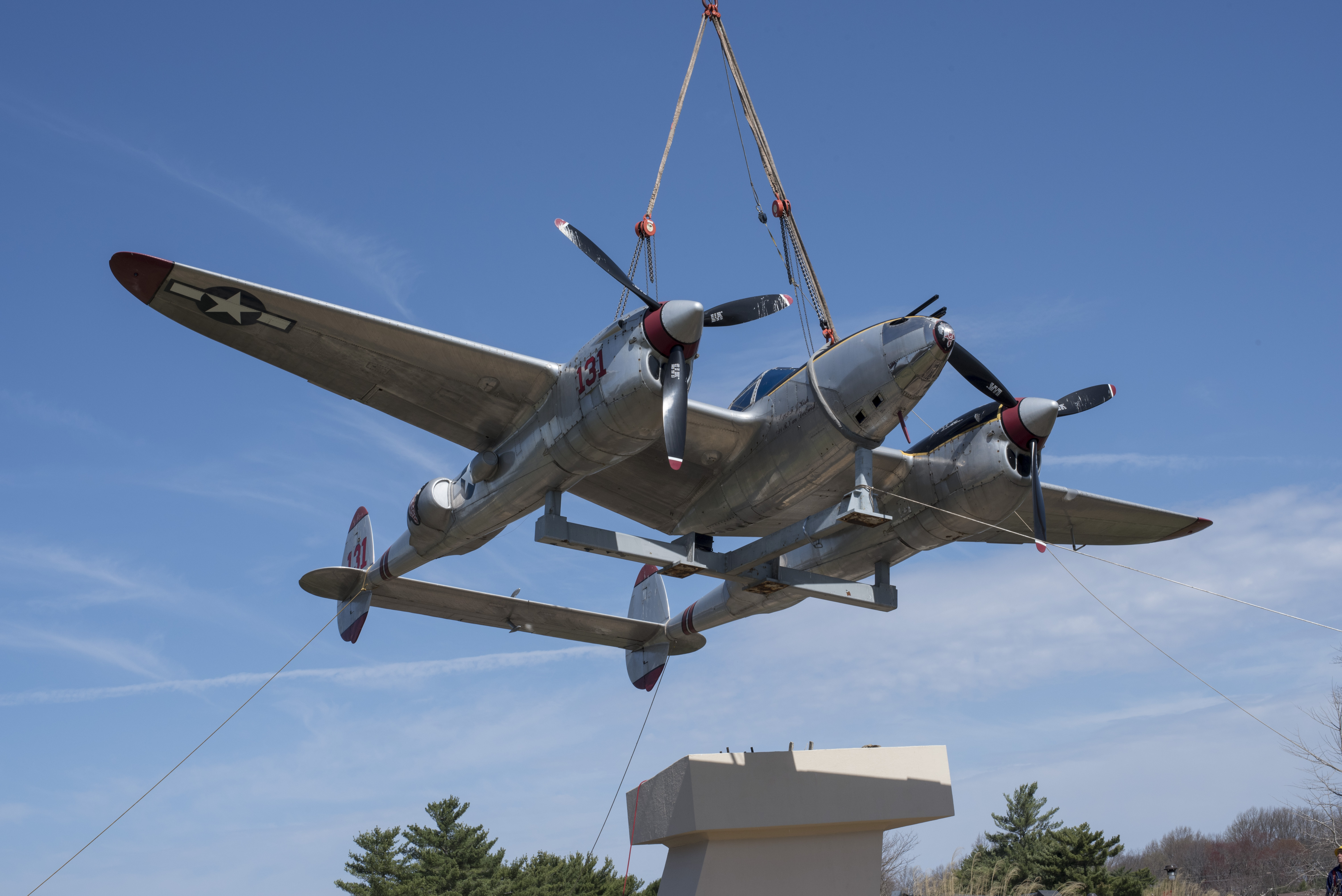
P-38 Lightning Pudgy static display at Joint Base McGuire–Dix–Lakehurst

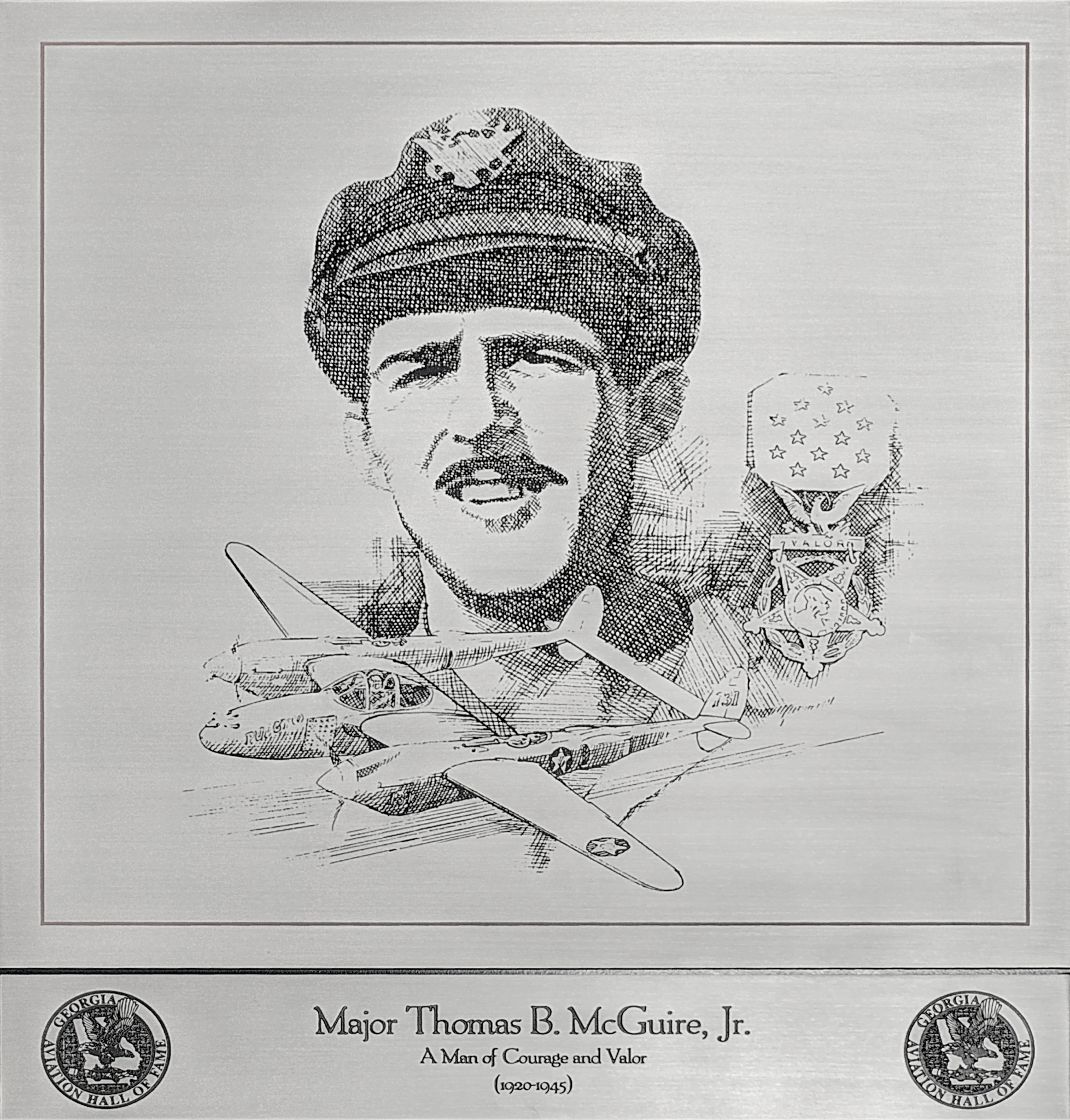
Plaque honoring McGuire at the Georgia Aviation Hall of Fame

- McGuire Air Force Base, New Jersey, January 1948. The base has a P-38 Lightning on static display and the C-17 and KC-10 aircraft flown by the 305 AMW and 514 AMW carry the image of a P-38 in the fin flash of each aircraft's vertical stabilizer
- San Jose Airport in San Jose, Occidental Mindoro, Philippines, formerly McGuire Field until 1951
- Major Thomas B. McGuire Medal of Honor Exhibit: National Museum of the United States Air Force, Wright-Patterson AFB, Ohio.
- National Aviation Hall of Fame, Dayton, Ohio
- Aviation Hall of Fame of New Jersey (Teterboro Airport)
- Georgia Aviation Hall of Fame
- National Medal of Honor Grove, Valley Forge, Pennsylvania
- Florida Medal of Honor Grove
- Georgia Tech Alumni Medal of Honor Garden
- United States and Canadian Military Service display of the Beta Museum at the Beta Theta Pi General Fraternity headquarters in Oxford, Ohio

== See also ==
- List of Medal of Honor recipients for World War II

== Bibliography ==
- Berg, A. Scott. Lindbergh. New York: G.P. Putnam's Sons, 1998. ISBN 0-399-14449-8.
- Martin, Charles A. The Last Great Ace: The Life of Major Thomas B. McGuire Jr. Jacksonville, Florida: Fruit Cove Publishing, 1999. ISBN 0-9667791-0-X.
