= 9th Attack Squadron =

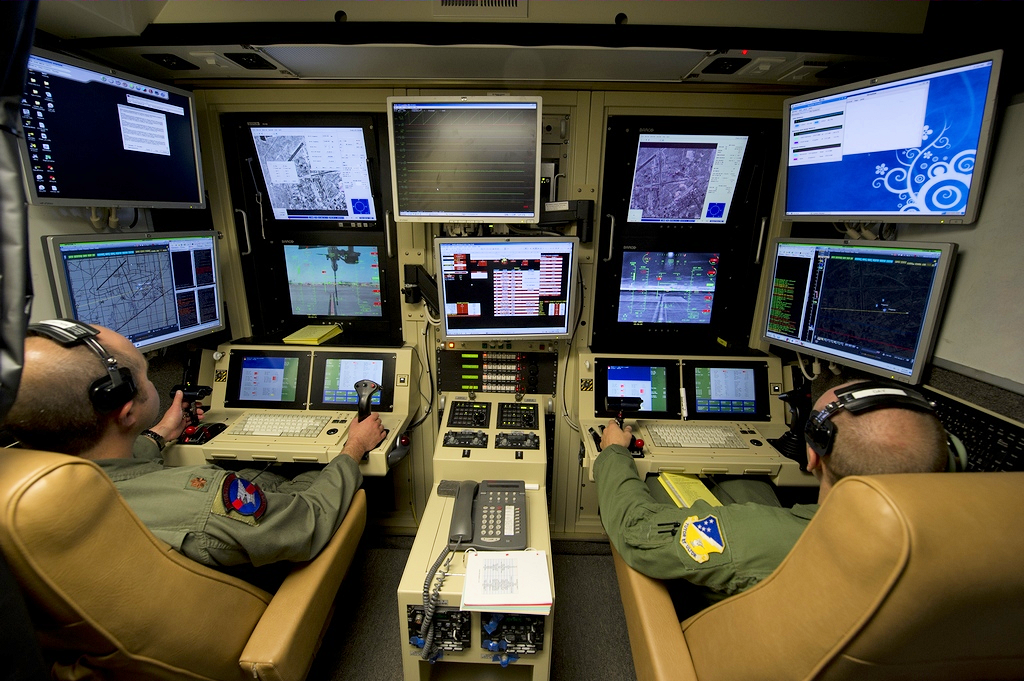
- 9th Attack Squadron – Ground Control Station
- Active: 1941–present
- Country: United States
- Branch: United States Air Force
- Type: Squadron
- Role: MQ-9 Reaper Remotely Piloted Aircraft training
- Part of: Air Education & Training Command
- Garrison/HQ: Holloman Air Force Base
- Nickname: Flying Knights
- Engagements: Southwest Pacific Theater; Korean War; Vietnam War; Desert Storm; Kosovo War
- Decorations: Distinguished Unit Citation; Air Force Outstanding Unit Award with Combat "V" Device; Air Force Outstanding Unit Award; Philippine Presidential Unit Citation; Republic of Korea Presidential Unit Citation; Republic of Vietnam Gallantry Cross with Palm

Insignia
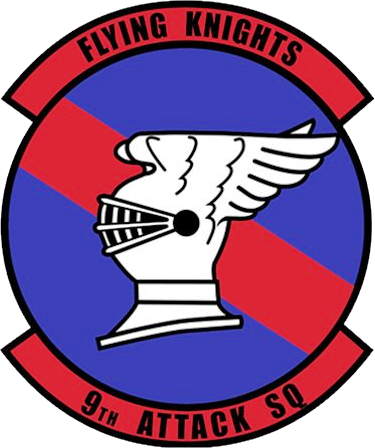
- 9th Attack Squadron emblem (Note: The squadron emblem was modified to bring all elements within the disc at some time between 1963 and 1995. Compare illustrations in Maurer, Combat Squadrons, p, 52 and Endicott, p. 406)

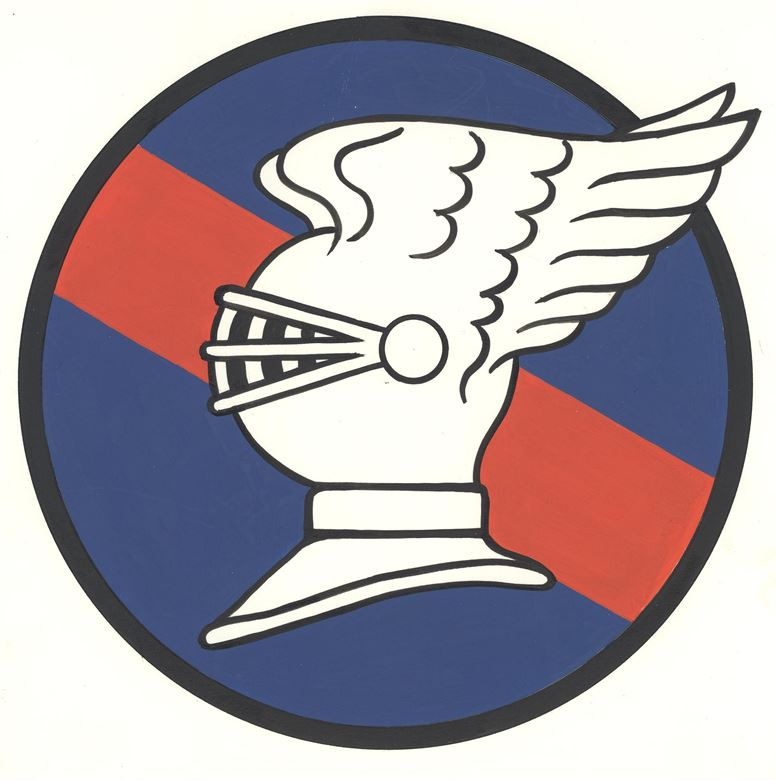
- 9th Fighter Squadron emblem (approved 24 June 1946)

The 9th Attack Squadron is a United States Air Force squadron, assigned to the 49th Operations Group, stationed at Holloman Air Force Base, New Mexico. The squadron is a training unit for new pilots and sensor operators for the MQ-9 Reaper Remotely Piloted Aircraft (RPA).

The 9th is one of three RPA training squadron at Holloman. The squadron was activated to meet Air Force training requirements. The 9th trains Reaper pilot and sensor operators in initial qualification training at Holloman. The base's other MQ-9 squadrons are the 6th and 29th Attack Squadrons.

== History ==
=== World War II ===
The squadron traces its origins to the formation of the 49th Pursuit Group at Selfridge Field, Michigan on 15 January 1941. Originally named the 9th Pursuit Squadron, it was equipped with Seversky P-35s that were transferred from the 1st Pursuit Group that had departed Selfridge for Rockwell Field, California. In May 1941, the squadron proceeded to Morrison Field, Florida, to train in the Curtiss P-40 Warhawk fighter.

With the advent of World War II, the squadron moved to Australia and became part of Fifth Air Force in January 1942. It was redesignated as the 9th Fighter Squadron in May 1942. The unit received Curtiss P-40 Warhawks in Australia and, after training for a short time, provided air defense for the Northern Territory.

The squadron moved to New Guinea in October 1942 to help stall the Japanese drive southward from Buna to Port Moresby. Engaged primarily in air defense of Port Moresby; also escorted bombers and transports, and attacked enemy installations, supply lines, and troop concentrations in support of Allied ground forces.

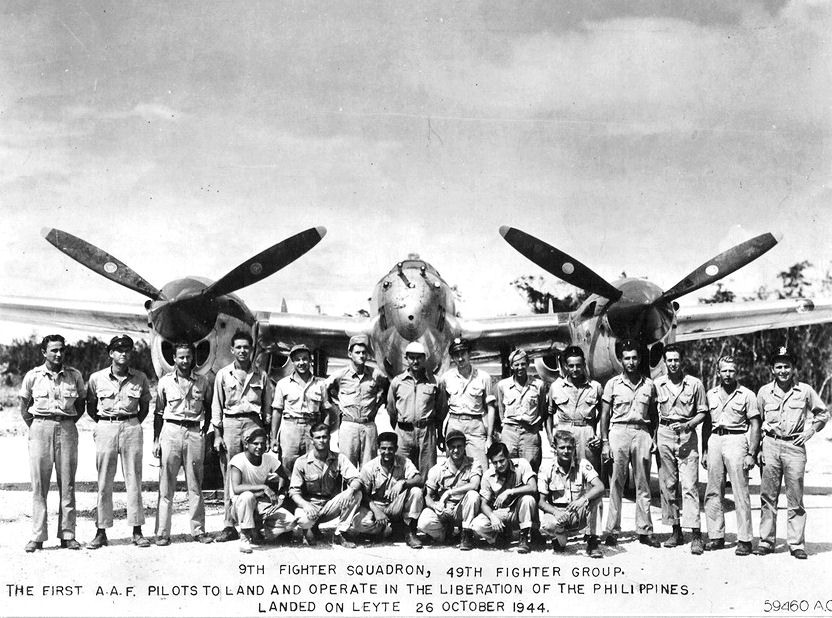
Squadron posing in front of a P-38 Lightning (Note: This was to commemorate the first USAAF pilots to land and operate in the Philippines after the landing on Leyte, October 1944.)

The 9th participated in the Allied offensive that pushed the Japanese back along the Kokoda Track, took part in the Battle of the Bismarck Sea in March 1943, fought for control of the approaches to Huon Gulf, and supported ground forces during the campaign in which the Allies eventually recovered New Guinea. It covered the landings on Noemfoor and had a part in the conquest of Biak.

After having used Lockheed P-38 Lightnings, Curtiss P-40 Warhawks and Republic P-47 Thunderbolts, the 9th was equipped completely in September 1944 with P-38's, which were used to fly long-range escort and attack missions to Mindanao, Halmahera, Seram, and Borneo. The unit arrived in the Philippines in October 1944, shortly after the assault landings on Leyte and engaged enemy fighters, attacked shipping in Ormoc Bay, supported ground forces, and covered the Allied invasion of Luzon. Other missions from the Philippines included strikes against industry and transportation on Taiwan and against shipping along the China coast. The 9th Fighter Squadron and its sister squadrons (7th and 8th Fighter Squadrons) attained a record of 668 aerial victories not matched in the Pacific Theater during World War II.

Aces of the 9th were Dick Bong (40 victories), Thomas McGuire (38 victories), Gerald Johnson (22 victories), (Note: This is not Gerald W. Johnson, a high scoring ace of WW II in the ETO) James Watkins (12 victories), Andrew Reynolds (9.33 victories), Grover Fanning (9 victories), John O'Neil (8 victories), Wallace Jordan (6 victories), John Landers (6 victories), Ralph Wandrey (6 victories), Ernest Ambort (5 victories), Warren Curten (5 victories), Jack Donaldson (5 victories), Cheatam Gupton (5 victories), and Robert Vaught (5 victories)

After V-J Day, the squadron moved to the Japanese Home Islands, initially being stationed at the former Imperial Japanese Navy Atsugi Airfield, near Tokyo on 15 September 1945. Its war-weary P-38 Lightnings were sent back to the United States and the squadron was re-equipped with North American P-51D Mustangs with a mission of both occupation duty and show-of-force flights. In February 1946, the squadron moved to Chitose Air Base, on northern Honshu and assumed an air defense mission over Honshu and also Hokkaido Island. The pilots of the squadron were briefed not to allow any Soviet Air Force aircraft over Japanese airspace, as there was tension between the United States and the Soviet Union about Soviet occupation forces landing on Hokkaido. In April 1948, the squadron moved to the newly rebuilt Misawa Air Base with the 49th Fighter Group. At Misawa, the squadron moved into the jet age when it was re-equipped with the Lockheed F-80C Shooting Star.

=== Korean War ===
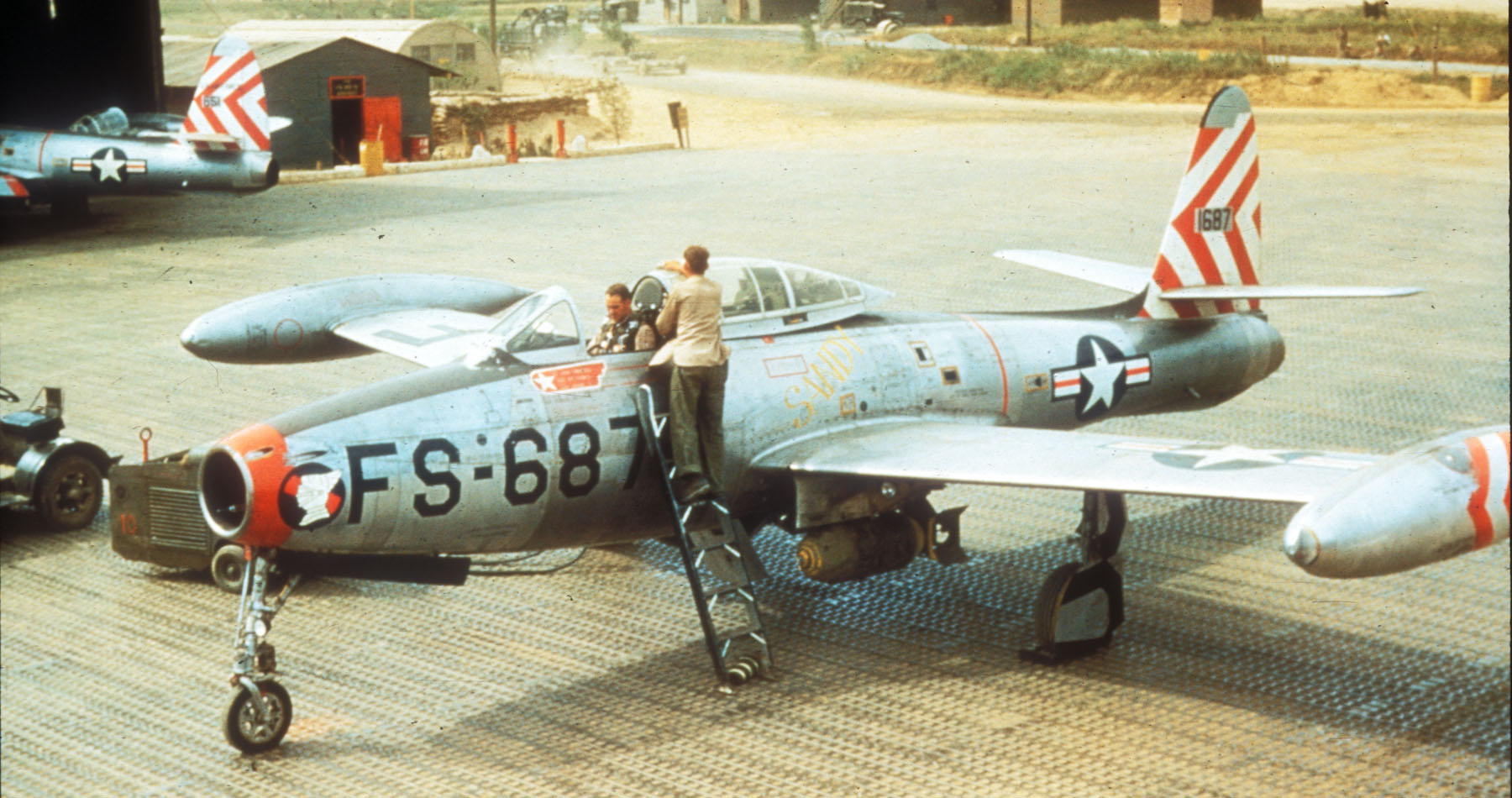
9th FBS F-84E before a mission in 1952 (Note: Aircraft is Republic F-84E Thuderjet, serial 51-687. This plane was shot down by MiG-15s on 9 September 1952. The pilot, Capt. Warren O'Brien, was missing in action.)

With the outbreak of the Korean War in June 1950, the 9th was one of the first USAF squadrons dispatched to Korea from Japan, initially operating propeller-driven F-51Ds to cover the evacuation of civilians from Kimpo and Suwon. Next, it flew close air support missions to help slow the advancing North Korean armies. Later, it turned to the interdiction of enemy troops, supplies and communications from Misawa. However its short-range F-80Cs meant that the 49th had to move to South Korea in order for them to be effective.

The squadron moved to Taegu Air Base (K-2) on 1 October 1950, becoming the first jet fighter outfit to operate from a base in South Korea. During the autumn of 1950 and spring of 1951, the squadron flew daily combat missions from Taegu, flying escort missions for Boeing B-29 Superfortresses over North Korea and engaging Communist Mikoyan-Gurevich MiG-15 fighters in air-to-air combat. When the Chinese Communist Forces intervention gained momentum in 1950–1951, the squadron again concentrated on the ground support mission, attacking Communist Chinese ground units in North Korea, moving south until the line was stabilized and held just south of Seoul.

The 9th changed equipment to the Republic F-84G Thunderjet in mid-1951, It engaged communist forces on the ground in support of the 1st UN Counteroffensive Campaign. Afterwards, it engaged primarily in air interdiction operations against the main enemy channel of transportation, the roads and railroads between Pyongyang and Sinuiju. Also, it flew close air support missions for the ground forces and attacked high-value targets, including the Sui-ho hydroelectric plants in June 1952 and the Kumgang Political School in October 1952. On 27 July 1953, the squadron joined with the 58th Fighter-Bomber Group to bomb Sunan Airfield for the final action of F-84 fighter-bombers during the Korean War.

The wing remained in Korea for a time after the armistice. It moved to Japan in November 1953 and returned to its air defense mission. The squadron upgraded to the North American F-86F Sabre in 1956. By late 1957, however, Worldwide DOD Budget restrictions during FY 1958 meant that the 49th Fighter-Bomber Wing would be inactivated as part of a reduction of the USAF units based in Japan.

=== United States Air Forces in Europe ===
Due to seniority, after the closure of the 49th's base in Japan, it moved on paper to replace the 388th Fighter-Bomber Wing at Étain-Rouvres Air Base, France on 10 December 1957. The 9th assumed the aircraft, personnel and equipment of the 563d Fighter-Bomber Squadron which was inactivated. As the 49th had been a part of American forces in the Pacific since it was sent to Australia in January 1942, the assignment to Europe after fifteen years in the Pacific was a major change for the organization.

Taking over the seven North American F-100D Super Sabres and three dual-seat F-100F trainers of the 563d, the squadron continued its normal peacetime training. The squadron began keeping four of its planes on 15-minute alert (Victor Alert) on 1 February 1958 so a portion of the squadron could react quickly in an emergency. During the fall of 1958, most of the squadron operated from Chalon-Vatry Air Base while the runway at Etain was being repaired and resurfaced.

However, the nuclear-capable F-100 was troublesome to the host French Government, the French decreed that all United States nuclear weapons and delivery aircraft had to be removed from French soil by July 1958. As a result, the F-100s of the 49th Wing had to be removed from France. After negotiations with the French, the 49th's commander was informed that the wing would be departing from France on 1 July 1959 and be moved to Spangdahlem Air Base, West Germany. During the relocation to West Germany, the squadron deployed to Wheelus Air Base, Libya, for gunnery training. However, not all squadron personnel moved to Spangdahlem, as many of the 10th Tactical Reconnaissance Wing personnel there were almost at the end of their tours and did not want to move to RAF Alconbury, where the 10th was being relocated to in order to accommodate the 49th. As a result, some squadron ground support personnel instead moved to RAF Lakenheath, England to backfill vacancies there, while the 10th's personnel at Spandahlem were allowed to finish out their assignments.

At Spangdahlem, the squadron flew F-100s until 1961 when it converted to the Republic F-105 Thunderchief, commonly known as the "Thud". The 49th was only the third USAF unit to operate the F-105. As part of United States Air Forces Europe, the 9th participated in many NATO exercises. In February 1967, the 9th opened the 49th weapons training detachment at Wheelus Air Base, Libya, to begin transition to the McDonnell F-4D Phantom II, and received its first F-4D on 9 March 1967.

In the late 1960s, the defense budget began to be squeezed by the costs of the ongoing Vietnam War. Secretary of Defense Robert MacNamara decided to reduce costs in Europe by "Dual Basing" United States military units in Europe by returning them permanently to the United States, and conducting annual deployment exercises in Europe, giving the units a NATO commitment for deployment to bases in Europe if tensions with the Soviet Union warranted an immediate military buildup. The 49th Tactical Fighter Wing returned to the United States under this policy, moving on 1 July 1968 to Holloman Air Force Base, New Mexico, to serve as the US Air Force's first dual-based, NATO-committed wing.

=== Holloman Air Force Base ===
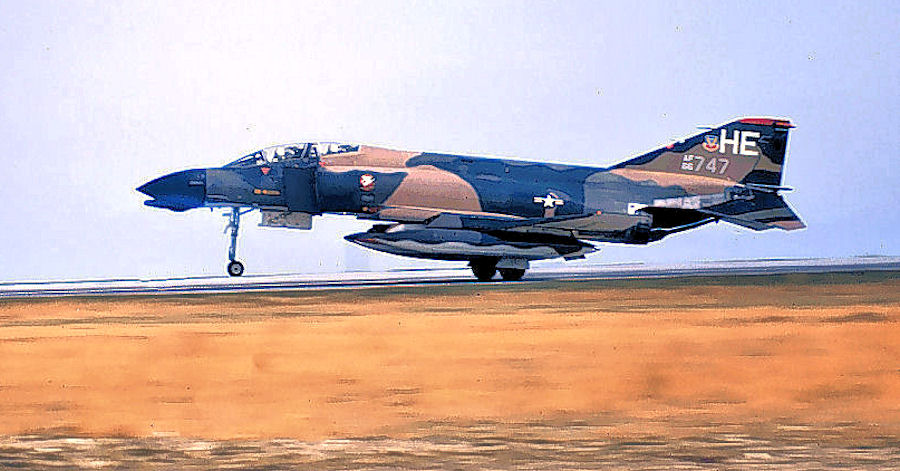
9th Tactical Fighter Squadron F-4D Phantom II, about 1970 (Note: Aircraft is McDonnell F-4D-28-MC Phantom II, serial 65-747. Note the squadron "HE" tail code.)

At Holloman, the squadron participated in Tactical Air Command (TAC) tactical exercises and firepower demonstrations to maintain combat readiness. Also, the first Tail Codes to identify squadron aircraft were applied, rather than the traditional red colors of the 9th which had been used since the Korean War. Initially "HE" was the tail code identifier for the 9th, however, in 1972, the Air Force issued AFM 66-1 which specified wing tail codes and the squadron's planes were standardized on the 49th's "HO" tail code. However, a red tail stripe was applied to identify squadron aircraft.

The 9th also retained its NATO commitment to return once a year to its "dual base" home in West Germany. These deployments were known as "Crested Cap", and were as follows:

- Bitburg Air Base, West Germany, 11 September – 6 October 1970 (F-4D)
- Hahn Air Base, West Germany, 11 September – 7 October 1971 (F-4D)
- Bitburg Air Base, West Germany, 3 February – 15 March 1973 (F-4D)
- Bitburg Air Base, West Germany, 6 September – 7 October 1975 (F-4D)
- Hahn Air Base, West Germany, 22 September – 21 October 1976 (F-4D)
- Ramstein Air Base, West Germany, 11 September – 10 October 1977 (F-4D)

With the end of the Cold War and subsequent force drawdowns by USAFE, these exercises ended in 1991.

==== Takhli Royal Thai Air Force Base ====
On 4 May 1972, after North Vietnam invaded South Vietnam, the entire 49th Wing, except for a rear echelon that remained to run Holloman, deployed at Takhli Royal Thai Air Force Base, Thailand. Operation Constant Guard III, ordered in response to the North Vietnamese invasion, was the largest movement that TAC had ever performed. In nine days, the squadron deployed its F-4D Phantom IIs from Holloman to Takhli. Airmen arriving reported that Takhli was a mess, with missing or broken plumbing fixtures, no hot water, and no drinking water – that had to be trucked in from Korat every day. Bed frames had been thrown out of the hootches into the high snake-infested grass, and mattresses or bedding consisted of sleeping bags at best.

The 9th flew combat sorties in South Vietnam, Cambodia, and Laos from 1 July to 24 September 1972 during Operation Linebacker, the bombardment campaign in North Vietnam. During Operation Constant Guard, the squadron flew over just about every battle zone from An Loc to vital installations in the Hanoi vicinity. During five months of combat, the squadron did not lose any aircraft or personnel. The unit officially closed out its Southwest Asia duty 6 October 1972.

==== F-15A Eagle era ====
In October 1977, the 49th Wing ended its "dual-base" commitment to NATO and changed to an air superiority mission with the wing beginning a conversion from the F-4D Phantom II to the McDonnell Douglas F-15A Eagle; the 49th being the second USAF operational wing to receive the F-15A. The transition was completed 4 June 1978.

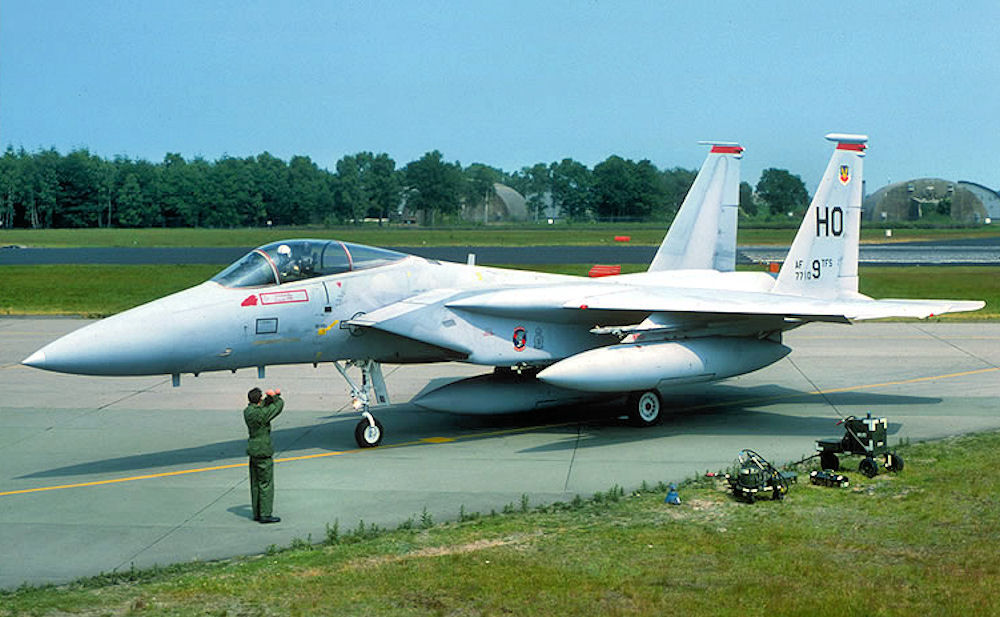
9th Squadron commander's aircraft, about 1980 (Note: Aircraft is McDonnell Douglas F-15A-MC Eagle, serial 77-109.)

Due to the change in equipment, the annual NATO deployments were taken over by the 4th Tactical Fighter Wing at Seymour Johnson Air Force Base, in 1978. However they resumed (although not on an annual basis) in 1981. In the United States, training missions was refocused on dissimilar air combat tactics for mulch-theater operations, participating in numerous Red Flags, Joint Training exercises, and deployments in the air defense/superiority mission. Frequent deployments were made to Nellis Air Force Base, Nevada to exercise with the Northrop F-5E Tiger II aggressor aircraft of the 57th Fighter Weapons Wing, and other aircraft types (including clandestine exercises with Soviet aircraft flown by the 4477th Test and Evaluation Squadron at Tonopah Test Range Airport, Nevada). Also, after TAC absorbed the interceptor mission of Aerospace Defense Command in 1979, the squadron maintained the TAC North American Air Defense (NORAD)air defense alert commitment in the Eagle, with the best scramble times in NORAD.

With the introduction of the F-15C Eagle in the mid-1980s, the upgraded Eagle began replacing the F-15A/Bs in service with all of the USAF units that had previously been operating the Eagle with the exception of the 49th Wing. By the time of Operation Desert Storm in 1991, the F-15A Eagles at Holloman had been relegated to a training role; combat deployments of the Eagle were the purview of F-15C units. However, F-15As of the squadron deployed to Southwest Asia to fly combat air patrol for coalition operations from, 20 June – 5 December 1991.

==== German Air Force Flying Training Center ====
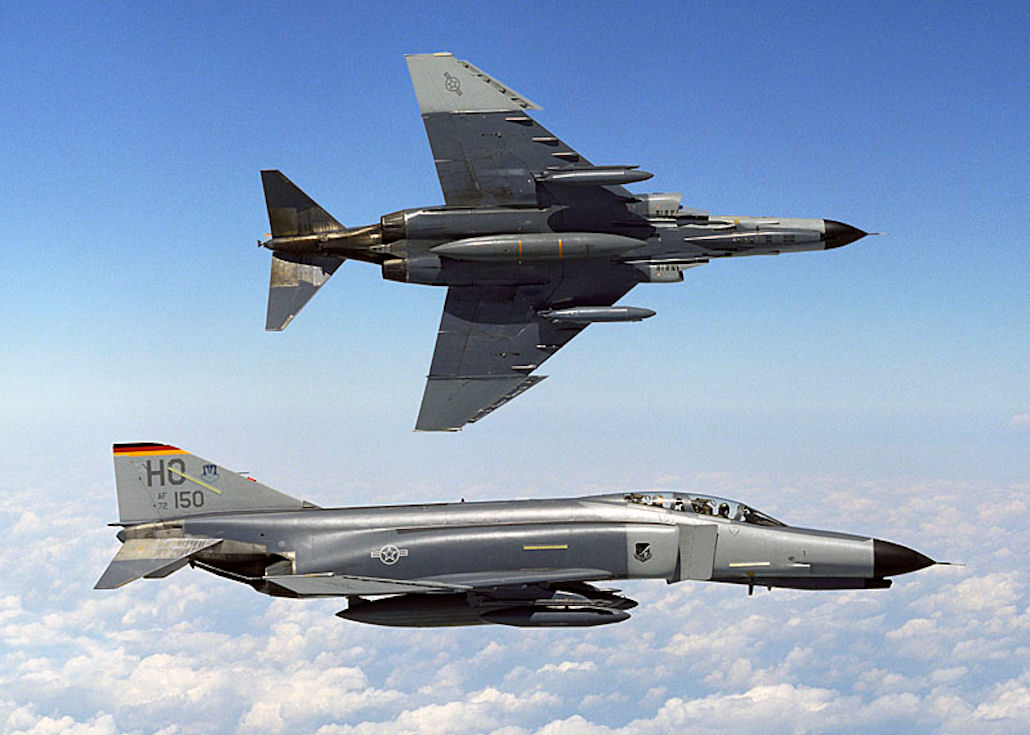
Two F-4Fs over the skies of Holloman AFB (Note: Lead is McDonnell F-4F-MC Phantom II, serial 72-1150.)

With the closure of George Air Force Base, California, the German Air Force F-4F Phantom II training which was held in the western United States was transferred to Holloman effective 5 June 1992, and the 9th made an equipment change from the F-15A to the F-4F Phantom II. The aircraft used to train Luftwaffe crews in the United States, and were operated with U.S. national markings and given USAF tailcodes (HO). This assignment lasted one year for the 9th, when the Luftwaffe training mission was reassigned to the reactivated 20th Fighter Squadron.

==== F-117 Nighthawk era ====
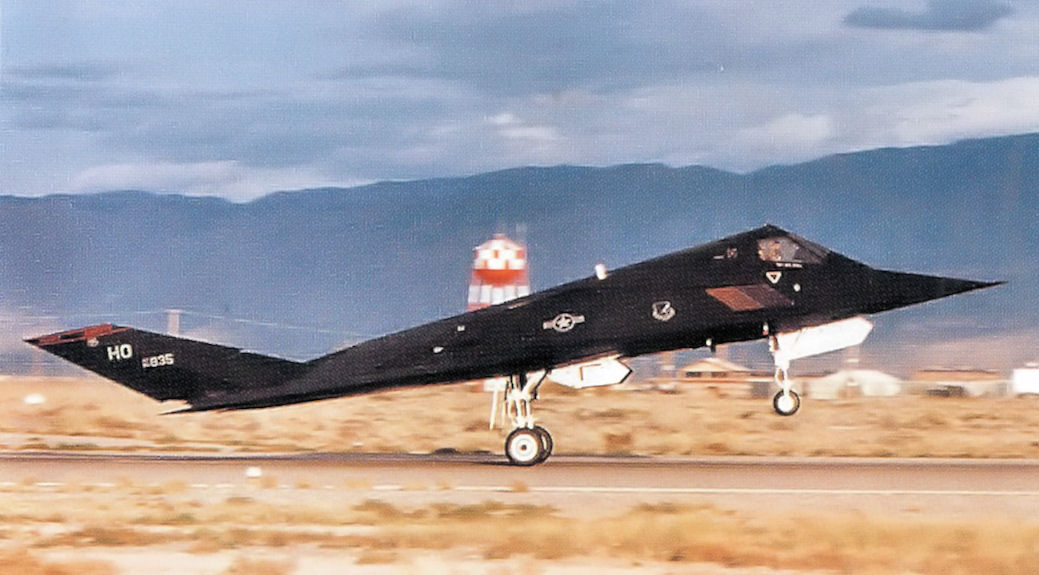
9th Fighter Squadron F-117A Nighthawk 85-0835 taking off from Holloman AFB

As a result of the end of the Cold War, reduced defense budgets were the order of the day. As a result, in July 1993, the 9th received the Lockheed F-117A Nighthawk Stealth Fighters of the 37th Fighter Wing 417th Fighter Squadron, which was subsequently inactivated.

When the squadron received its F-117s from Tonopah, initially it was the training squadron, as the aircraft were the first pre-production aircraft that were manufactured in 1979 and 1980. The 9th also received several T-38 trainers from the 417th FS. The early-model F-117s however, were upgraded to production standards and each of the three squadrons (7th and 8th) were transferred some T-38s and formed their own training flights.

The 9th deployed F-117s fighters deployed to the Gulf in 1998 during Operation Desert Fox to upgrade the strike force's capability to attack high-value targets. But the 18-hour flight from Holloman AFB to Kuwait meant that the operation was over before the F-117 aircraft arrived in the Gulf. The F-117s successfully penetrated the heavily defended areas, which conventional aircraft could not reach. Also, the 9th deployed to Kunsan Air Base, South Korea and flew deterrence missions along the Demilitarized Zone to deter North Korean aggression in the late 1990s.

===== Operation Allied Force =====
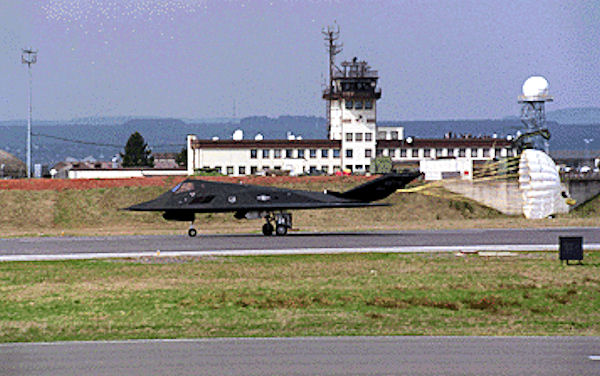
9th Fighter Squadron F-117A landing at Spangdahlem Air Base

In early 1999, the 9th deployed F-117s and their crews to Spangdahlem Air Base, Germany as the 9th Expeditionary Fighter Squadron under the 49th Expeditionary Operations Group. The 9th launched its first combat sortie only 33 hours after departing Holloman in support of Operation Allied Force, the NATO attempt to stop ethnic cleansing in Kosovo in the former nation of Yugoslavia. In the opening phase of the operation, aimed primarily at Yugoslavia's integrated air defense system, NATO air forces conducted more than 400 sorties. During the first two night attacks, allied air forces struck 90 targets throughout Yugoslavia and in Kosovo. The F-117s were chosen for the missions due to their low-observable construction.

One F-117 fighter was lost over Yugoslavia on 27 March 1999, apparently struck by a salvo of SA-3 Goa surface-to-air missiles. Unknown to NATO, Yugoslav air defenses operators had found they could detect F-117s with their "obsolete" Soviet radars after some modifications that could detect the aircraft when their wheels were down or bomb bay doors were open. A US search and rescue team picked up the pilot several hours after the F-117 went down outside Belgrade. This was the only F-117 to have been lost in action. On 1 April 1999, Defense Secretary William Cohen directed 12 more F-117 stealth fighters to join NATO Operation Allied Force, to join the total of 24 F-117s that were participating in NATO Operation Allied Force.

In June 1999 the 7th Fighter Squadron took over the pilot transition training mission to the F-117A and the Northrop T-38 Talon trainers were transferred to the redesignated 7th Combat Training Squadron.

===== F-117A Retirement =====
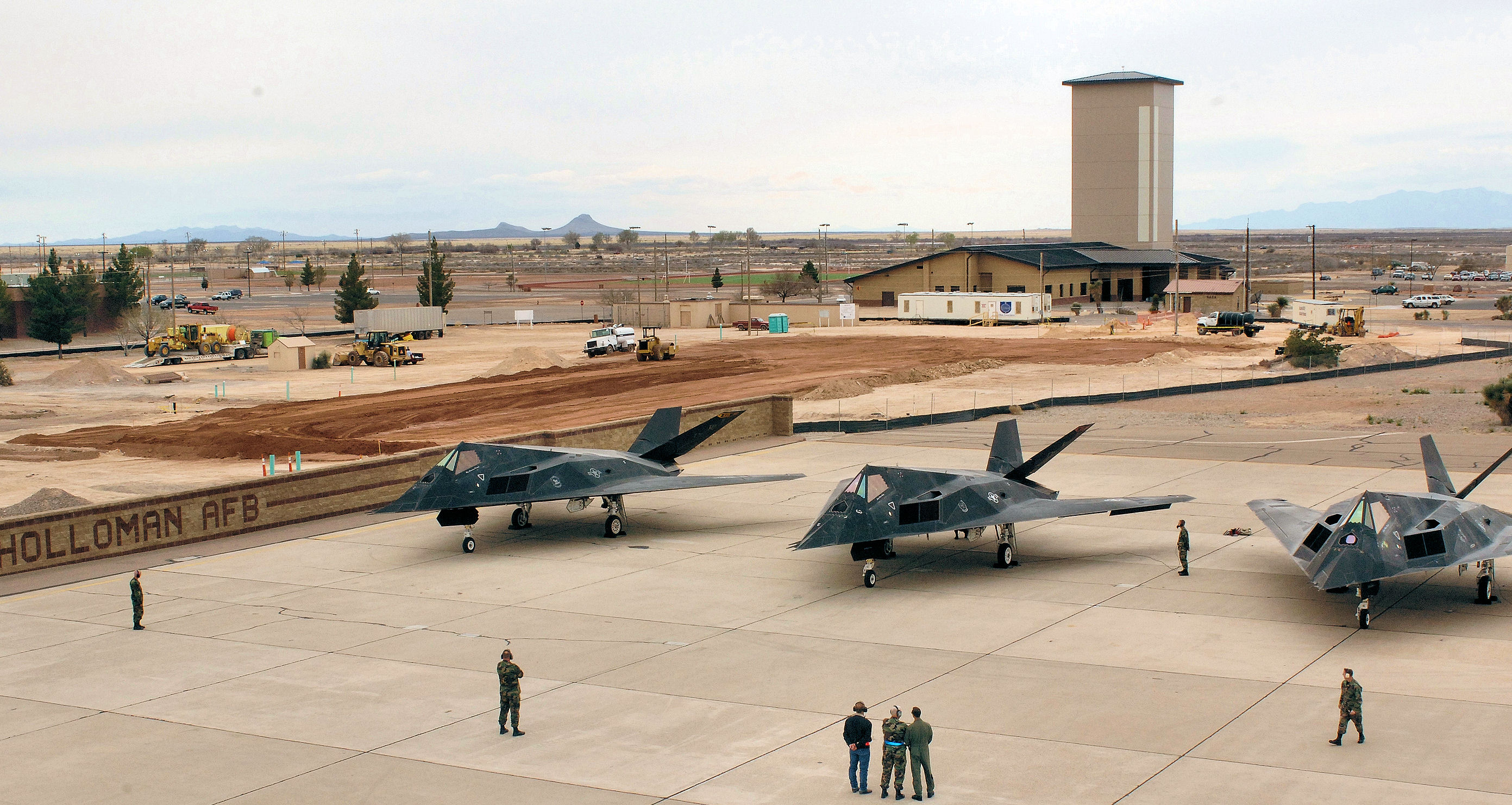
F-117A Retirement ceremony at Holloman, April 2008.

The 9th continued training with the F-117 into the 2000s, however the squadron did not deploy to the Middle East after the 9-11 Terrorist attacks and the removal from power of Saddam Hussein during Operation Iraqi Freedom in March 2003.

In 2006 the Air Force announced that although it had planned to operate the Nighthawk until at least 2011, with the introduction of the Lockheed Martin F-22A Raptor, a fighter that features the latest stealth technology, the Pentagon decided to retire the F-117s and use the funds that would have been used to maintain the Nighthawk on additional Raptors. Beginning in the spring of 2008, the 9th's planes began to depart for Tonopah Airport, and by 16 May the last of the 9th's aircraft had returned to their original base, for long-term storage in the hangars there, as the stealth technology of the planes was still considered classified, even in retirement. With the departure of its aircraft, the squadron became a "paper" unit, with no personnel or equipment assigned to it. It was never officially inactivated.

===== Attack squadron =====
On 4 October 2012, the squadron was redesignated the 9th Attack Squadron at Holloman, training new pilots and sensor operators for the MQ-9 Reaper.

== Lineage ==
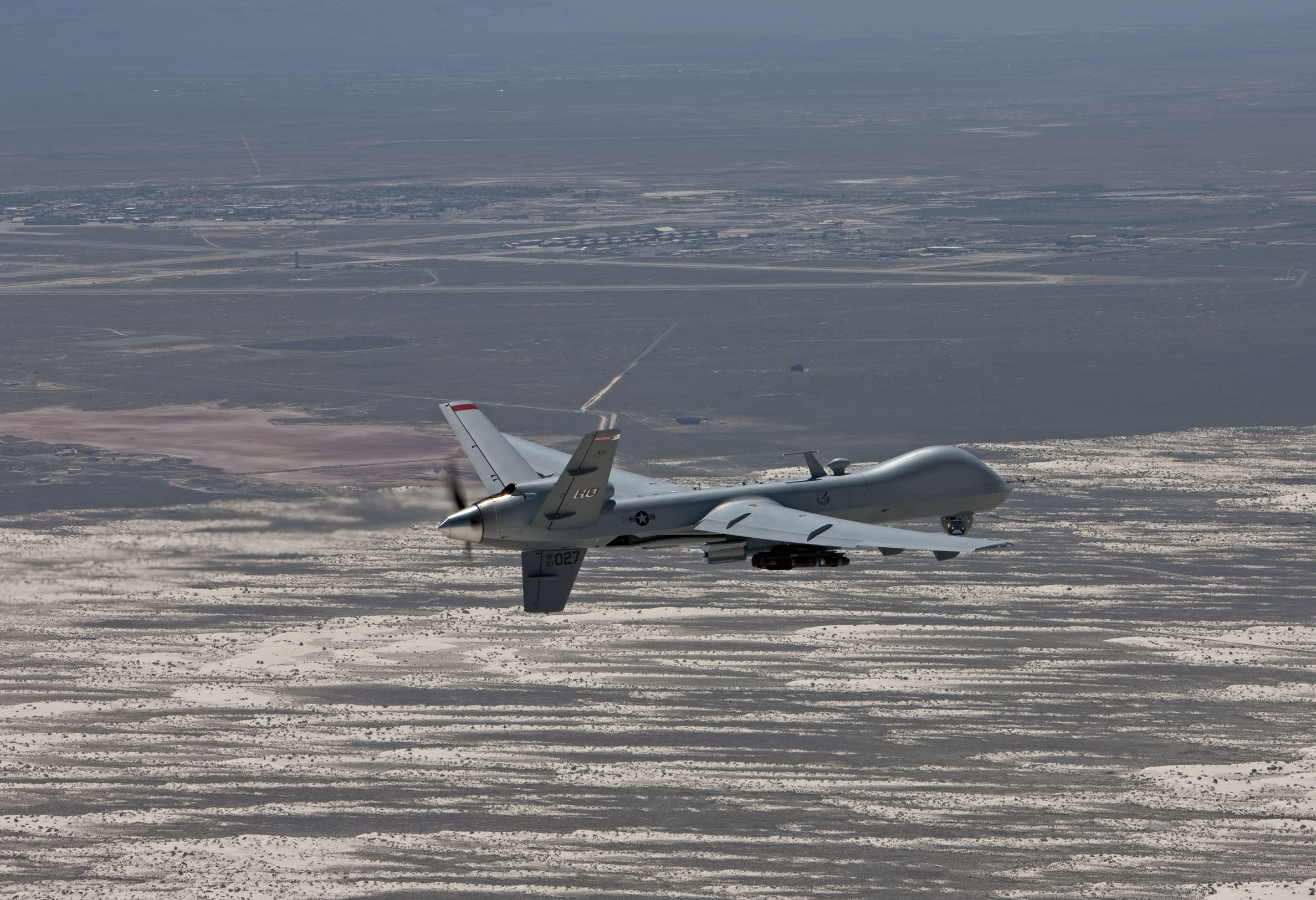
- 9th Attack Squadron MQ-9 Reaper over Holloman Air Force Base
  Constituted as the 9th Pursuit Squadron (Interceptor) on 20 November 1940

Activated on 15 January 1941
Redesignated 9th Fighter Squadron on 15 May 1942
Redesignated 9th Fighter Squadron, Twin Engine on 25 January 1943
Redesignated 9th Fighter Squadron, Single Engine on 19 February 1944
Redesignated 9th Fighter Squadron, Two Engine on 6 November 1944
Redesignated 9th Fighter Squadron, Single Engine on 8 January 1946
Redesignated 9th Fighter Squadron, Jet Propelled on 1 May 1948
Redesignated 9th Fighter Squadron, Jet on 10 August 1948
Redesignated 9th Fighter-Bomber Squadron on 1 February 1950
Redesignated 9th Tactical Fighter Squadron on 8 July 1958
Redesignated 9th Fighter Squadron on 1 November 1991

- Redesignated 9th Attack Squadron on 4 October 2012

=== Assignments ===
- 49th Pursuit Group (later 49th Fighter Group, 49th Fighter-Bomber Group), 15 January 1941

Attached to Japan Air Defense Force, 17 December 1952 – November 1953; 49th Fighter-Bomber Wing, 17 August–c. 6 September 1950 and after 15 April 1957)

- 49th Fighter-Bomber Wing (later 49th Tactical Fighter Wing, 49th Fighter Wing, 10 December 1957

Attached to 36th Tactical Fighter Wing, c. 12 September–c. 11 October 1970, 4 February – 15 March 1973 and 6 September – 7 October 1975; 50th Tactical Fighter Wing, 9 September – 7 October 1971, 22 September – 21 October 1976; 86th Tactical Fighter Wing, 10 September – 10 October 1977

- 49th Operations Group, 15 November 1991 – present

=== Stations ===
- Selfridge Field, Michigan, 15 Jan 1941
- Morrison Field, Florida, 22 May 1941 – 4 Jan 1942
- Essendon Airport, Melbourne, Australia, 2 Feb 1942
- RAAF Base Williamtown, Australia, 14 Feb 1942
- RAAF Base Darwin, Australia, 17 Mar 1942
- Schwimmer Airfield (14 Mile Drome), Port Moresby, New Guinea, c. 10 Oct 1942
- Dobodura Airfield Complex, Dobodura, New Guinea, 6 Mar 1943
- Gusap Airfield, New Guinea, 16 Dec 1943
- Hollandia Airfield Complex, New Guinea, 16 May 1944
- Mokmer Airfield, Biak, 26 Jun 1944
- Tacloban Airfield, Leyte, 24 Oct 1944
- McGuire Field, San Jose, Mindoro, 30 Dec 1944
- Lingayen Airfield, Luzon, 26 Feb 1945
- Okinawa, 16 Aug 1945
- Atsugi Airfield, Japan, 15 Sep 1945
- Chitose Air Base, Japan, 17 Feb 1946
- Misawa Air Base, Japan, 26 Mar 1948
- Itazuke Air Base, Japan, 27 Jun 1950
- Misawa Air Base, Japan, c. 15 Aug 1950
- Itazuke Air Base, Japan, 17 Sep 1950
- Taegu Air Base (K-2), South Korea, c. 30 Sep 1950
- Komaki AB, Japan, Dec 1952-10 Dec 1957
- Étain-Rouvres Air Base, France, 10 Dec 1957
- Spangdahlem Air Base, West Germany, 25 Aug 1959 – 15 Jul 1968
- Holloman Air Force Base, New Mexico, 15 Jul 1968 – present

Deployed to Bitburg Air Base, West Germany, c. 12 Sep-c. 11 Oct 1970, 4 Feb – 15 Mar 1973 and 6 Sep – 7 Oct 1975; Hahn Air Base, West Germany, 9 Sep – 7 Oct 1971, 22 Sep – 21 Oct 1976; Takhli Royal Thai Air Force Base, Thailand, 13 May – 5 Oct 1972; Ramstein Air Base, West Germany, 10 Sep – 10 Oct 1977; Soesterburg AB, Netherlands, May 1986 to June 1986

=== Aircraft ===
- Seversky P-35, 1941
- Curtiss P-40 Warhawk, 1942–1944
- Republic P-47 Thunderbolt, 1943–1944
- Lockheed P-38 Lightning, 1944–1946
- North American P-51 Mustang, 1946–1949, 1950
- Lockheed F-80 Shooting Star, 1948–1951
- Republic F-84 Thunderjet, 1951–1957
- North American F-100 Super Sabre, 1957–1962
- Republic F-105 Thunderchief, 1962–1967
- McDonnell F-4D Phantom II, 1967–1978
- McDonnell Douglas F-15A Eagle, 1978–1992
- McDonnell F-4F Phantom II, 1992–1993
- Northrop T-38 Talon, 1992–2008
- Lockheed F-117A Nighthawk, 1992–2008
- MQ-9 Reaper, 2012–Present
