= 29th Reconnaissance Squadron =

29th Reconnaissance Squadron may refer to:

- The 419th Flight Test Squadron, designated the 29th Reconnaissance Squadron (Heavy) from February 1942 to April 1942.
- The 29th Reconnaissance Squadron (Fighter) active from April 1943 to August 1943.
- The 29th Attack Squadron, designated the 29th Reconnaissance Squadron (Night Photographic) from January 1946 to July 1946.

== See also ==
- The 29th Photographic Reconnaissance Squadron, a component of the 2d Photographic Reconnaissance Group
- The 29th Tactical Reconnaissance Squadron
