= 13th Reconnaissance Squadron (disambiguation) =

The 13th Reconnaissance Squadron is an active United States Air Force Unit, originally constituted as the 13th Photographic Reconnaissance Squadron in June 1942. It has held this designation since March 2005.

13th Reconnaissance Squadron may also refer to:

- The 403d Bombardment Squadron, designated the 13th Reconnaissance Squadron (Heavy) from January 1941 to April 1942.
- The 29th Attack Squadron, designated the 13th Reconnaissance Squadron (Fighter) from April 1943 to August 1943.

== See also ==
- The 13th Photographic Reconnaissance Squadron
- The 13th Tactical Reconnaissance Squadron
