= 49th Operations Group =

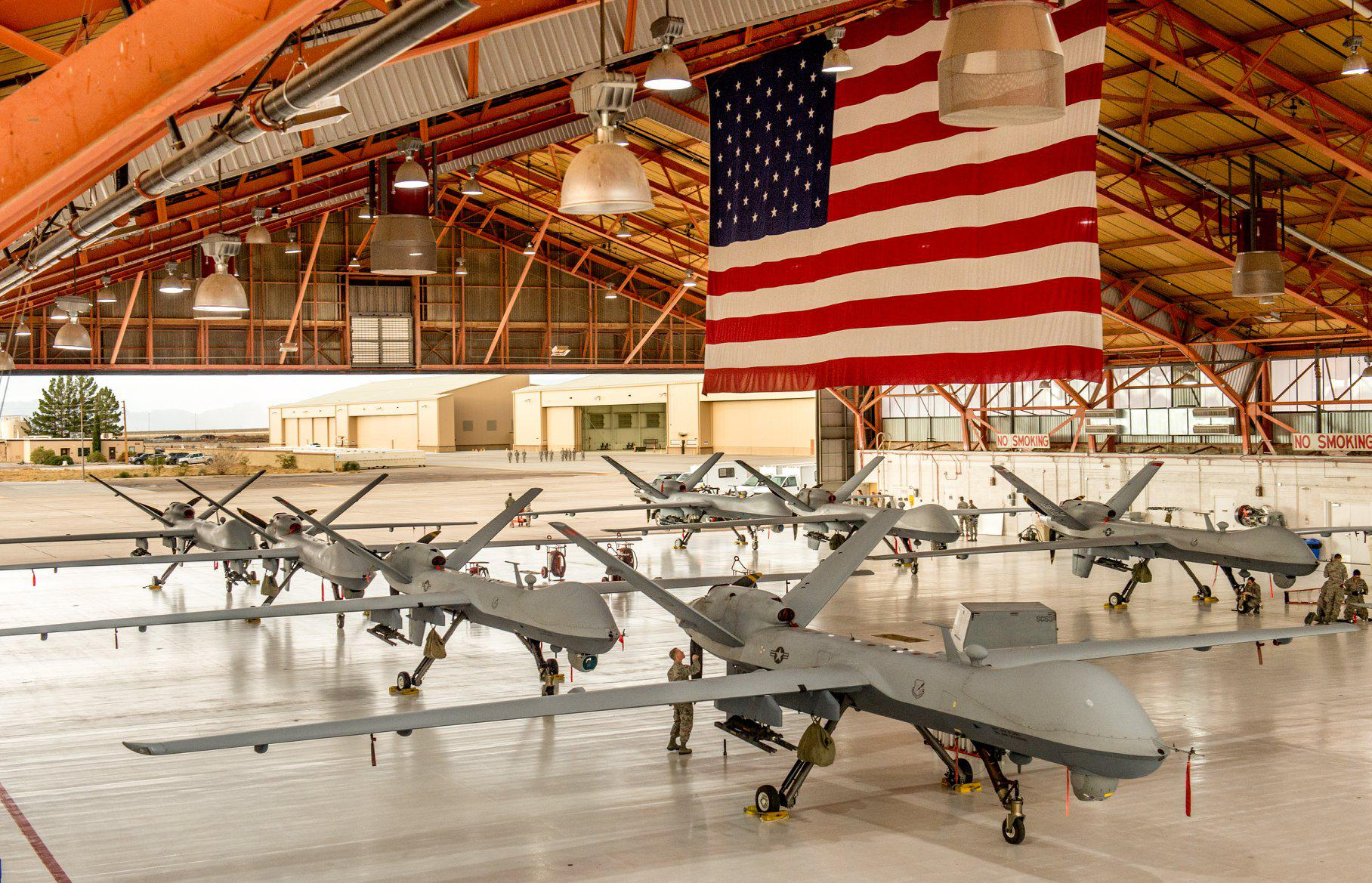
- 49th Operations Group MQ-9 Reapers at Holloman Air Force Base
- Active: 1941–1957; 1991–present
- Country: United States
- Branch: United States Air Force
- Type: Group
- Role: Combat Operations
- Mottos: Tutor et Ultor – "I Protect and Avenge"
- Engagements: World War II (Asia-Pacific Theater) Korean War Kosovo Campaign Global War on Terrorism

- Decorations: Distinguished Unit Citation (5x) Air Force Meritorious Unit Award Air Force Outstanding Unit Award (3x) Philippine Presidential Unit Citation Republic of Korea Presidential Unit Citation (2x)

Insignia
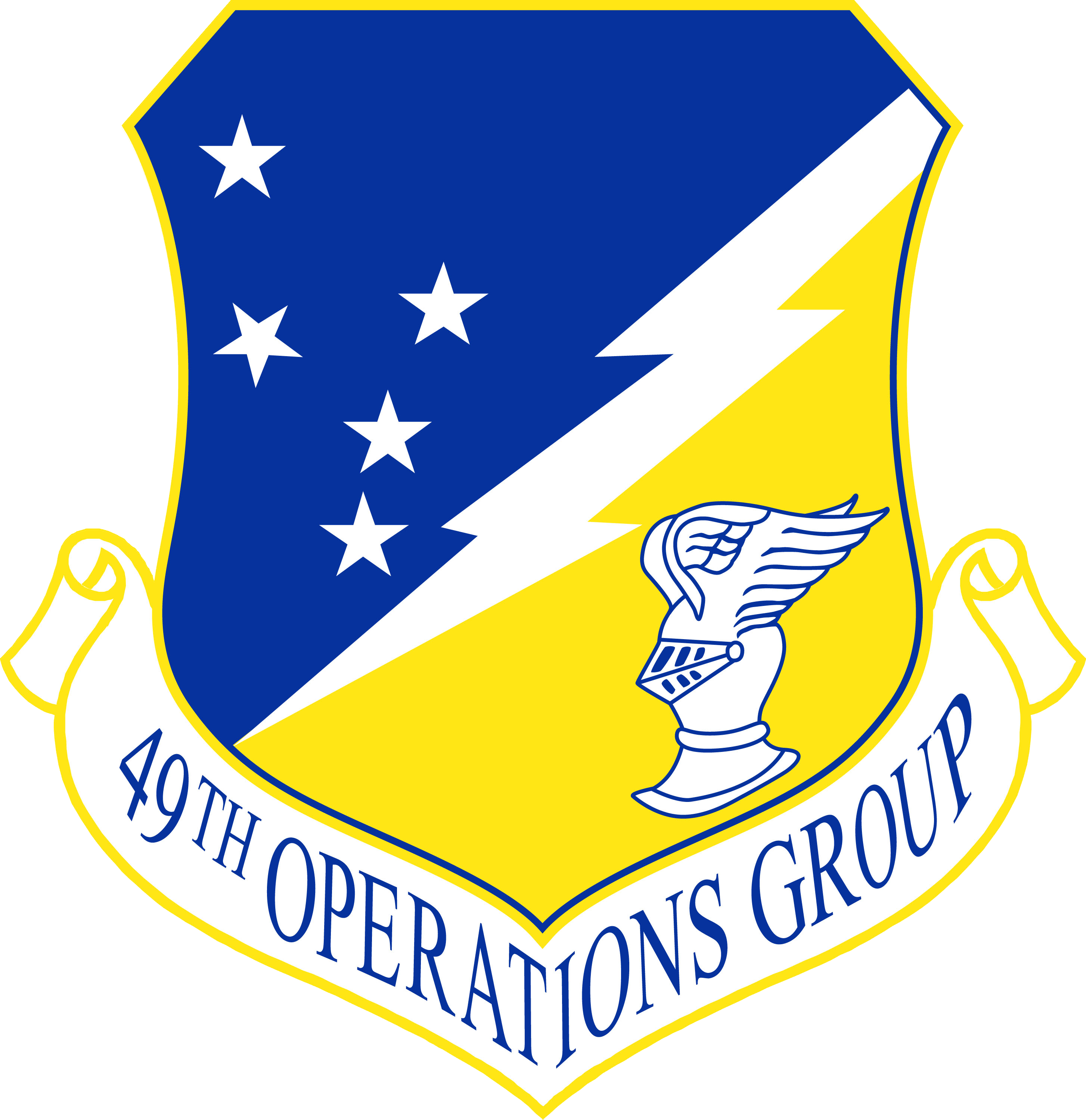
- 49th Operations Group emblem

The 49th Operations Group (49 OG) is the operational flying component of the United States Air Force 49th Wing. It is stationed at Holloman Air Force Base, New Mexico, and is a part of Air Combat Command (ACC).

During World War II, the unit's predecessor unit, the 49th Fighter Group, operated primarily in the Southwest Pacific Theater as part of the Fifth Air Force. The group earned three Distinguished Unit Citations (DUC) for engaging the enemy in frequent and intense aerial combat in numerous campaigns between 1942 and 1945. During the Korean War, the unit initially covered the evacuation of civilian personnel from Kimpo and Suwon in 1950, later flying missions in support of UN ground forces, hitting gun positions, troop concentrations, and other objectives until the 1953 Armistice, remaining in South Korea for a time afterward.

After the fall of the Soviet Union, 49th Operations group F-117A Stealth fighters were engaged in combat during Operation Allied Force in 1999, and in Operation Iraqi Freedom in 2003.

== Overview ==
The 49th Operations Group (Tail Code: "HO") conducts training using the MQ-9 Reaper.

Units of the 49th Operations Group are:

- 49th Operations Support Squadron

The 49th Operations Support Squadron is made up of seven flights including Weather, Aircrew Flight Equipment, Airfield Operations, White Sands Radar, Intelligence, Current Operations and Weapons and Tactics. These flights support the wing, tenant units and Army's White Sands Missile Range. The Weather Flight provides operational observing, forecasting and staff weather support. They provide 26 specific types of weather warnings and advisories to 60 base agencies to ensure resource protection and flight safety of base assets worth over $7 billion.

- 6th Attack Squadron (MQ-9)

A USAF FTU (Formal Training Unit) where pilots and sensor operators undergo Initial Qualification Training to operate the MQ-9 Reaper. On 23 October 2009, the 6th was reactivated as the 6th Reconnaissance Squadron at Holloman AFB and assumed its mission of providing Initial Qualification Training for pilots and sensor operators learning to operate the MQ-1 Predator remotely piloted aircraft. It eventually retired the MQ-1 and began training students on the MQ-9.

- 9th Attack Squadron (MQ-9)

On 4 October 2012, the 9th Fighter Squadron was redesignated and activated as the 9th Attack Squadron which will train new pilots and sensor operators for the MQ-9 Reaper.

- 16th Training Squadron

Provides academic and simulator instruction to pilots and sensor operators learning to fly the MQ-9 Reaper remotely piloted aircraft, using the Predator Mission Aircrew Training System.

- 29th Attack Squadron (MQ-9)

A USAF FTU where pilots and sensor operators undergo Initial Qualification Training to operate the MQ-9 Reaper.

- 491st Attack Squadron (MQ-9)
- 492d Attack Squadron (MQ-9)

A USAF FTU where pilots and sensor operators undergo Initial Qualification Training to operate the MQ-9 Reaper.

== History ==
For additional lineage and history, see 49th Fighter Wing

=== World War II ===
The 49th Operations Group traces its origins to the formation of the 49th Pursuit Group (Interceptor) at Selfridge Field, Michigan on 20 November 1940. The group trained with Seversky P-35s and consisted of three operational squadrons (7th, 8th, and 9th).

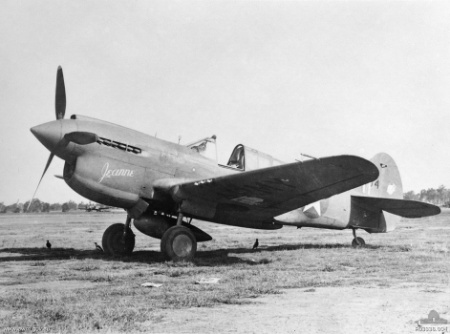
P-40E of the 7th Fighter Squadron – 49th Fighter Group – Australia – March 1942

With the advent of World War II, the group moved to Australia and became part of Fifth Air Force in January 1942. It was re-designated as the 49th Fighter Group in May 1942. The unit received Curtiss P-40 Warhawks in Australia and, after training for a short time, provided air defense for the Northern Territory, being awarded a Distinguished Unit Citation for engaging the enemy in frequent and intense aerial combat while operating with limited materiel and facilities for the period March–August 1942.

The group moved to New Guinea in October 1942 to help stall the Japanese drive southward from Buna to Port Moresby. Engaged primarily in air defense of Port Moresby; also escorted bombers and transports, and attacked enemy installations, supply lines, and troop concentrations in support of Allied ground forces.

The 49th participated in the Allied offensive that pushed the Japanese back along the Kokoda Track, took part in the Battle of the Bismarck Sea in March 1943, fought for control of the approaches to Huon Gulf, and supported ground forces during the campaign in which the Allies eventually recovered New Guinea. It covered the landings on Noemfoor and had a part in. the conquest of Biak.

After having used Lockheed P-38 Lightnings, Curtiss P-40 Warhawks and Republic P-47 Thunderbolts, the 49th was equipped completely in September 1944 with P-38's, which were used to fly long-range escort and attack missions to Mindanao, Halmahera, Seram, and Borneo. The unit arrived in the Philippines in October 1944, shortly after the assault landings on Leyte and engaged enemy fighters, attacked shipping in Ormoc Bay, supported ground forces, and covered the Allied invasion of Luzon. For or intensive operations against the Japanese on Leyte, the group was awarded a Distinguished Unit Citation.

Other missions from the Philippines included strikes against industry and transportation on Formosa and against shipping along the China coast. By the war's end, the group's pilots destroyed 668 enemy aircraft (there may be some disagreement here as the 49th group site lists 678 but most sources agree at 668), a record surpassing that of any other fighter group in the Pacific Theater. The group's World War II activities merited two Philippines Republic Presidential Unit Citations, three U.S. Distinguished Unit Citations, and 10 battle honors. Among the unit's 43 aces were Lt. Colonel Boyd D. "Buzz" Wagner, the first World War II ace in the Pacific Theater, and Major Richard I. Bong, whose 40 kills made him America's number one ace (a record that still stands). The 49th soon became endeared to the American people through the nickname, "Fighting 49ers."

=== Cold War ===
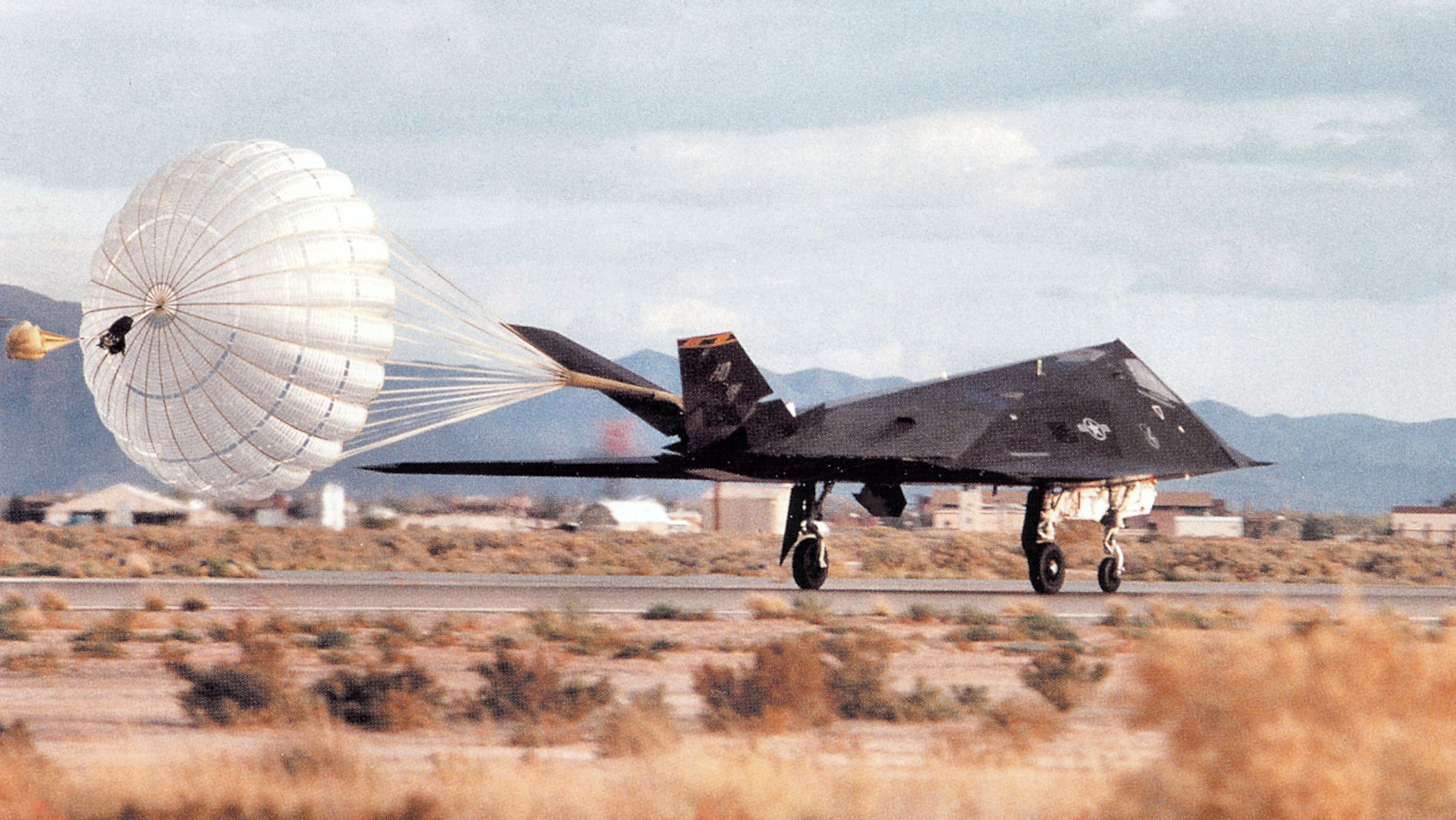
8th Fighter Squadron F-117A Nighthawk stealth fighter 86-0840 landing at Holloman AFB, New Mexico, 2000.

The 49th moved to Okinawa in August 1945 and to Japan in September. As part of the Army of occupation in Japan, the 49th Fighter Group trained, took part in maneuvers, and flew surveillance patrols, as part of Far East Air Forces. The group was equipped with North American P-51 Mustangs in 1946, with Lockheed F-80 Shooting Stars being added in 1948.

On 10 August 1948, with the adoption of the Hobson Plan, the United States Air Force 49th Fighter Wing was activated, with the 49th Fighter Group being assigned as its combat group. From this point, the history of the 49th Fighter Group is indistinguishable from that of the 49th Fighter Wing. Significant changes to the organization were:

- On 1 February 1950, the group was re-designated as the 49th Fighter-Bomber Group
- On 10 December 1957, the 49th Fighter-Bomber Group was inactivated when the wing adopted the Dual Deputy Organization and assigned all combat squadrons directly to the wing; the combat group commander becoming the wing Deputy Commander for Operations (DCO). The honors and history of the Group were temporarily bestowed to the 49th Fighter-Bomber Wing upon inactivation of the Group.
- On 31 July 1985, while inactive, the group was re-designated as the 49th Tactical Fighter Group

=== After the fall of the Soviet Union ===
On 1 November 1991, the 49th Tactical Fighter Wing adopted the Air Force Objective Organization plan and the 49th Tactical Fighter Group was re-designated as the 49th Operations Group and re-activated. The operational squadrons of the wing came under the control of the Operations Group. The 49th Operations Group was transferred the lineage, honors and history of the 49th Fighter Group.

The 7th Fighter Squadron, flying F-22s, was inactivated on 2 May 2014.

=== Lineage ===
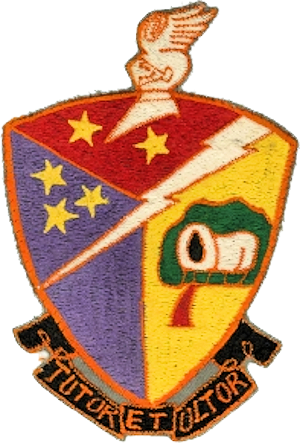
Emblem of the 49th Fighter Group

- Established as 49th Pursuit Group (Interceptor) on 20 November 1940

Activated on 15 January 1941
Re-designated: 49th Fighter Group on 15 May 1942
Re-designated: 49th Fighter Group, Single Engine, on 20 August 1943
Re-designated: 49th Fighter Group on 6 November 1944
Re-designated: 49th Fighter-Bomber Group on 1 February 1950
Inactivated on 10 December 1957

- Re-designated: 49th Tactical Fighter Group on 31 July 1985 (Remained Inactive)
- Re-designated: 49th Operations Group on 1 November 1991

Activated on 15 November 1991.

=== Assignments ===
- GHQ Air Force, 15 January 1941
- Third Air Force, 24 May 1941

Attached to III Interceptor Command, 9 August-1 October 1941

- III Interceptor Command, 2 October 1941
- Allied Air Forces, Southwest Pacific Area, February 1942
- Fifth Air Force, 10 October 1942
- V Fighter Command, 11 November 1942

Attached to: 310th Bombardment Wing, 1 February 1944–

- 85th Fighter Wing, 19 April 1944

Remained attached to: 310th Bombardment Wing until 1 May 1944
Attached to: 86th Fighter Wing, 1 May 1944–

- 308th Bombardment Wing, 5 June 1944

Remained attached to: 86th Fighter Wing entire time

- 86th Fighter Wing, 11 July 1944
- V Fighter Command, 11 August 1944

Remained attached to: 86th Fighter Wing entire time

- 309th Bombardment Wing, 21 August 1944

Remained attached to: 86th Fighter Wing entire time

- 86th Fighter Wing, 22 August 1944
- 308th Bombardment Wing, 26 September 1944

Remained attached to: 86th Fighter Wing entire time

- V Fighter Command, 8 December 1944

Remained attached to: 86th Fighter Wing until 9 January 1945
Attached to: 310th Bombardment Wing, 9 January – 29 May
Attached to: 309th Bombardment Wing, 29 May-25 September 1945
Attached to: 310th Bombardment Wing, 25 September-10 November 1945

- V Bomber Command, 10 November 1945
- 314th Composite Wing, 1 June 1946
- 49th Fighter (later, 49th Fighter-Bomber) Wing, 18 August 1948 – 10 December 1957

Attached to: 8th Fighter-Bomber Wing, 7 August-30 September 1950
Attached to: 6149th Tactical Support Wing, 1 October-30 November 1950
Attached to: 58th Fighter-Bomber Wing, 16–31 March 1953
Attached to: Japan Air Defense Force, 2 November 1953 – 31 August 1954
Attached to: Fifth Air Force, 1 September 1954 – 15 April 1957

- 49th Fighter (later 49th Wing), 15 November 1991–present

=== Components ===
- 6th Attack Squadron
- 7th Pursuit (later, Fighter; Fighter-Bomber; Fighter; Combat Training; Fighter) Squadron: 16 January 1941 – 10 December 1957; 15 November 1991 – 2 May 2014
- 8th Pursuit (later, Fighter; Fighter-Bomber; Fighter) Squadron: 16 January 1941 – 10 December 1957; 15 November 1991 – 2007; 25 September 2009 – 19 May 2011
- 9th Pursuit (later, Fighter; Fighter-Bomber; Fighter) Squadron: 16 January 1941 – 10 December 1957; 15 November 1991 – present
- 20th Fighter Squadron: 1 July 1993 – 20 December 2004
- 29th Attack Squadron: 23 October 2009 – present
- 48th Rescue Squadron: 1 May 1993 – 1 February 1999
- 415th Fighter Squadron: 8 July 1992 – 1 July 1993
- 416th Fighter Squadron: 8 July 1992 – 1 July 1993
- 417th Fighter Squadron: 8 July 1992 – 1 December 1993
- 433d Fighter Squadron: 15 November 1991 – 8 July 1992
- 435th Fighter Squadron: 12 May 1993 – 1 April 1997
- 491st Attack Squadron: 15 April 2019 – present
- 492d Attack Squadron: 15 April 2019 – present

=== Stations ===
- Selfridge Field, Michigan, 15 January 1941
- Morrison Field, Florida, c. 23 May 1941 – 5 January 1942
- Camp Darley (near Melbourne), Australia, 2 February 1942
- Bankstown Airfield, Australia, 16 February 1942
- Archerfield Airport, Australia, 7 April 1942
- RAAF Base Darwin, Australia, 17 April 1942
- Port Moresby Airfield Complex, New Guinea, 9 October 1942
- Dobodura Airfield Complex, New Guinea, March 1943
- Gusap Airfield, New Guinea, 20 November 1943
- Finschhafen Airfield, New Guinea, 19 April 1944
- Hollandia Airfield Complex, Netherlands East Indies, c. 17 May 1944
- Mokmer Airfield, Biak, Netherlands East Indies, 5 June 1944
- Tacloban Airfield, Leyte, Philippines, 24 October 1944
- McGuire Field, San Jose, Mindoro, Philippines, c. 30 December 1944
- Lingayen Airfield, Luzon, Philippines, c. 25 February 1945
- Kadena Airfield, Okinawa, 16 August 1945
- Atsugi Airfield, Japan, 15 September 1945
- Chitose Airfield, Japan, 18 February 1946
- Misawa AAB (later, AB), Japan, late March 1948
- Itazuke Air Base, Japan, 9 July 1950
- Taegu AB (K-2), South Korea, 1 October 1950
- Kunsan AB (K-8), South Korea, 1 April 1953
- Komaki Air Base, Japan, 2 November 1953
- Nagoya AB (later, Nagoya Air Stn; Moriyama Air Stn), Japan, 16 September 1954
- Misawa Air Base, Japan, 1 June-9 December 1957
- Étain-Rouvres Air Base, France, 10 December 1957
- Holloman AFB, New Mexico, 15 November 1991–present

=== Aircraft ===
- Seversky P-35, 1941
- P-40 Warhawk, 1941–1944
- P-47 Thunderbolt, 1943–1944
- P-38 Lightning, 1943, 1944–1946
- P-51 Mustang, 1946–1950
- F-80 Shooting Star, 1948–1951
- F-84 Thunderjet, 1951–1957
- F-86 Sabre, 1956–1957
- F-100 Super Sabre, 1957
- F-15 Eagle, 1991–1992
- F-4 Phantom II, 1992–2004
- F-117 Nighthawk, 1992–2007
- F-22 Raptor, 2007–2014
- MQ-1 Predator, 2009 – present
- MQ-9 Reaper, 2009 – present

== See also ==
- United States Army Air Forces in Australia
