= 7th Fighter Training Squadron =

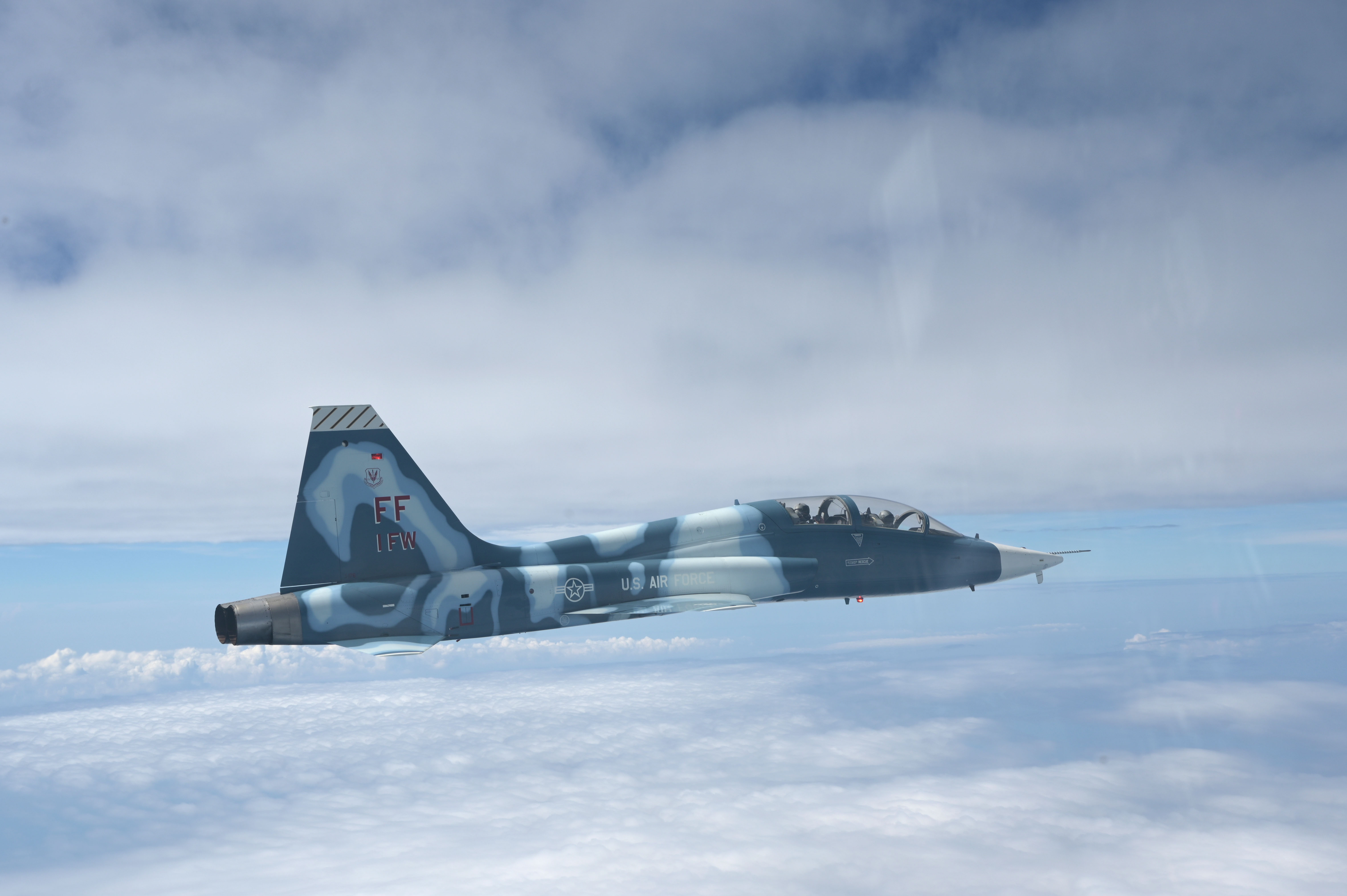
- 7th Fighter Squadron T-38 Talon in flight at Langley AFB (Note: Aircraft is in flight on 27 July 2022 for a local training mission.)
- Active: 1941–2006; 2008–2014; 2021–present
- Country: United States
- Branch: United States Air Force
- Type: Squadron
- Role: Fighter
- Part of: Air Combat Command
- Nickname: Screamin' Demons
- Engagements: World War II (Asia-Pacific Theater) Korean War Vietnam War 1991 Gulf War (Defense of Saudi Arabia; Liberation of Kuwait) Operation Southern Watch

- Decorations: Distinguished Unit Citation (7x) Air Force Outstanding Unit Award with Combat "V" Device Air Force Outstanding Unit Award (6x) Philippine Presidential Unit Citation Republic of Korea Presidential Unit Citation (2x) Republic of Vietnam Gallantry Cross with Palm

Insignia
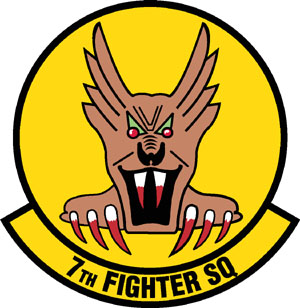
- 7th Fighter Squadron emblem (Note: The squadron's emblem is described as a "Bunyap, an Australian aboriginal death demon". "7th Fighter Squadron History". 7th Fighter Squadron Reunion Organization. The usual spelling is Bunyip. "Bunyips ... enter the lair of the bunyip if you dare". National Library of Australia. Archived from the original on 22 October 2008.. The emblem was modified prior to 1995 to bring all elements within the disc and change the black annulet to a border. Compare Maurer, Combat Squadrons, pp. 43–44 ("Over and through a yellow disc, charged with an annulet black . . .") with Endicott, p. 383 ("On a yellow disc edged with a black border . . . "))

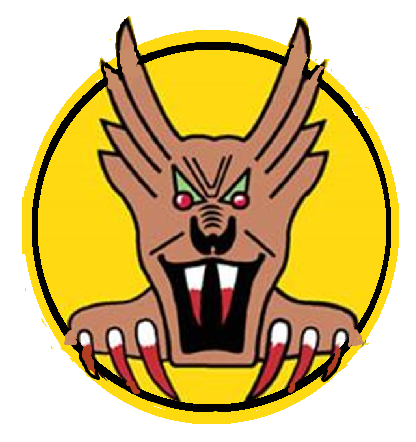
- 7th Fighter Squadron emblem (Note: Approved 13 May 1944.)

The 7th Fighter Training Squadron is an active United States Air Force unit, assigned to the 1st Operations Group. It is stationed at Langley Air Force Base, Virginia.

== Overview ==
The 7th Fighter Squadron is an active United States Air Force unit, assigned to the 1st Operations Group. The unit was reactivated on 12 November 2021. It is stationed at Langley Air Force Base, Virginia. The 7th FTS received personnel and equipment transferred from the 71st Fighter Training Squadron at JBLE. The 7th FTS assumed the adversary air mission, which utilizes T-38 Talons to help prepare F-22 Raptor pilots for real-world combat scenarios. The 7th FTS has a long, rich tradition that dates back to World War II, when the squadron flew P-40 Warhawk, P-47 Thunderbolt, and P-38 Lightning air defense missions in Australia and New Guinea. The 7th FTS mascot and emblem, the 'Screamin' Demons', was derived from the Australian Aboriginal's death demon, the 'Bunyap'.

== History ==
=== World War II ===
The 7th Fighter Squadron origins date to 16 January 1941, when it was activated as Selfridge Field, Michigan as the 7th Pursuit Squadron. It was equipped with Seversky P-35s that were transferred from the 1st Pursuit Group that left Selfridge for Rockwell Field, California. In May 1941, the squadron proceeded to Morrison Field, West Palm Beach, Florida, to train in the Curtiss P-40 Warhawk fighter.

After the Japanese attack on Pearl Harbor, training was greatly accelerated to prepare the squadron for combat duty. By 16 February 1942, the 7th found itself at Bankstown Airfield, Sydney, Australia, as one of the first American aviation units in the Southwest Pacific, flying the Warhawk. The squadron's first combat action with the Japanese happened on 14 March over Horn Island, Queensland off the Cape York Peninsula, Australia, with the 7th downing 5 Japanese A6M Zeroes, taking no losses themselves. Until September 1942, the 7th would remain in Australia, engaged primarily in air defense. The 7th moved to join the other 2 squadrons of the 49th Pursuit Group, in the defense of Darwin, Northern Territory, in April 1942.

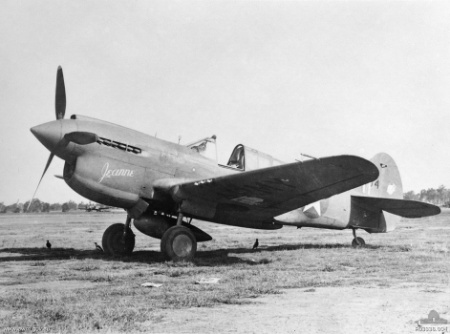
7th Fighter Squadron P-40E in Australia, March 1942

It then moved North to Schwimmer Airfield, Port Moresby, New Guinea, where its P-40s flew attack and air defense missions against Japanese fortifications. During this period, the squadron, known as the "Screamin' Demons," adopted their mascot and emblem, the Bunyap, an Australian aboriginal death demon. Even to this day, the Bunyap remains the squadron emblem.

During World War II, the 7th had 10 of its members earn ace status, as each of them destroyed 5 or more enemy aircraft in aerial combat. The squadron continued to function effectively during WW II scoring 36 "Kills" in December 1944. By the end of the war, the Screamin' Demons had achieved 178 "Kills."

The squadron participated in the Allied offensive that pushed the Japanese back along the Kokoda Track, took part in the Battle of the Bismarck Sea in March 1943, fought for control of the approaches to Huon Gulf, and supported ground forces during the campaign in which the Allies eventually recovered New Guinea. It covered the landings on Noemfoor and had a part in. the conquest of Biak.

After having used Lockheed P-38 Lightnings, P-40 Warhawks and Republic P-47 Thunderbolts, the squadron was equipped completely in September 1944 with P-38's, which were used to fly long-range escort and attack missions to Mindanao, Halmahera, Seram, and Borneo. The unit arrived in the Philippines in October 1944, shortly after the assault landings on Leyte and engaged enemy fighters, attacked shipping in Ormoc Bay, supported ground forces, and covered the Allied invasion of Luzon. For or intensive operations against the Japanese on Leyte, the group was awarded a Distinguished Unit Citation.

Other missions from the Philippines included strikes against industry and transportation on Taiwan and against shipping along the China coast. The end of the war in August 1945 found the 7th Fighter Squadron on Okinawa, preparing for Operation Downfall, the planned invasion of Japan, in November.

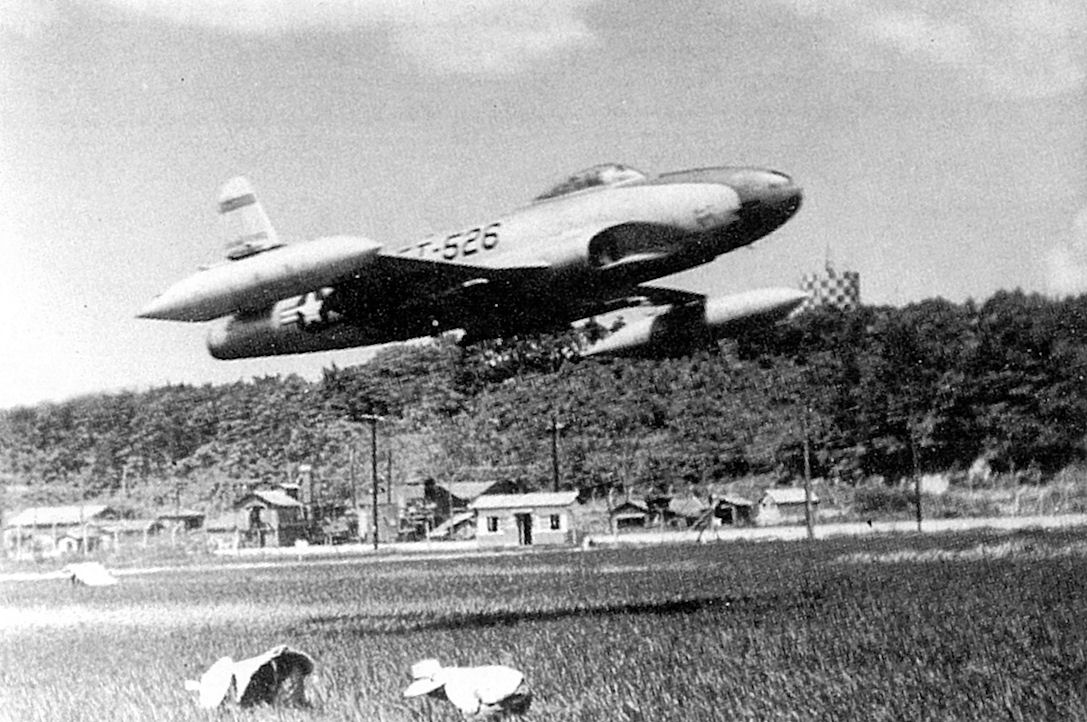
7th Fighter-Bomber Squadron F-80C taking off from Itazuke AB (Note: Aircraft is Lockheed F-80C Shooting Star, serial 49-526, on 14 August 1950.)

After VJ Day, the squadron moved to the Japanese Home Islands, initially at the former Imperial Japanese Navy Atsugi Airfield, near Tokyo on 15 September 1945. Its war-weary P-38 Lightnings were sent back to the United States and the squadron was re-equipped with North American P-51D Mustangs with a mission of both occupation duty and show of force flights. In February 1946, the squadron was moved to Chitose Air Base, on northern Honshu and assumed an air defense mission over Honshu and also Hokkaido Island. The pilots of the squadron were briefed not to allow any Soviet Air Force aircraft over Japanese airspace, as there was tension between the United States and the Soviet Union about Soviet occupation forces landing on Hokkaido. In April 1948, the squadron moved to the newly rebuilt Misawa Air Base when the host 49th Fighter Group took up home station responsibilities. At Misawa, the squadron moved into the jet age when it was re-equipped with the Lockheed F-80C Shooting Star.

=== Korean War ===
With the outbreak of the Korean War in June 1950, the 7th was one of the first USAF squadrons dispatched to Korea from Japan, initially operating propeller-driven F-51Ds to cover the evacuation of civilians from Kimpo and Suwon. Next, it flew close air support missions to help slow the advancing North Korean armies. Later, it turned to the interdiction of enemy troops, supplies and communications from Misawa. However its short-range F-80Cs meant that the 49th had to move to South Korea in order for them to be effective.

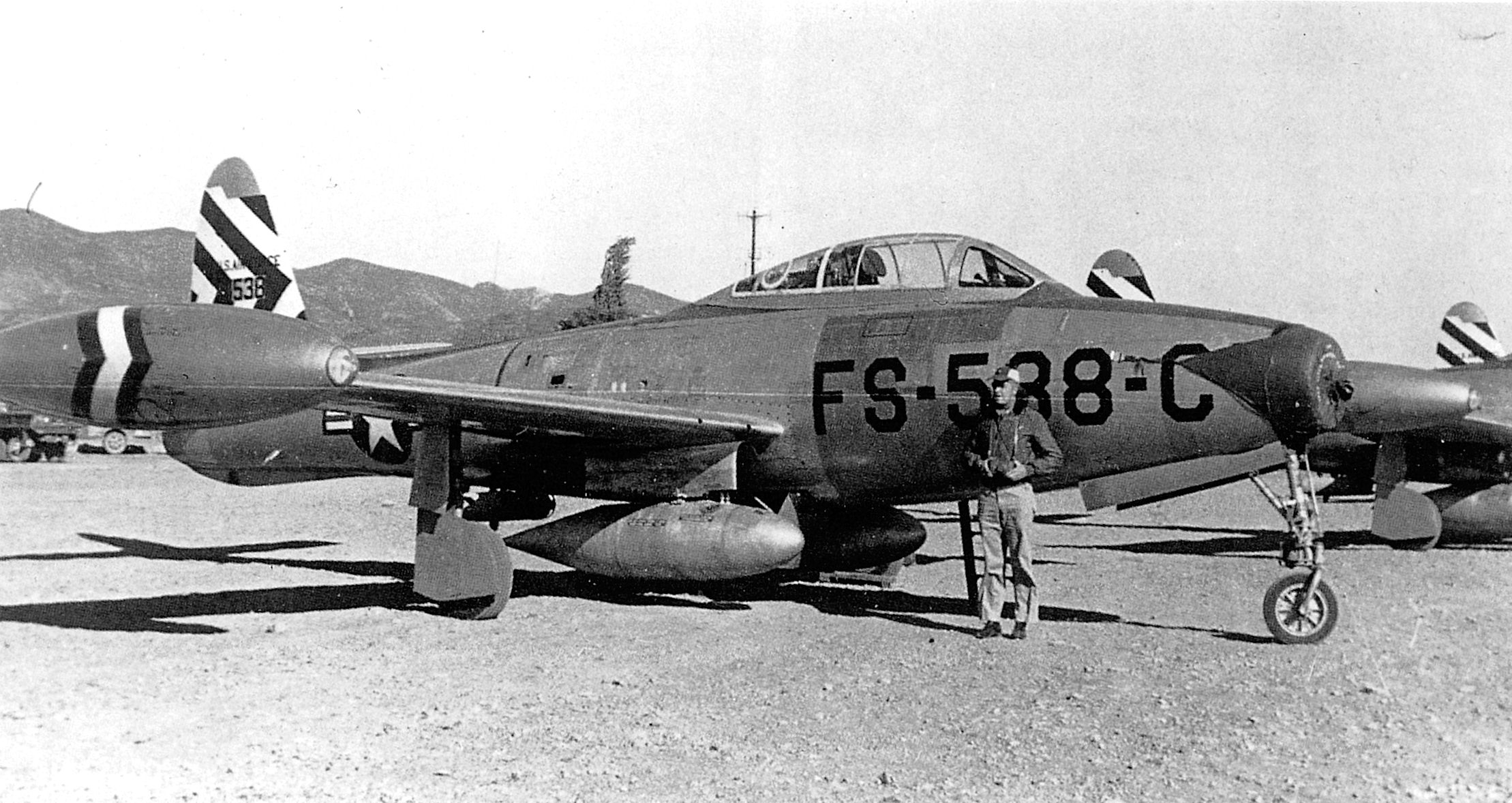
7th Fighter-Bomber Squadron F-84G Thunderjet (Note: Aircraft is Republic F-84G Thunderjet, serial 51-10538 "Damn Yankee" at Pohangdong AB (K-3), South Korea, equipped with wing pylon fuel tanks and JATO bottles.)

The squadron moved to Taegu Air Base (K-2) on 1 October 1950, becoming the first jet fighter outfit to operate from a base in South Korea. During the autumn of 1950 and spring of 1951, the squadron flew combat missions on a daily basis from Tageu, flying escort missions for Boeing B-29 Superfortresses over North Korea and engaging Communist Mikoyan-Gurevich MiG-15 fighters in air-to-air combat. When the Chinese Communist Forces Intervention Campaign gained momentum in 1950–1951, the squadron again concentrated on the ground support mission, attacking Communist Chinese ground units in North Korea, moving south until the line was stabilized and held just south of Seoul.

The 49th changed equipment to the Republic F-84G Thunderjet in mid-1951, It engaged Communist forces on the ground in support of the 1st UN Counteroffensive Campaign (1951). Afterwards, it engaged primarily in air interdiction operations against the main enemy channel of transportation, the roads and railroads between Pyongyang and Sinuiju. Also, it flew close air support missions for the ground forces and attacked high-value targets, including the Sui-ho hydroelectric plants in June 1952 and the Kumgang Political School in October 1952. On 27 July 1953, the squadron joined with the 58th Fighter-Bomber Group to bomb Sunan Airfield for the final action of F-84 fighter-bombers during the Korean War.

The wing remained in Korea for a time after the armistice. It moved to Japan in November 1953 and returned to its air defense mission. The squadron upgraded to the North American F-86F Sabre in 1956. By late 1957, however, Worldwide DOD Budget restrictions during FY 1958 meant that the fighter wing atChitose would be eliminated as part of a reduction of the USAF units based in Japan.

=== United States Air Forces in Europe ===
Due to its seniority, the 49th Fighter-Bomber Wing was not inactivated with Chitose's closure, but replaced the 388th Fighter-Bomber Wing at Étain-Rouvres Air Base, France on 10 December 1957 in a name-only transfer. The 7th assumed the aircraft, personnel and equipment of the 561st Fighter-Bomber Squadron which was inactivated. As the 49th had been a part of American forces in the Pacific since it was sent to Australia in January 1942, the assignment to Europe after fifteen years in the Pacific was a major change for the organization.

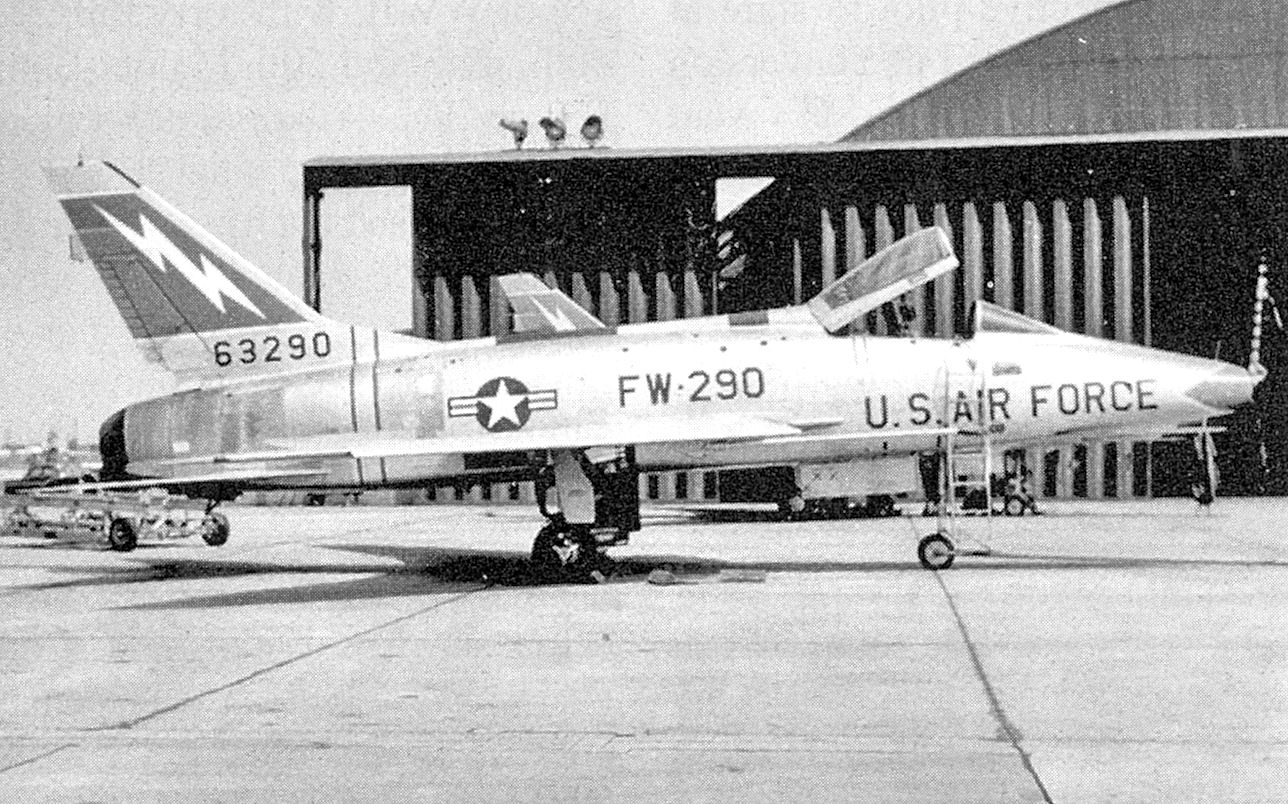
F-100D Super Sabre 56-3290, 7th Tactical Fighter Squadron, Etain-Rouvres Air Base, 1958

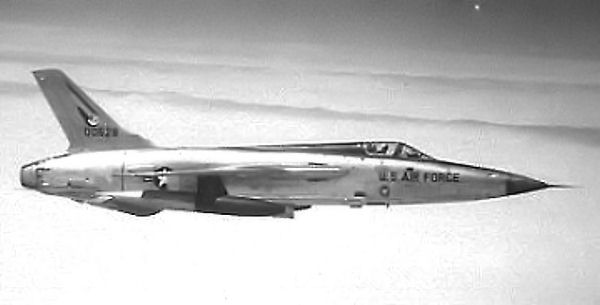
Republic F-105D, 49th Tactical Fighter Wing

Taking over the seven North American F-100D Super Sabres and three dual-seat F-100F trainers of the 561st, the squadron continued its normal peacetime training. The squadron began keeping four of its planes on 15-minute alert (Victor Alert) on 1 February 1958 so a portion of the squadron could react quickly in an emergency. During the fall of 1958, most of the squadron operated from Chalon-Vatry Air Base while the runway at Etain was being repaired and resurfaced.

However, the nuclear-capable F-100 was troublesome to the host French Government, the French decreed that all United States nuclear weapons and delivery aircraft had to be removed from French soil by July 1958. As a result, the F-100s of the 49th Wing had to be removed from France. After negotiations with the French, the 49th's Wing commander was informed that the wing would be departing from France on 1 July 1959 and be moved to Spangdahlem Air Base, West Germany. During the relocation to West Germany, the squadron deployed to Wheelus Air Base, Libya, for gunnery training. However, not all squadron personnel moved to Spangdahlem, as many of the 10th Tactical Reconnaissance Wing personnel there were almost at the end of their tours and did not want to move to RAF Alconbury, where the 10th was being relocated to in order to accommodate the 49th. As a result, some squadron ground support personnel instead moved to RAF Lakenheath, England to backfill vacancies there, while the 10th Wing personnel at Spandahlem were allowed to finish out their assignments.

At Spangdahlem, the squadron flew F-100s until 1961 when it converted to the Republic F-105 Thunderchief, commonly known as the "Thud". The 49th Wing was only the third USAF unit to operate the F-105. As part of United States Air Forces Europe (USAFE), the 7th participated in many NATO exercises. In February 1967, the 7th opened the 49th weapons training detachment at Wheelus Air Base to begin transition to the McDonnell F-4D Phantom II, and received its first F-4D on 9 March 1967.

In the late 1960s, the defense budget began to be squeezed by the costs of the ongoing Vietnam War. Secretary of Defense Robert MacNamara decided to reduce costs in Europe by "Dual Basing" United States military units in Europe by returning them permanently to the United States, and conducting annual deployment exercises in Europe, giving the units a NATO commitment for deployment to bases in Europe if tensions with the Soviet Union warranted an immediate military buildup. The 49th Tactical Fighter Wing returned to the United States under this policy, moving on 1 July 1968 to Holloman Air Force Base, New Mexico, to serve as the US Air Force's first dual-based, NATO-committed wing.

=== Holloman Air Force Base ===
At Holloman, the squadron participated in Tactical Air Command (TAC) tactical exercises and firepower demonstrations to maintain combat readiness. Also, the first "Tail Codes" to identify squadron aircraft were applied, rather than the traditional blue color of the 7th which had been used since the Korean War. Initially "HB" was the tail code identifier for the 7th, however, in 1972, Air Force Manual 66-1 specified wing tail codes and the squadron's planes were standardized on the 49th's "HO" tail code. However, a blue tail stripe was applied to identify squadron aircraft.

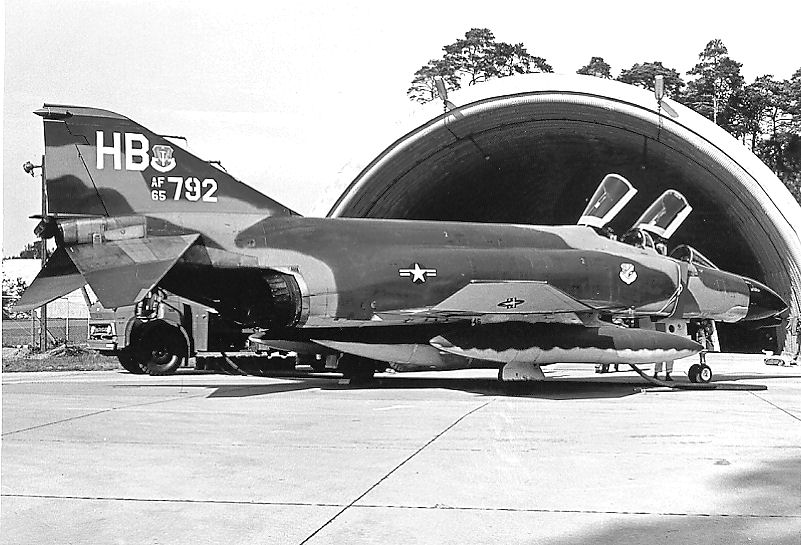
7th Tactical Fighter Squadron F-4D Phantom at Spangdahlem AB during an annual "Crested Cap" deployment (Note: Aircraft is McDonnell F-4D-29-MC Phantom II, serial 65-792, in September 1970.)

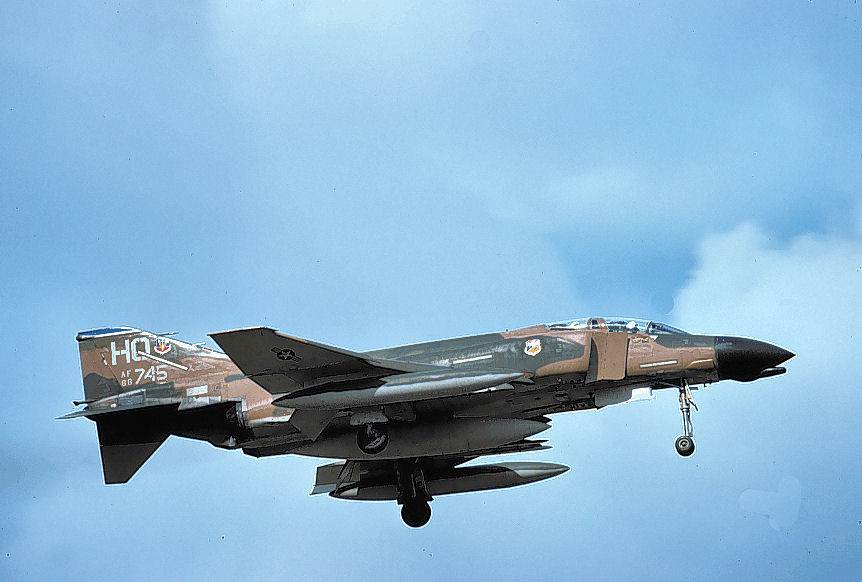
7th Squadron F-4D Phantom after the changeover to the "HO" tail code in 1975 (Note: Aircraft is McDonnell F-4D-31-MC Phantom II, serial 66-7745.)

The 7th also retained its NATO commitment to return once a year to its "dual base" home in West Germany. These deployments were known as "Crested Cap", and were as follows:

- F-4 deployments:

Spangdahlem Air Base, West Germany, 12 September-7 October 1970; Ramstein Air Base, West Germany, 9 September-6 October 1971; Bitburg Air Base, West Germany, 2 March-2 April 1973; 2 April-3 May 1974; 2 October-6 November 1975; Ramstein Air Base, West Germany, 24 August-25 September 1976

- CFB Lahr, West Germany, 24 August-16 September 1981 (F-15A)
- F-15 deployments:

Canadian Forces Base Lahr, West Germany, 26 August-25 September 1983; Gilze-Rijen Air Base, Netherlands, 27 May-24 June 1986, 12 June-9 July 1990

With the end of the Cold War and subsequent force drawdowns by USAFE, these annual exercises ended in 1991.

==== Operation Constant Guard III ====
On 4 May 1972, after North Vietnam invaded South Vietnam, the entire wing, except for a rear echelon that remained to run Holloman, deployed at Takhli Royal Thai Air Force Base, Thailand. Operation Constant Guard III, ordered in response to the North Vietnamese invasion, was the largest movement that TAC had ever performed. In nine days, the squadron deployed its F-4D Phantom IIs from Holloman to Takhli. Airmen arriving reported that Takhli was a mess, with missing or broken plumbing fixtures, no hot water, and no drinking water – that had to be trucked in from Korat every day. Bed frames had been thrown out of the hootches into the high snake-infested grass, and mattresses or bedding consisted of sleeping bags at best.

The 7th flew combat sorties in South Vietnam, Cambodia, and Laos from 1 July to 24 September 1972 during Operation Linebacker, the bombardment campaign in North Vietnam. During this deployment, the squadron flew over just about every battle zone from An Loc to vital installations in the Hanoi vicinity. During five months of combat, the squadron did not lose any aircraft or personnel. The unit closed out its Southwest Asia duty 6 October 1972.

==== F-15A Eagle era ====
In October 1977, the 49th Wing ended its "dual-base" commitment to NATO and changed to an air superiority mission with the wing beginning a conversion from the F-4D Phantom II to the McDonnell Douglas F-15A Eagle; the 49th being the second USAF operational wing to receive the F-15A. The transition was completed 4 June 1978.

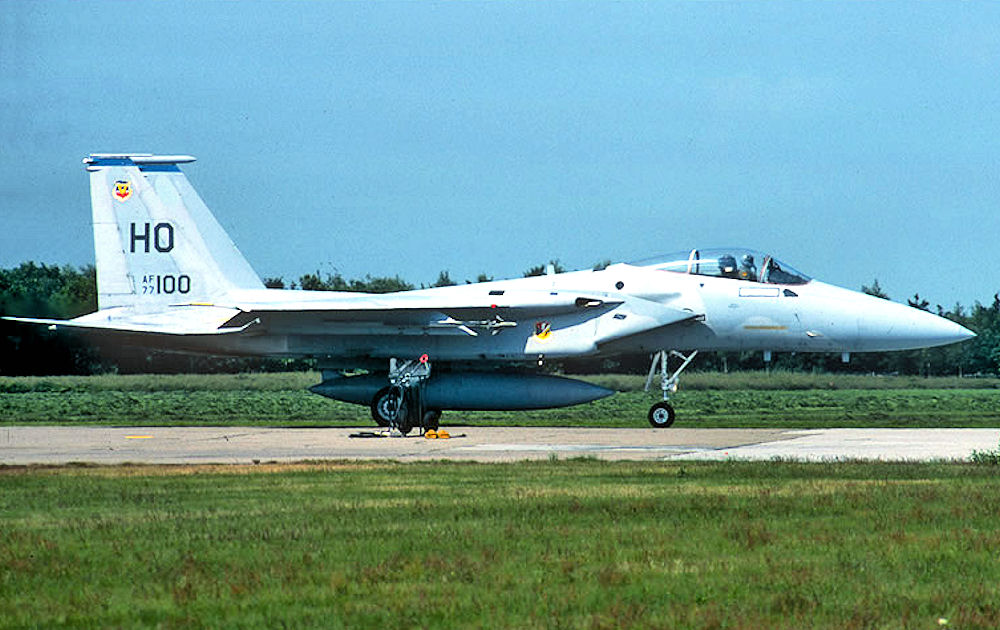
7th Tactical Fighter Squadron F-15A, about 1980 (Note: Aircraft is McDonnell Douglas F-15A-19-MC Eagle, serial 77-100.)

Due to the change in equipment, the annual NATO deployments were taken over by the 4th Tactical Fighter Wing at Seymour Johnson Air Force Base, North Carolina in 1978. However, they resumed (although not on an annual basis) in 1981. In the United States, training missions were refocused on dissimilar air combat tactics for multi-theater operations, participating in numerous Red Flag Exercises, joint training exercises, and deployments in the air defense/superiority mission. Frequent deployments were made to Nellis Air Force Base, Nevada to exercise with the Northrop F-5E Tiger II "Aggressor" aircraft of the 57th Fighter Weapons Wing, and other aircraft types (including clandestine exercises with Soviet aircraft flown by the 4477th Test and Evaluation Squadron at Tonopah Test Range Airport, Nevada). Also, after TAC absorbed the interceptor mission of Aerospace Defense Command in 1979, the squadron maintained the TAC NORAD air defense alert commitment in the Eagle, with the best scramble times in NORAD.

On 12 October 1989, the squadron was called into action once again. Several F-15A aircraft deployed to Howard Air Force Base, Panama in support of Operation Just Cause. The purpose of this deployment was to support President George H.W. Bush's national drug control strategy. During this operation, General Manuel Noriega surrendered and was transported back to Homestead Air Force Base, Florida where he was arraigned on federal drug trafficking charges. No combat sorties however, were flown in support of the removal of Noriega and the squadron returned to Holloman by the end of October.

With the introduction of the F-15C Eagle in the mid-1980s, the upgraded Eagle began replacing the F-15A/Bs in service with all of the USAF units that had previously been operating the Eagle with the exception of the 49th Wing. By the time of Operation Desert Storm in 1991, the F-15A Eagles at Holloman had been relegated to a training role; combat deployments of the Eagle were the purview of F-15C units.

==== F-117 Nighthawk era ====
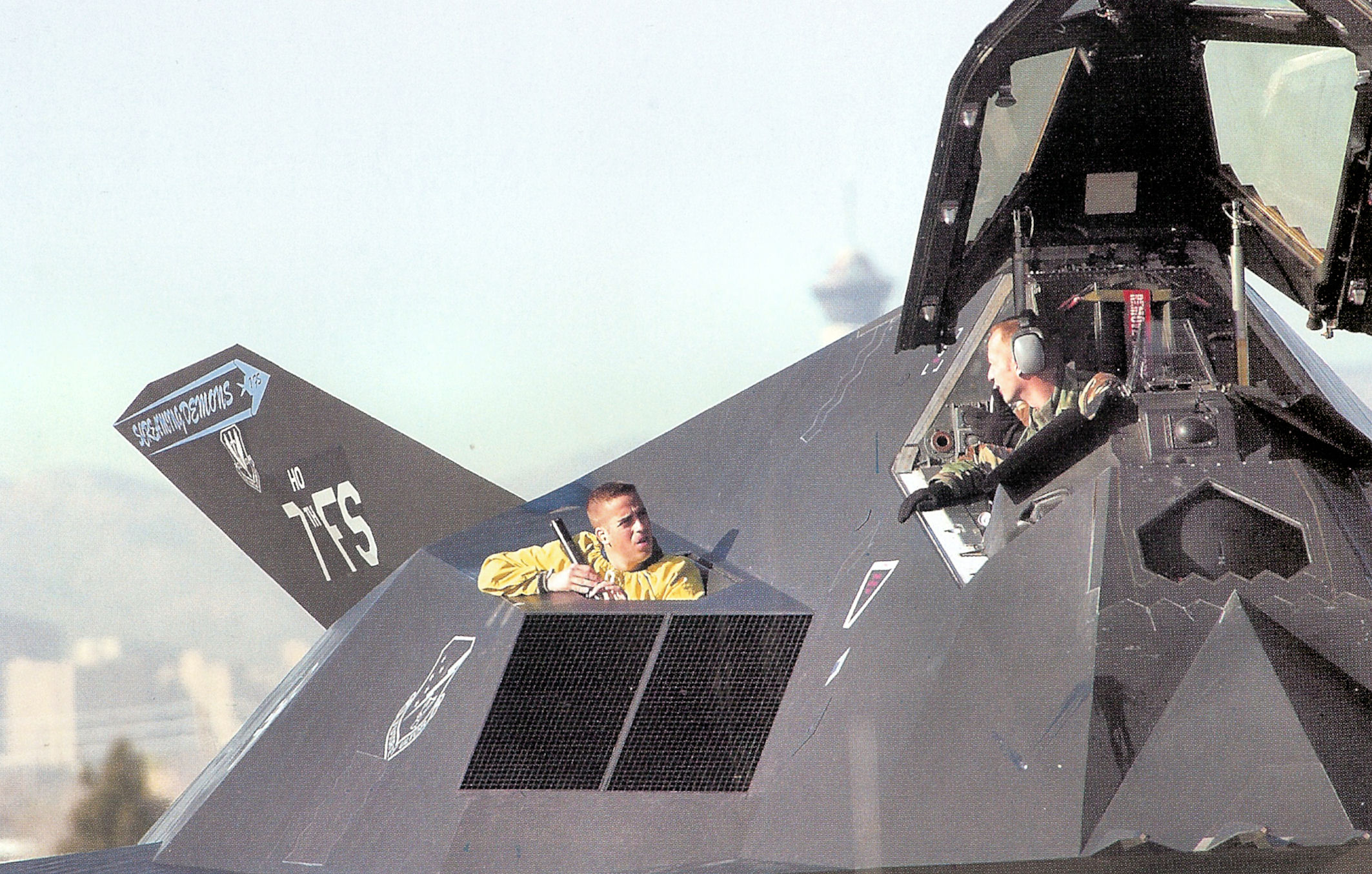
7th Fighter Squadron F-117A crew chiefs prepare an aircraft for flight at Holloman AFB

In 1992, the 49th Wing underwent a number of transitions. As a result of the end of the Cold War, reduced defense budgets were the order of the day. As a result, the 7th Fighter Squadron retired its F-15A Eagles and received the Lockheed F-117A Nighthawk stealth fighters and personnel of the 37th Fighter Wing's 415th Fighter Squadron, which was inactivated.

After conversion to the F-117A in May 1992, The 7th deployed fighters and their crews to Southwest Asia during the 1990s as part of Operation Southern Watch to support United Nations weapons inspectors in Iraq, to enforce the no-fly zone over the southern part of that country to deprive Saddam Hussein of his Weapons of Mass Destruction programs and to force his compliance with the UN monitoring regime. 7th F-117s fighters deployed to the Gulf in 1998 during Operation Desert Fox to upgrade the strike force's capability to attack high-value targets. But the 18-hour flight from Holloman AFB to Kuwait meant that the operation was over before the F-117 aircraft arrived in the Gulf.

In June 1999 the 7th took over the pilot transition training mission to the F-117A and the Northrop AT-38 Talon trainers, being redesignated as the 7th Combat Training Squadron. The 7th became the mainstay of developing combat capability for the F-117, with its T-38s providing both transition training as well as dissimilar air combat training as "aggressors" against the Nighthawk. The training mission with the stealth fighters continued until 2005 when it was announced by the Air Force that the Nighthawk would be retired in favor of the Lockheed Martin F-22A Raptor stealth superiority fighter. The 7th was inactivated on 15 December 2006 after 65 continuous years of active duty.

==== F-22A Raptor era ====
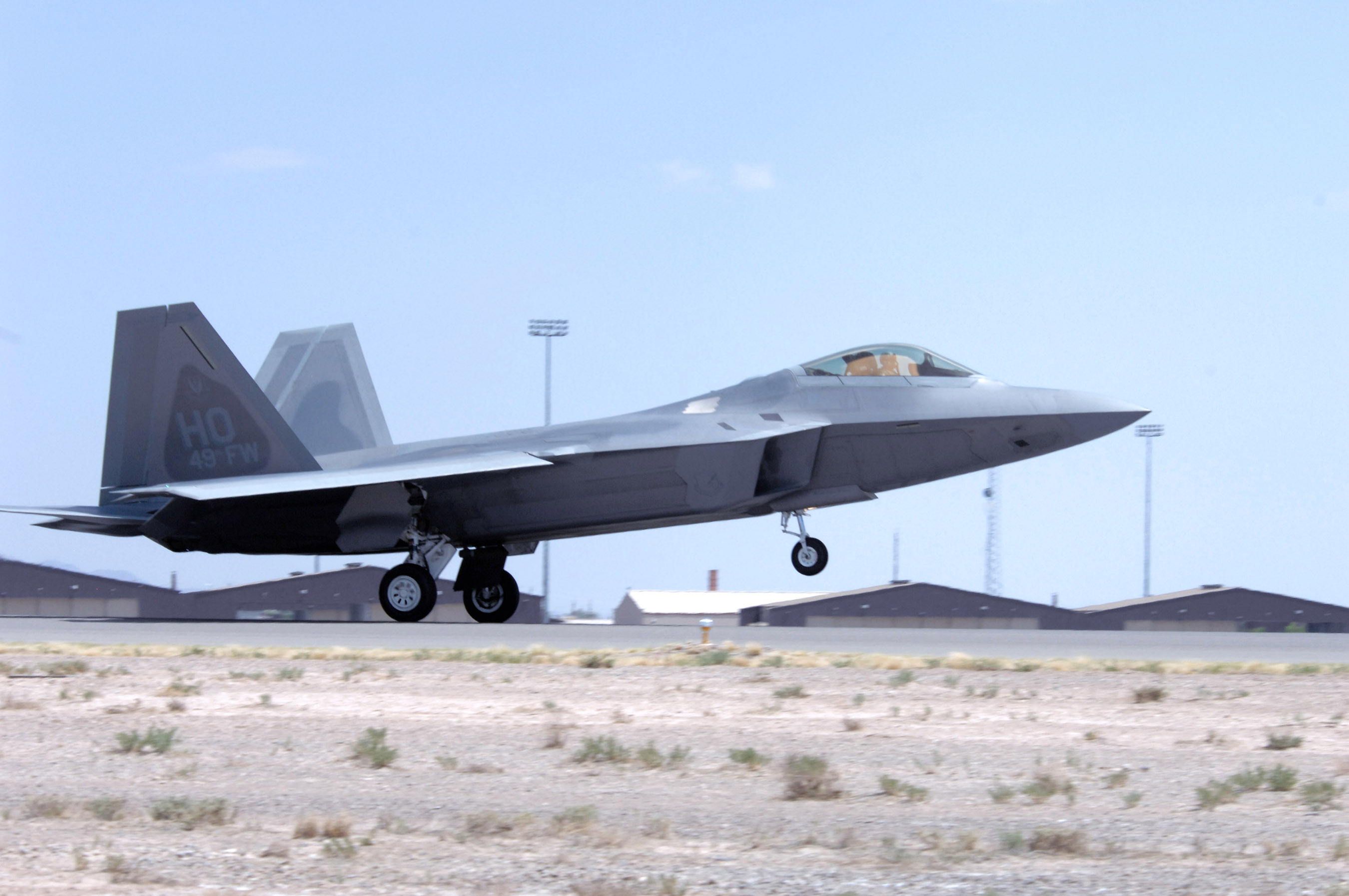
First 7th Fighter Squadron F-22A Raptor arriving at Holloman AFB on 2 June 2008

The inactivation of the 7th, however, was brief as it was reactivated on 15 May 2008 as the 7th Fighter Squadron, and equipped with the Lockheed Martin F-22A Raptor. The 7th was the first of two F-22 squadrons to be activated at Holloman. The squadron was equipped with 18 F-22s transferred from the 3rd Wing at Elmendorf Air Force Base, Alaska, the last aircraft being received in late 2009.

After its reactivation, the 7th Fighter Squadron deployed frequently to overseas locations in support of United States objectives. The 7th Fighter Squadron, better known as the "Screamin' Demons", maintained combat readiness to deploy worldwide in accordance with Secretary of Defense taskings. Operating the F-22A Raptor, the squadron provided air dominance in the world's most dangerous threat arenas.

In 2012, it was announced that the 7th Fighter Squadron was to move its support personnel and aircraft to Tyndall Air Force Base, Florida, in the spring of 2013 to comply with the Air Force's F-22 fleet consolidation plan. In return, the squadron was to receive General Dynamics F-16 Fighting Falcon aircraft from Luke Air Force Base, Arizona as part of a training restructuring plan to move the F-16 Training School from Luke to Holloman. Luke AFB is scheduled to begin the Lockheed Martin F-35A Lightning II training mission in October 2005. In August 2013, it was announced however, that the United States Congress enacted a freeze on U.S. Air Force structure changes, including aircraft transfers. These moves were reviewed and in April 2014 the last of the F-22s were sent to Tyndall. The squadron was inactivated a month later, on 2 May.

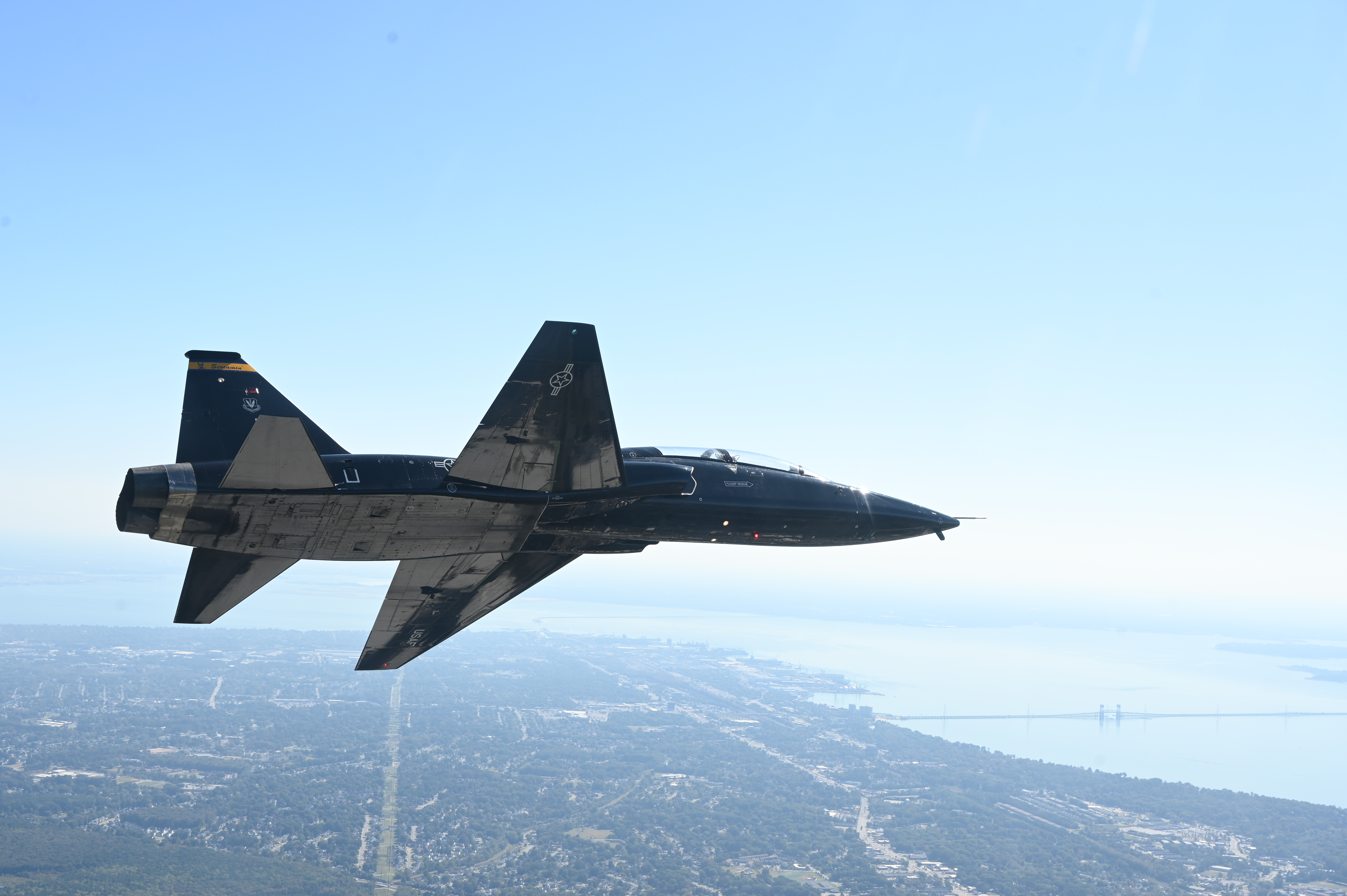
JOINT BASE LANGLEY-EUSTIS, Va - A T-38 Talon from the 7th Fighter Training Squadron pitches out left during the Battle of Britain Commemoration held by the 1st Fighter Wing at Joint Base Langley-Eustis, Virginia, Oct. 21, 2022. The commemoration consisted of a brief with historical context, assigning crew members with call signs related to key battle participants and flight operations similar to the time of the battle. (U.S. Air Force photo by Tech. Sgt. Matthew Coleman-Foster)

==== T-38 Talon era ====
Currently, the 7th FTS is equipped with the Northrop T-38 Talon.

The squadron was redesignated the 7th Fighter Training Squadron and activated in November 2021 at Langley Air Force Base, Virginia, assigned to the 1st Operations Group.

== Lineage ==
- Constituted as the 7th Pursuit Squadron (Interceptor) on 20 November 1940

Activated on 15 January 1941
Redesignated 7th Fighter Squadron on 15 May 1942
Redesignated 7th Fighter Squadron, Single Engine on 20 August 1943
Redesignated 7th Fighter Squadron, Two Engine on 6 November 1944
Redesignated 7th Fighter Squadron, Single Engine on 8 January 1946
Redesignated 7th Fighter Squadron, Jet-Propelled on 1 May 1948
Redesignated 7th Fighter Squadron, Jet on 10 August 1948
Redesignated 7th Fighter-Bomber Squadron on 1 February 1950
Redesignated 7th Tactical Fighter Squadron on 8 July 1958
Redesignated 7th Fighter Squadron on 1 November 1991
Redesignated 7th Combat Training Squadron on 17 June 1999
Redesignated 7th Fighter Squadron on 22 July 2005
Inactivated on 15 December 2006

- Activated on 15 May 2008

Inactivated 2 May 2014

- Redesignated 7th Fighter Training Squadron on 7 September 2021

Activated on 12 November 2021

=== Assignments ===
- 49th Pursuit Group (later 49th Fighter Group, 49th Fighter-Bomber Group), 15 January 1941

Attached to 49th Fighter-Bomber Wing, 9 July – 17 August 1950 and 7 August 1956 – 15 April 1957; 4th Fighter-Day Wing, 15 April – 10 December 1957

- 49th Fighter-Bomber Wing (later 49th Tactical Fighter Wing, 49 Fighter Wing), 10 December 1957

Attached to 26th Tactical Reconnaissance Wing, 10 September – 6 October 1971, 86th Tactical Fighter Wing, 2 March – 4 April 1973 and 23 August – 25 September 1976, 36th Tactical Fighter Wing, 2 April – 3 May 1974 and 4 October – 6 November 1975

- 49th Operations Group, 15 November 1991 – 15 December 2006
- 49th Operations Group, 15 May 2008 – 2 May 2014
- 1st Operations Group, 12 November 2021 – present

=== Stations ===
- Selfridge Field, Michigan, 15 January 1941
- Morrison Field, Florida, c. 23 May 1941 – 4 January 1942
- Essendon Airport, Melbourne, Australia, 2 February 1942
- Bankstown Airfield, Australia, 16 February 1942
- Batchelor Airfield, Australia, 9 April 1942
- Schwimmer Airfield (14 Mile Drome), Port Moresby, New Guinea, 19 September 1942
- Dobodura Airfield Complex, New Guinea, 15 April 1943
- Gusap Airfield, New Guinea, 16 November 1943
- Finschhafen Airfield, New Guinea, 27 April 1944
- Hollandia Airfield Complex, New Guinea, 3 May 1944
- Mokmer Airfield, Biak, Netherlands East Indies, 5 June 1944
- Tacloban Airfield, Leyte, Philippines, 24 October 1944
- McGuire Field, Mindoro, Philippines, 30 December 1944
- Lingayen Airfield, Luzon, Philippines, c. 25 February 1945
- Kadena Field, Okinawa Island, 17 August 1945
- Atsugi Airfield, Japan, 15 September 1945
- Chitose Air Base, Japan, c. 20 February 1946
- Misawa Air Base, Japan, 2 April 1948
- Itazuke Air Base, Japan, 14 August 1950
- Taegu Air Base (K-2), South Korea, 28 September 1950
- Kunsan Air Base (K-8), South Korea, 1 April 1953
- Itazuke Air Base, Japan, 2 November 1953
- Misawa Air Base, Japan, 7 August 1956
- Chitose Air Base, Japan, 1 July-10 December 1957
- Étain-Rouvres Air Base (later Etain Air Base, France, 10 December 1957
- Spangdahlem Air Base, West Germany, 25 August 1959 – 15 July 1968
- Holloman Air Force Base, New Mexico, 15 July 1968 – 15 December 2006

Deployed to Ramstein Air Base, West Germany, 10 September-6 October 1971, 2 March-4 April 1973 and 23 August-25 September 1976; Takhli Royal Thai Air Force Base, Thailand, 11 May-12 August 1972; Bitburg Air Base, West Germany, 2 April-3 May 1974 and 4 October-6 November 1975

- Holloman Air Force Base, New Mexico, 15 May 2008 – 2 May 2014
- Langley Air Force Base, Virginia, 12 November 2021 – present

=== Aircraft ===
- Seversky P-35, 1941
- Curtiss P-40 Warhawk, 1942–1944
- Republic P-47D Thunderbolt, 1943–1944
- Lockheed P-38 Lightning, 1944–1946
- North American P-51D Mustang, 1946–1949
- Lockheed F-80C Shooting Star, 1949–1951
- Republic F-84G Thunderjet, 1951–1956
- North American F-86F Sabre, 1956–1957
- North American F-100D Super Sabre, 1957–1962
- Republic F-105 Thunderchief, 1962–1966
- McDonnell F-4D Phantom II, 1967–1977
- McDonnell Douglas F-15A Eagle, 1977–1993
- McDonnell Douglas F-15B Eagle, 1977–1993
- Lockheed F-117A Nighthawk, 1993–2008
- Northrop AT-38 Talon, 1999–2008
- Lockheed Martin F-22A Raptor, 2008–2014
