= 29th Attack Squadron =

29th Attack Squadron

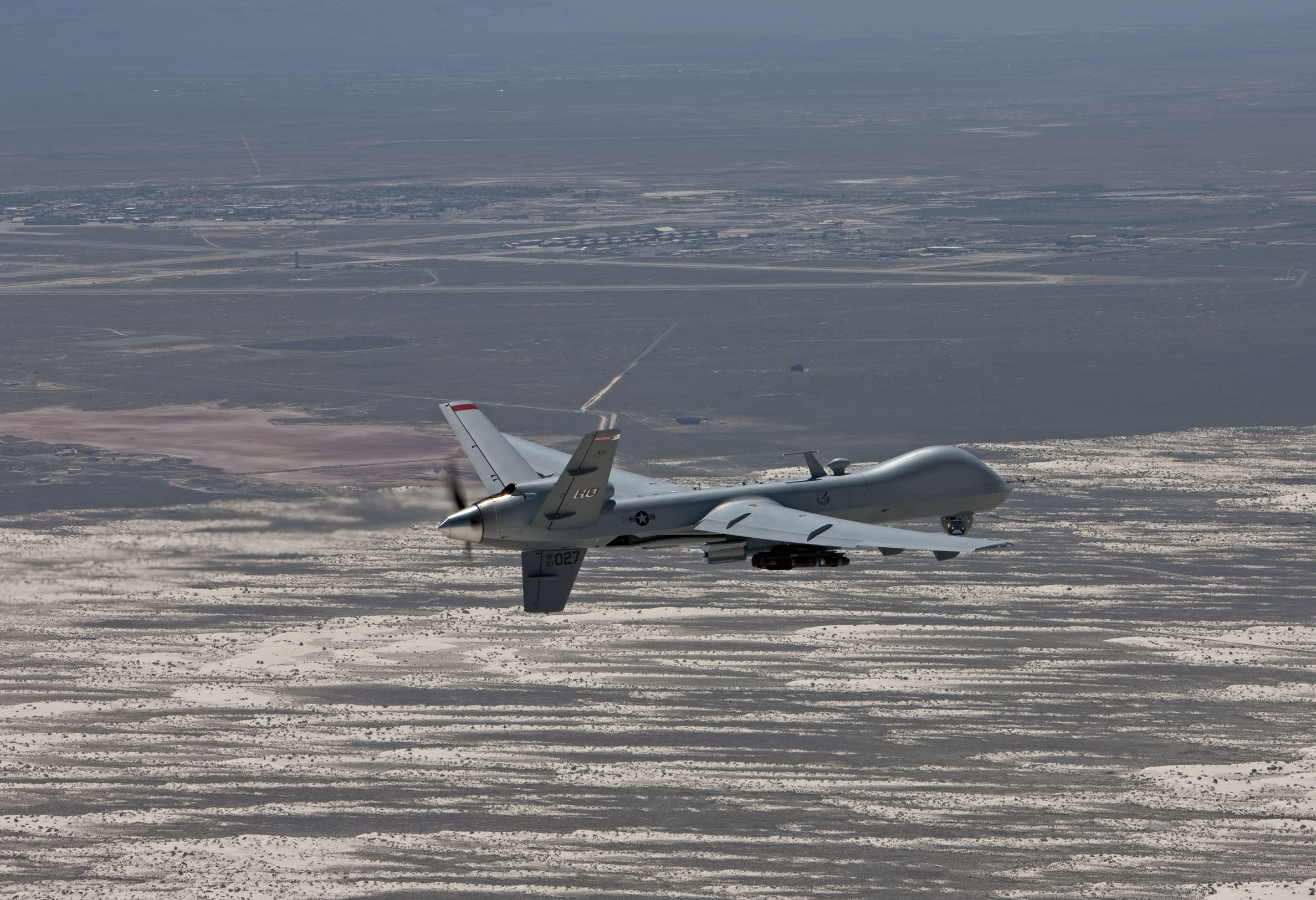
- MQ-9 Reaper inflight over Holloman AFB
- Active: 1942–1946; 1954–1971; 2009–present
- Country: United States
- Branch: United States Air Force
- Role: Remote piloted aircraft operations
- Part of: Air Combat Command
- Garrison/HQ: Holloman Air Force Base
- Decorations: Air Force Outstanding Unit Award

Insignia
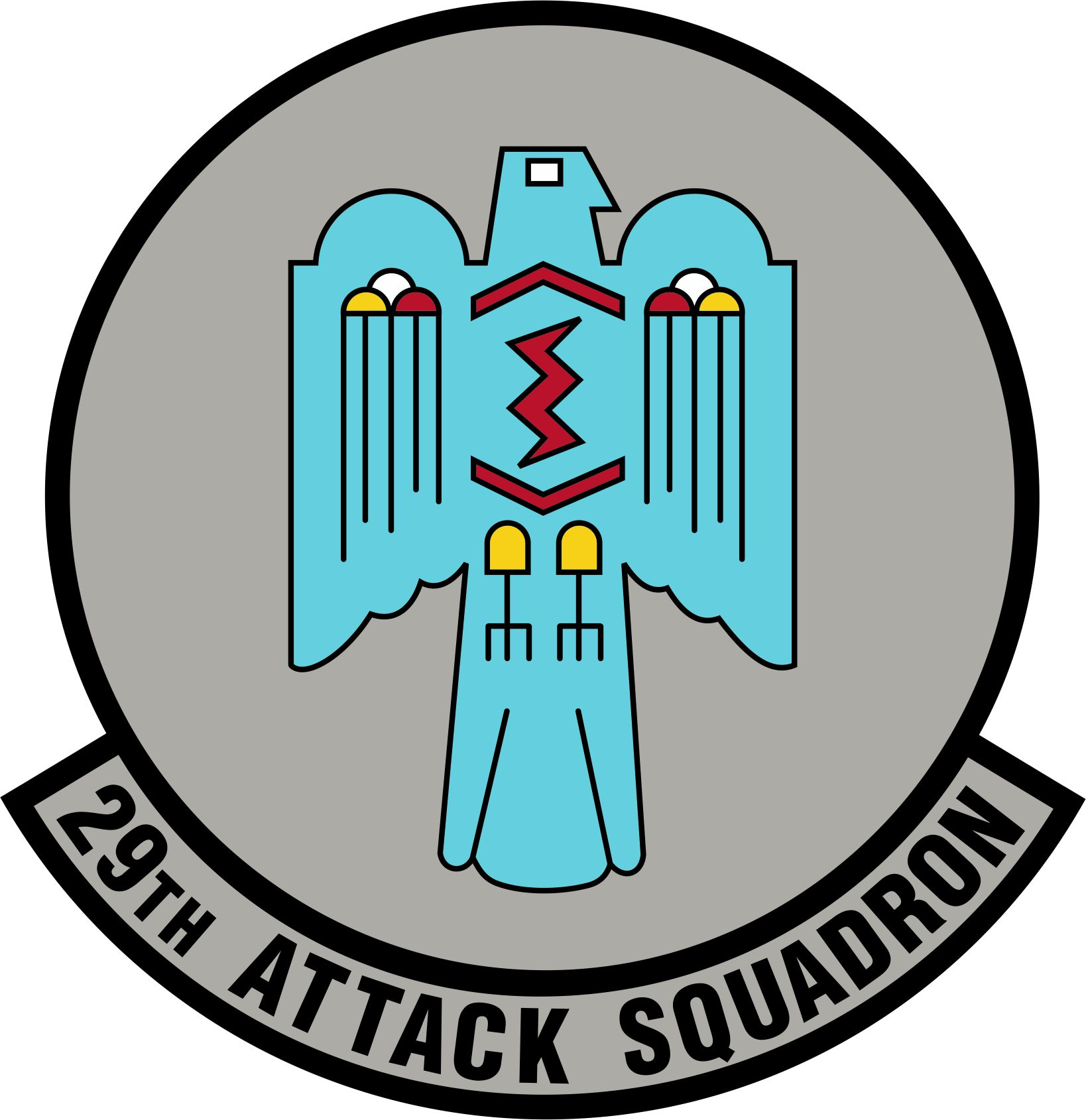
- 29th Attack Squadron emblem (approved 12 December 1956)

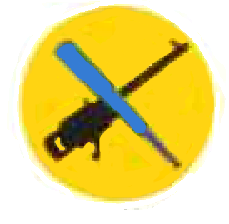
- 13th Observation Squadron emblem

The 29th Attack Squadron is a remotely piloted vehicle training unit of the United States Air Force. Assigned to the 49th Operations Group, 49th Wing at Holloman Air Force Base, New Mexico. Flying the General Atomics MQ-9 Reaper. It was activated on 23 October 2009.

== Overview ==
The 29th Attack Squadron MQ-9 Reaper remotely piloted aircraft (RPA) mission is to provide close air support (CAS), air interdiction, intelligence, surveillance and reconnaissance (ISR), and attack to eliminate threats when present. The multi-role capabilities of these RPAs allows combat search and rescue operations and extended time over targets to locate, track, target, strike, and assess time-sensitive targets

== History ==
=== World War II ===
Constituted as 13th Observation Squadron (Medium) on 5 February 1942. Activated on 10 Mar 1942 at Brooks Field, Texas, with O-52 observation aircraft and L-4 in the period 1942 to 1943. Redesignated as: 13th Observation Squadron on 4 July 1942; 13 Reconnaissance Squadron (Fighter) on 1 April 1943; 13th Tactical Reconnaissance Squadron on 11 August 1943. Operating P-39, 1943-1944 and P-40 1944–1945. Redesignated 29th Reconnaissance Squadron (Night Photographic) on 25 January 1946. Inactivated on 29 July 1946.

=== Cold War tactical reconnaissance ===
Redesignated as 29th Tactical Reconnaissance Squadron (Photo-Jet) on 14 January 1954. Under Tactical Air Command and equipped with RF-80A Shooting Stars at Shaw AFB, South Carolina. Performed training of reconnaissance pilots; being upgraded to the Republic RF-84F Thunderflash in 1955 and the McDonnell RF-101C Voodoo in 1957 as a component of the 432d Tactical Reconnaissance Group. Remained at Shaw when the 432d was inactivated and reassigned to the 363d Tactical Reconnaissance Wing. Redesignated as 29th Tactical Reconnaissance Squadron on 1 October 1966.

Equipped with the McDonnell RF-4C Phantom II due to a critical need for reconnaissance pilots due to the Vietnam War. Performed training on the RF-4C until 24 January 1971 when inactivated due to the USAF drawdown in Vietnam and budget reductions.

=== Remotely piloted vehicle operations ===
On 23 October 2009, the 29th Attack Squadron stood up under the 49th Wing at Holloman Air Force Base, New Mexico under the command of Lt Colonel James S. Merchant. An initial cadre of twelve instructors (six instructor pilots and six instructor sensor operators) manned the unit. The unit replaced the 432d Operations Group, Detachment 3. It is a General Atomics MQ-9 Reaper Formal Training Unit.

== Lineage ==
- Constituted as the 13th Observation Squadron (Medium) on 5 February 1942

Activated on 10 March 1942
Redesignated 13th Observation Squadron on 4 July 1942
Redesignated 13th Reconnaissance Squadron (Fighter) on 1 April 1943
Redesignated 13th Tactical Reconnaissance Squadron on 11 August 1943
Redesignated 29th Reconnaissance Squadron (Night Photographic) on 25 January 1946
Inactivated on 29 July 1946

- Redesignated 29th Tactical Reconnaissance Squadron (Photographic-Jet) on 14 January 1954

Activated on 18 March 1954

- Redesignated 29th Tactical Reconnaissance Squadron and activated on 1 October 1966

Inactivated 24 January 1971

- Redesignated 29th Attack Squadron on 20 October 2009

Activated on 23 October 2009

=== Assignments ===
- 74th Observation Group (later 74th Reconnaissance Group, 74th Tactical Reconnaissance Group), 2 March 1942
- XIX Tactical Air Command, 7 November 1945 (attached to 69th Reconnaissance Group)
- 69th Reconnaissance Group, 25 January–29 July 1946
- 432d Tactical Reconnaissance Group, 18 March 1954
- 432d Tactical Reconnaissance Wing, 8 February 1958 (attached to 363d Tactical Reconnaissance Wing after 8 April 1959)
- 363d Tactical Reconnaissance Wing, 18 May 1959
- 4403d Tactical Training Group, 1 July 1966
- 363d Tactical Reconnaissance Wing, 20 January 1968 – 24 January 1971
- 49th Operations Group, 23 October 2009 – present

=== Stations ===
- Brooks Field, Texas, 2 March 1942
- Lawson Field, Georgia, c. 8 March 1942;
- DeRidder Army Air Base, Louisiana, 11 April 1942
- Esler Field, Louisiana, 15 December 1942
- Desert Center Army Air Field, California, 28 December 1942
- Morris Field, North Carolina, 24 September 1943
- Camp Campbell Army Airfield, Kentucky, 5 November 1943
- DeRidder Army Air Base, Louisiana, 19 April 1944
- Stuttgart Army Air Field, Arkansas, 7 February 1945
- Brooks Field, Texas, 8 December 1945 – 29 July 1946
- Shaw Air Force Base, South Carolina, 18 March 1954 – 24 January 1971
- Holloman Air Force Base, New Mexico, 23 October 2009 – present

=== Aircraft ===
- Curtiss O-52 Owl, 1942–1943
- Piper L-4 Cub, 1942–1943;
- Bell P-39 Airacobra, 1943–1944
- Curtiss P-40F Warhawk, 1944–1945
- North American P-51 Mustang, 1945–1946
- North American F-6 Mustang, 1945–1946
- Douglas A-26 Invader, 1946
- Lockheed RF-80A Shooting Star, 1955
- Republic RF-84F Thunderflash, 1955–1958
- McDonnell RF-101C Voodoo, 1957–1971
- McDonnell RF-4C Phantom II, 1968–1971
- General Atomics MQ-9 Reaper, 2009–present
