= Aschenbrenner =

- Language: German

Origin
- Language: German
- Origin: Aschenbrenner
- Derivation: aschen + brenner
- Meaning: Ash burner

Other names
- Anglicisations: Ashabranner, Aschenbrener, Ashabraner

Aschenbrenner or Aschenbener is a German surname. An anglicized spelling variation is Ashabranner. Notable people with the surname include:

- Carl Aschenbrenner (1865–1941), American physician and politician
- Christian Heinrich Aschenbrenner (1654–1732), German violinist and composer
- Frank Aschenbrenner (1925–2012), American football player
- Franz Aschenbrenner (born 1986), German motorcycle racer
- Karl Aschenbrenner (1911–1988), American philosopher, translator, and author
- Leopold Aschenbrenner (born 2001 or 2002), German-American AI researcher
- Matthias Aschenbrenner (born 1972), German mathematician
- Peter J. Aschenbrenner (born 1945), American lawyer and historian
- Rolf Alfons Aschenbrenner, German engineer
- Rosa Aschenbrenner (1885–1967), German politician
- Wilhelmine Aschenbrenner (1791 – after 1834), German actress

Ashabranner:

- Brent Ashabranner (1921–2016), American Peace Corps administrator and children's literature writer

Aschenbener:

- Robert W. Aschenbrener (1920–2009), US World War II flying ace
