= 8th Fighter Squadron =

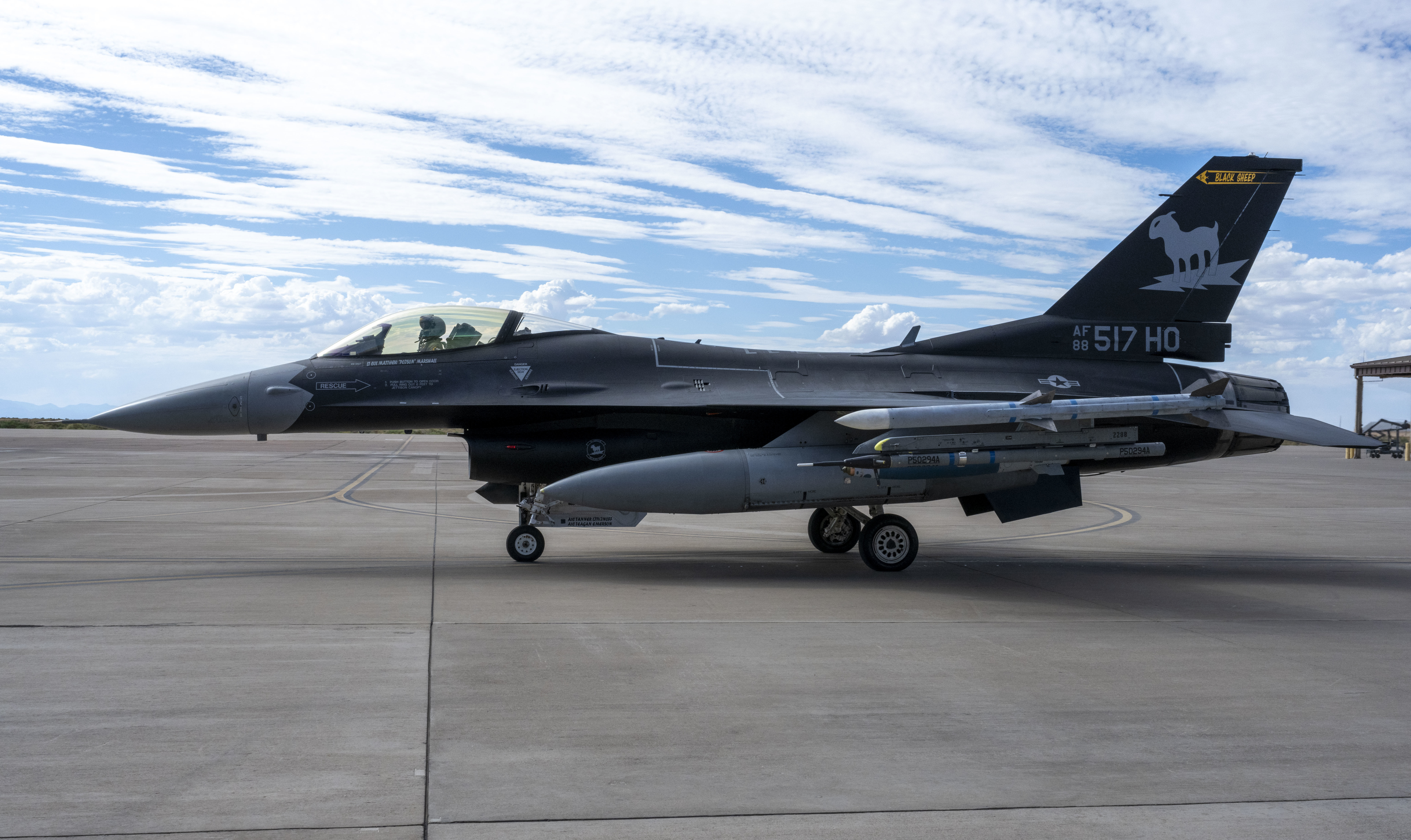
- 8th Fighter Squadron F-16 Fighting Falcon at Holloman Air Force Base
- Active: 1941-1957; 1957–2008; 2009–2011; 2017–present
- Branch: United States Air Force
- Type: Squadron
- Role: Air Supremacy
- Part of: Air Combat Command
- Nickname: The Black Sheep
- Engagements: World War II (Asia-Pacific Theater) Korean War Kosovo Campaign Operation Iraqi Freedom

- Decorations: Distinguished Unit Citation (5x) Air Force Meritorious Unit Award Air Force Outstanding Unit Award (3x) Philippine Presidential Unit Citation Republic of Korea Presidential Unit Citation (2x)

Commanders
- Current commander: Lt Col Matt "Poison" Marshall

Insignia
- 8th Fighter Squadron emblem (approved 12 May 1960)

The 8th Fighter Squadron is an active United States Air Force squadron, assigned to the 54th Fighter Group Air Combat Command, stationed at Holloman Air Force Base, New Mexico. It currently operates the General Dynamics F-16 Fighting Falcon aircraft, conducting initial training, transition and instructor upgrades training.

== History ==
=== World War II ===
The 8th Fighter Squadron traces its origins to the U.S. Army Air Forces' 49th Pursuit Group, formed at Selfridge Field, Michigan on 20 November 1940. The 8th Pursuit Squadron was equipped with Seversky P-35s that were transferred from the 1st Pursuit Group when it left for Rockwell Field, California. In May 1941, the squadron proceeded to Morrison Field in West Palm Beach, Florida, to train in the Curtiss P-40 Warhawk fighter.

With the advent of World War II, the squadron moved to Australia and became part of Fifth Air Force in January 1942. It was re-designated as the 8th Fighter Squadron in May 1942. The unit received Curtiss P-40 Warhawks in Australia and, after training for a short time, provided air defense for the Northern Territory.

The squadron moved to New Guinea in October 1942 to help stall the Japanese drive southward from Buna to Port Moresby. It engaged primarily in air defense of Port Moresby, but also escorted bombers and transports; and attacked enemy installations, supply lines, and troop concentrations to support Allied ground forces.

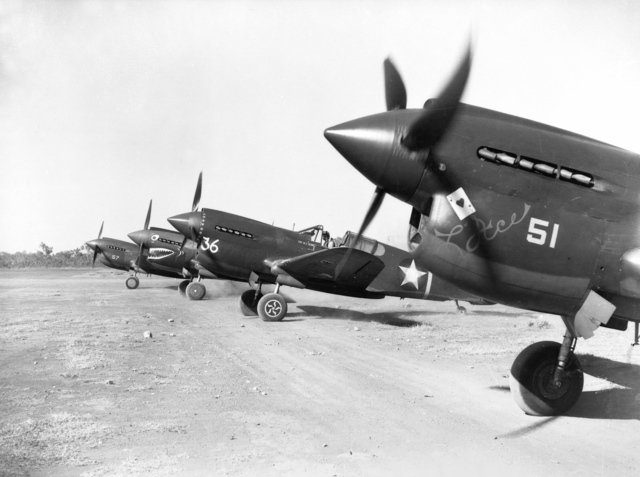
8th Pursuit Squadron P-40Es at Darwin, Australia, in June 1942

The 8th participated in the Allied offensive that pushed the Japanese back along the Kokoda Track, took part in the Battle of the Bismarck Sea in March 1943, fought for control of the approaches to Huon Gulf, and supported ground forces during the campaign in which the Allies eventually recovered New Guinea. It covered the landings on Noemfoor and had a part in. the conquest of Biak.

During this time, the 8th acquired a new nickname. While the 7th and 9th Fighter Squadrons received new aircraft, the 8th received the older aircraft being replaced by the other squadrons. Unhappy with being last on the supply line and not liking the unlucky "Eightballs” name, the pilots began calling their unit "The Black Sheep" Squadron. The name stuck and a Disney artist designed the distinctive logo.

After having used Lockheed P-38 Lightnings, Curtiss P-40 Warhawks and Republic P-47 Thunderbolts, the 8th was equipped completely in September 1944 with P-38's, which were used to fly long-range escort and attack missions to Mindanao, Halmahera, Seram, and Borneo. The unit arrived in the Philippines in October 1944, shortly after the assault landings on Leyte and engaged enemy fighters, attacked shipping in Ormoc Bay, supported ground forces, and covered the Allied invasion of Luzon.

Other missions from the Philippines included strikes against industry and transportation on Formosa and against shipping along the China coast. During World War II the 8th amassed an impressive record of 207 aerial victories. Notable "aces" included Robert W. Aschenbrener (10), Ernest Harris (10), Robert White (9), George Kiser (9), Sammie Pierce (7), James Morehead (7), Willie Drier (6), James Hagerstrom (6), Robert Howard (6), Don Meuten(6), Nial Castle(5), William Day (5), Marion Felts (5), Nelson Flack (5). The 8th Fighter Squadron and its sister squadrons (7th and 9th Fighter Squadrons) attained a record of 668 aerial victories, unmatched in the Pacific Theater.

After the Japanese surrender, the squadron moved to the Japanese Home Islands, initially being stationed at the former Imperial Japanese Navy Atsugi Airfield, near Tokyo on 15 September 1945. Its war-weary P-38 Lightnings were sent back to the United States and the squadron was re-equipped with North American P-51D Mustangs with a mission of both occupation duty and show-of-force flights. In February 1946, the squadron was moved to Chitose Air Base, on northern Honshu and assumed an air defense mission over Honshu and also Hokkaido Island. The pilots of the squadron were told to prevent Soviet Air Force aircraft from entering Japanese airspace, as there was tension between the United States and the Soviet Union about Soviet occupation forces landing on Hokkaido. In April 1948, the squadron moved to the newly rebuilt Misawa Air Base when the host 49th Fighter Group took up home station responsibilities. At Misawa, the squadron moved into the jet age when it was re-equipped with the Lockheed F-80C Shooting Star.

=== Korean War ===
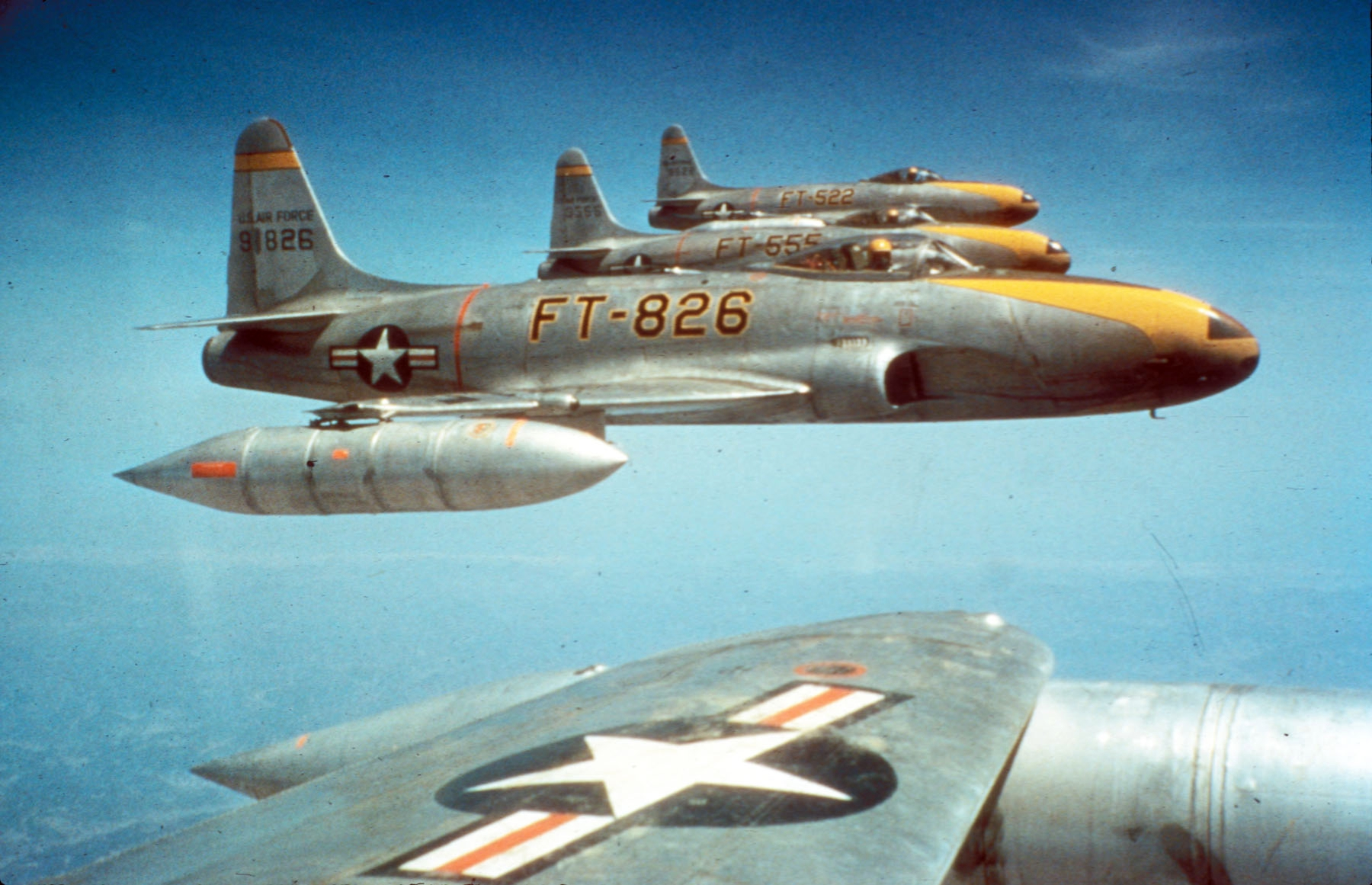
8th FBS F-80Cs over Korea, 1950

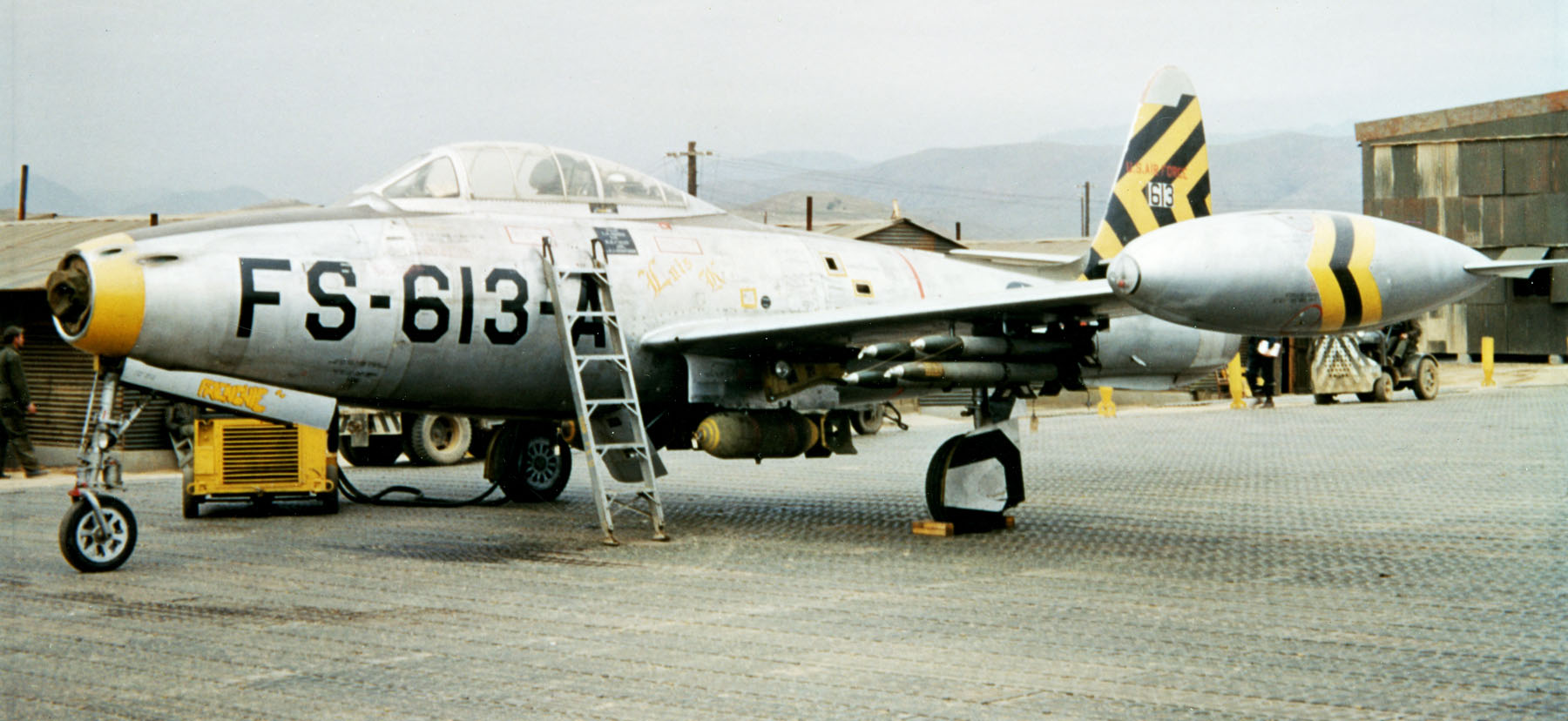
The fully armed squadron CO's F-84E during the Korean War

With the outbreak of the Korean War in June 1950, the 8th was one of the first USAF squadrons dispatched to Korea from Japan, initially operating propeller-driven F-51Ds to cover the evacuation of civilians from Kimpo and Suwon. Next, it flew close air support missions to help slow the advancing North Korean armies. Later, it turned to the interdiction of enemy troops, supplies and communications from Misawa. However its short-range F-80Cs meant that the 49th had to move to South Korea in order for them to be effective.

The squadron moved to Taegu Air Base (K-2) on 1 October 1950, becoming the first jet fighter outfit to operate from bases in South Korea. During the autumn of 1950 and spring of 1951, the squadron flew combat missions on a daily basis from Tageu, flying escort missions for Boeing B-29 Superfortresses over North Korea and engaging Communist MiG-15 fighters in air-to-air combat. When the Chinese Communist Forces (CCF) Intervention Campaign gained momentum in 1950–1951, the squadron again concentrated on the ground support mission, attacking Communist Chinese ground units in North Korea, moving south until the line was stabilized and held just south of Seoul.

The 49th changed equipment to the Republic F-84E Thunderjet in mid-1951, It engaged Communist forces on the ground in support of the 1st UN Counteroffensive Campaign (1951). Afterwards, it engaged primarily in air interdiction operations against the main enemy channel of transportation, the roads and railroads between Pyongyang and Sinuiju. Also, it flew close air support missions for the ground forces and attacked high-value targets, including the Sui-ho hydroelectric plants in June 1952 and the Kumgang Political School in October 1952. On 27 July 1953, the squadron joined with the 58th FBG to bomb Sunan Airfield for the final action of F-84 fighter-bombers during the Korean War.

The wing remained in Korea for a time after the armistice. It was reassigned to Japan in November 1953 and returned to its air defense mission. The squadron upgraded to the North American F-86F Sabre in 1956. (Note: Bailey indicates the squadron continued to fly Thunderjets until inactivated.) By late 1957, however, worldwide Department of Defense budget restrictions during FY 1958 meant that the 49th Fighter-Bomber Wing and its elements would be inactivated as part of a reduction of the USAF units based in Japan.

=== United States Air Forces in Europe ===
After the 8th's inactivation in Japan, the 8th assumed the aircraft, personnel and equipment of the 562d Fighter-Bomber Squadron at Étain-Rouvres AB, France on 10 December 1957. The 562d was simultaneously inactivated. As the 8th had been a part of American forces in the Pacific since it was sent to Australia in January 1942, the assignment to Europe after fifteen years in the Pacific was a major change for the organization.

Taking over the seven North American F-100D Super Sabres and three dual-seat F-100F trainers of the 561st, the squadron continued its normal peacetime training. The squadron began keeping four of its planes on 15-minute alert (Victor Alert) on 1 February 1958 so a portion of the squadron could react quickly in an emergency. During the fall of 1958, most of the squadron operated from Chalon-Vatry Air Base while the runway at Etain was being repaired and resurfaced.

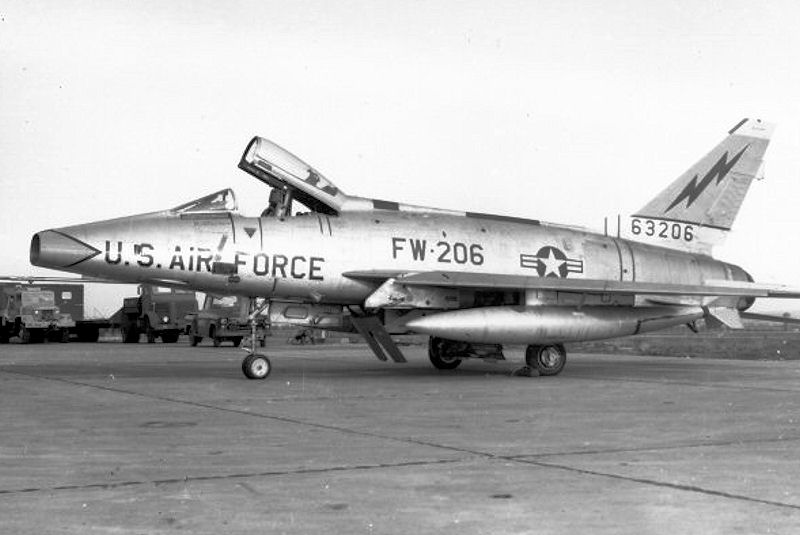
8th Tactical Fighter Squadron F-100D Super Sabre at Étain-Rouvres AB (Note: Aircraft is North American F-100D Super Sabre serial 56-3206, taken in 1958.)

However, the nuclear-capable F-100 was troublesome to the host French Government, the French decreed that all United States nuclear weapons and delivery aircraft had to be removed from French soil by July 1958. As a result, the F-100s of the 8th had to be removed from France. After negotiations with the French, the 49th Wing's commander was informed that the wing would be departing from France on 1 July 1959 and move to Spangdahlem Air Base, West Germany. During the relocation to West Germany, the squadron deployed to Wheelus Air Base, Libya, for gunnery training. However, not all squadron personnel moved to Spangdahlem, as many of the 10th Tactical Reconnaissance Wing personnel there were almost at the end of their tours and did not want to move to RAF Alconbury, where the 10th was moving to in order to make space for the 49th Wing. As a result, some squadron ground support personnel instead moved to RAF Lakenheath, England to backfill vacancies there associated with the Super Sabre, while 10th Wing personnel at Spangdahlem were allowed to finish out their assignments.

At Spangdahlem, the squadron flew F-100s until 1961 when it converted to the Republic F-105D Thunderchief, commonly known as the "Thud". The 49th TFW was only the third USAF unit to operate the F-105. As part of USAFE, the 8th participated in many NATO exercises. In February 1967, the 8th opened the 49th Weapons Training Detachment at Wheelus Air Base, Libya, to begin transition to the McDonnell F-4D Phantom II, and received its first F-4D on 9 March 1967.

In the late 1960s, the Defense Budget began to be squeezed by the costs of the ongoing Vietnam War. Secretary of Defense Robert MacNamara decided to reduce costs in Europe by "Dual Basing" United States military units in Europe by returning them permanently to the United States, and conducting annual deployment exercises in Europe, giving the units a NATO commitment for deployment to bases in Europe if tensions with the Soviet Union warranted an immediate military buildup. The 49th Tactical Fighter Wing was returned to the United States under this policy, being reassigned on 1 July 1968 to Holloman Air Force Base, New Mexico, to serve as the US Air Force's first dual-based, NATO-committed wing.

=== Holloman Air Force Base ===
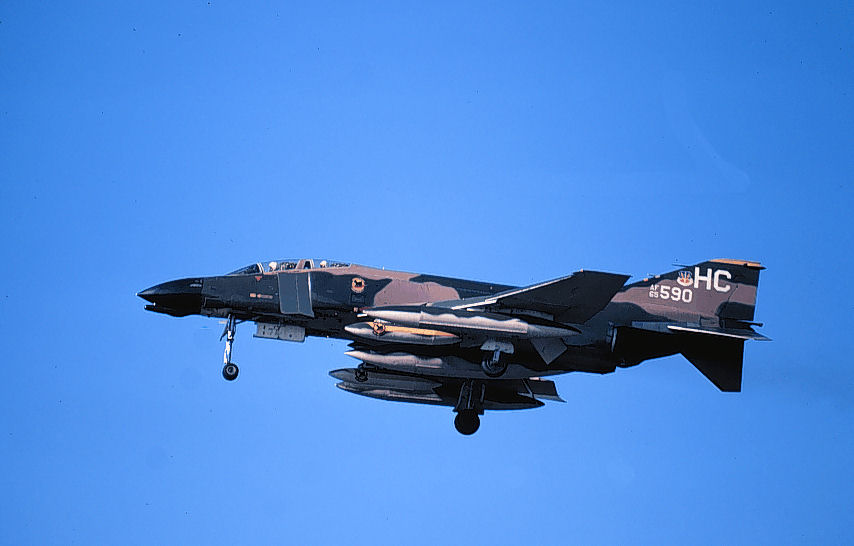
8th Tactical Fighter Squadron F-4D about 1970 (Note: Aircraft is McDonnell F-4D Phantom II serial 65-590 1970 with squadron "HC" tail code.)

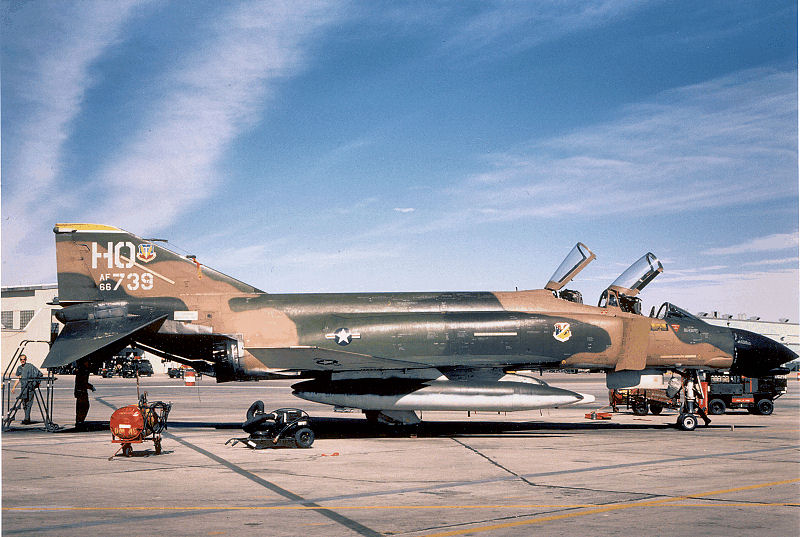
8th Tactical Fighter Squadron F-4D about 1976 (Note: Aircraft is McDonnell F-4D Phantom II serial 66-7739 after changeover to "HO" tail code.)

At Holloman, the squadron participated in Tactical Air Command tactical exercises and firepower demonstrations to maintain combat readiness. Also, the first "Tail Codes" to identify squadron aircraft were applied, rather than the traditional yellow colors of the 8th which had been used since the Korean War. Initially "HC" was the tail code identifier for the 8th, however, in 1972, the Air Force issued AFM 66-1 which specified wing tail codes and the squadron's planes were standardized on the 49th's "HO" tail code. However, a yellow tail stripe was applied to identify squadron aircraft.

The 8th also retained its NATO commitment to return once a year to its "dual base" home in West Germany. These deployments were known as "Crested Cap", and are listed belowi in the squadron station list. With the end of the Cold War and subsequent force drawdowns by USAFE, these annual exercises ended in 1991.

==== Takhli Royal Thai Air Force Base ====
On 4 May 1972, after North Vietnam invaded [South Vietnam, the entire 49th Wing, except for a rear echelon that remained to run Holloman, deployed to Takhli Royal Thai Air Force Base, Thailand. Operation Constant Guard III, ordered in response to the North Vietnamese invasion, was the largest movement that Tactical Air Command had ever performed. In nine days, the squadron deployed its F-4D Phantom IIs from Holloman to Takhli. Airmen arriving reported that Takhli was a mess, with missing or broken plumbing fixtures, no hot water, and no drinking water - that had to be trucked in from Korat every day. Bed frames had been thrown out of the hootches into the high snake-infested grass, and mattresses or bedding consisted of sleeping bags at best.

The 8th flew combat sorties in South Vietnam, Cambodia, and Laos from 1 July to 24 September 1972 during Operation Linebacker, the bombardment campaign in North Vietnam. During this deployment, Operation Constant Guard, the squadron flew over just about every battle zone from An Loc to vital installations in the Hanoi vicinity. During five months of combat, the squadron did not lose any aircraft or personnel. The unit officially closed out its Southwest Asia duty 6 October 1972.

==== F-15A Eagle era ====
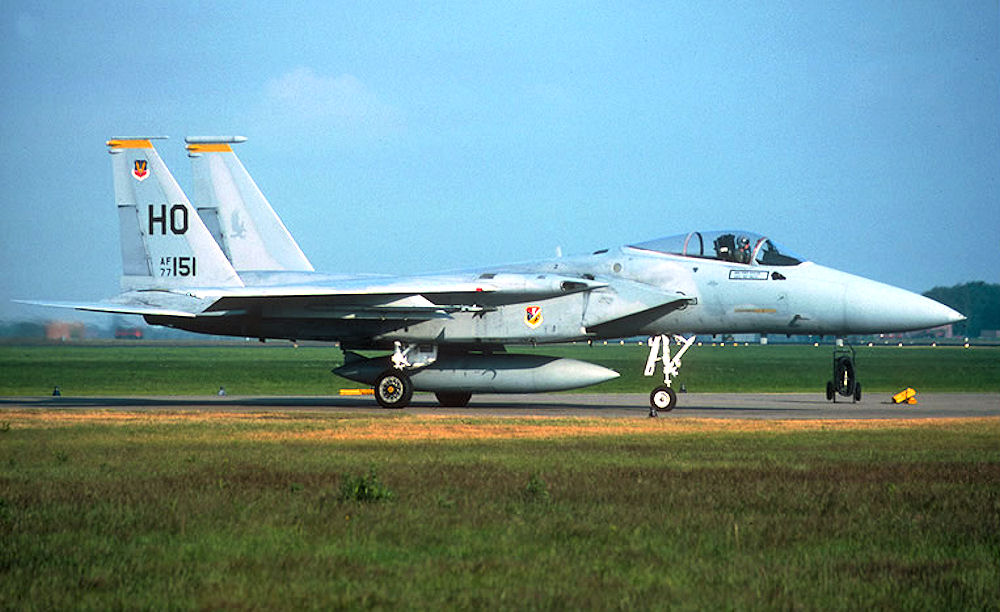
8th Tactical Fighter Squadron F-15A (Note: Aircraft is McDonnell Douglas F-15A Eagle serial 77-151, taken in 1981.)

In October 1977, the 49th Wing ended its "dual-base" commitment to NATO and changed to an air superiority mission with the wing beginning a conversion from the F-4D Phantom II to the McDonnell Douglas F-15A Eagle, the 49th being the second USAF operational wing to receive the F-15A. The transition was completed 4 June 1978.

Due to the change in equipment, the annual NATO deployments were taken over by the 4th Tactical Fighter Wing at Seymour Johnson Air Force Base, in 1978; however they resumed (although not on an annual basis) in 1981. In the United States, training missions was refocused on dissimilar air combat tactics for multi-theater operations, participating in numerous Red Flags, Joint Training exercises, and deployments in the Air Defense/Superiority Mission. Frequent deployments were made to Nellis Air Force Base, Nevada to exercise with the Northrop F-5E Tiger II "Aggressor" aircraft of the 57th Fighter Weapons Wing, and other aircraft types (including clandestine exercises with Soviet aircraft flown by the 4477th Test and Evaluation Squadron at Tonopah Test Range Airport, Nevada). Also, after TAC absorbed the interceptor mission of Aerospace Defense Command in 1979, the squadron maintained the TAC NORAD air defense alert commitment in the Eagle, with the best scramble times in NORAD.

With the introduction of the F-15C Eagle in the mid-1980s, the upgraded Eagle began replacing the F-15A and Bs in service with all of the USAF units that had previously been operating the Eagle with the exception of the 49th Wing. By the time of Operation Desert Storm in 1991, the F-15A Eagles at Holloman had been relegated to a training role; combat deployments of the Eagle were the purview of F-15C units.

==== F-117 Nighthawk era ====
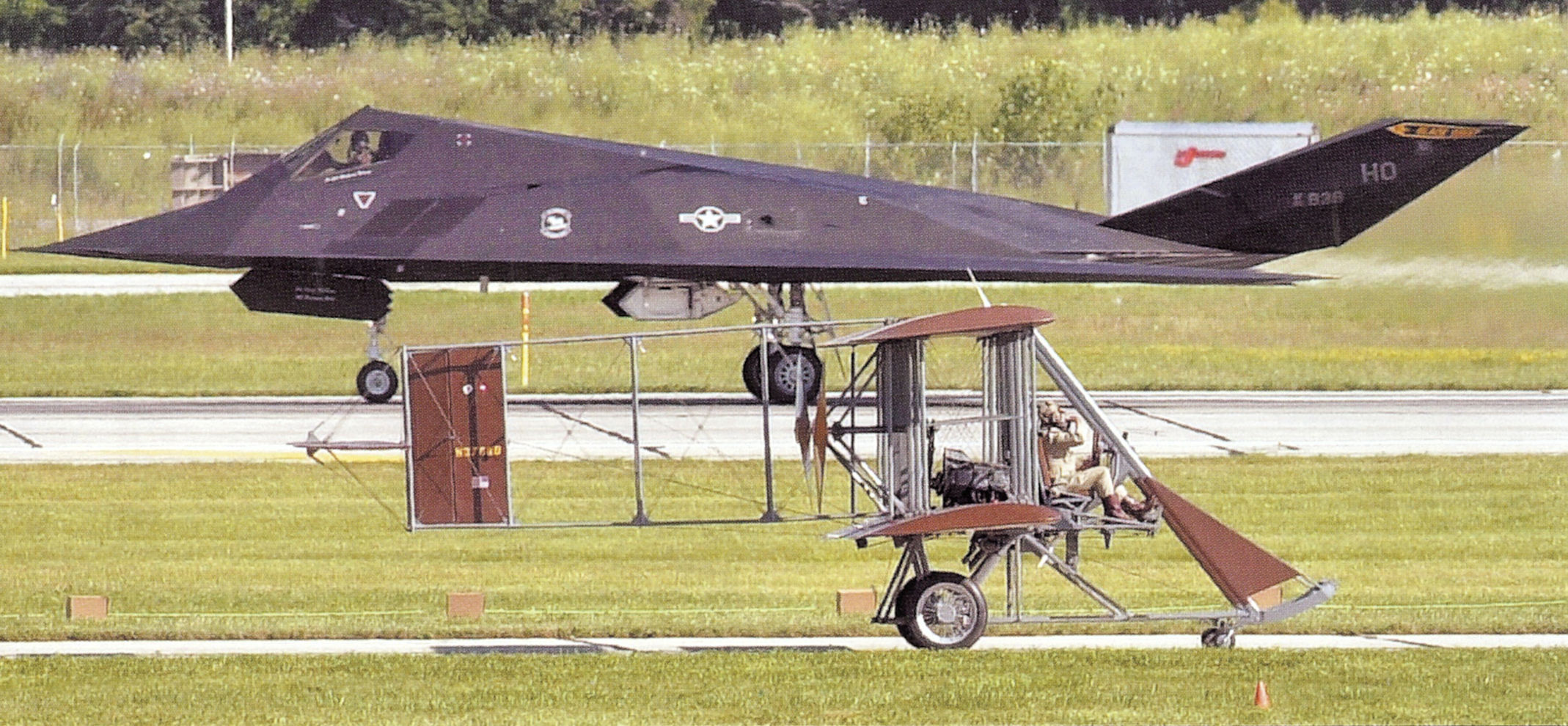
8th Fighter Squadron F-117A taxiing by a Wright "B" Flyer (Note: Aircraft is Lockheed F-117A Nighthawk serial 86-838. Taken during the US Air and Trade Show at Dayton International Airport, 17 July 2003.)

In 1992, the 49th Fighter Wing underwent a number of transitions. As a result of the end of the Cold War, reduced defense budgets were the order of the day. As a result, the 8th Fighter Squadron retired its F-15A Eagles and received the Lockheed F-117A Nighthawk stealth fighters of the 416th Fighter Squadron, which was simultaneously inactivated.

After conversion to the F-117A in May 1992, The 8th deployed fighters and their crews to Southwest Asia during the 1990s as part of Operation Southern Watch to support United Nations (UN) weapons inspectors in Iraq, to enforce the no-fly zone over the southern part of that country to deprive Saddam Hussein of his Weapons of Mass Destruction (WMD) programs and to force his compliance with the UN monitoring regime. 8th F-117s fighters deployed to the Gulf in 1998 during Operation Desert Fox to upgrade the strike force's capability to attack high-value targets. But the 18-hour flight from Holloman AFB to Kuwait meant that the operation was over before the F-117 aircraft arrived in the Gulf.

===== Operation Allied Force =====
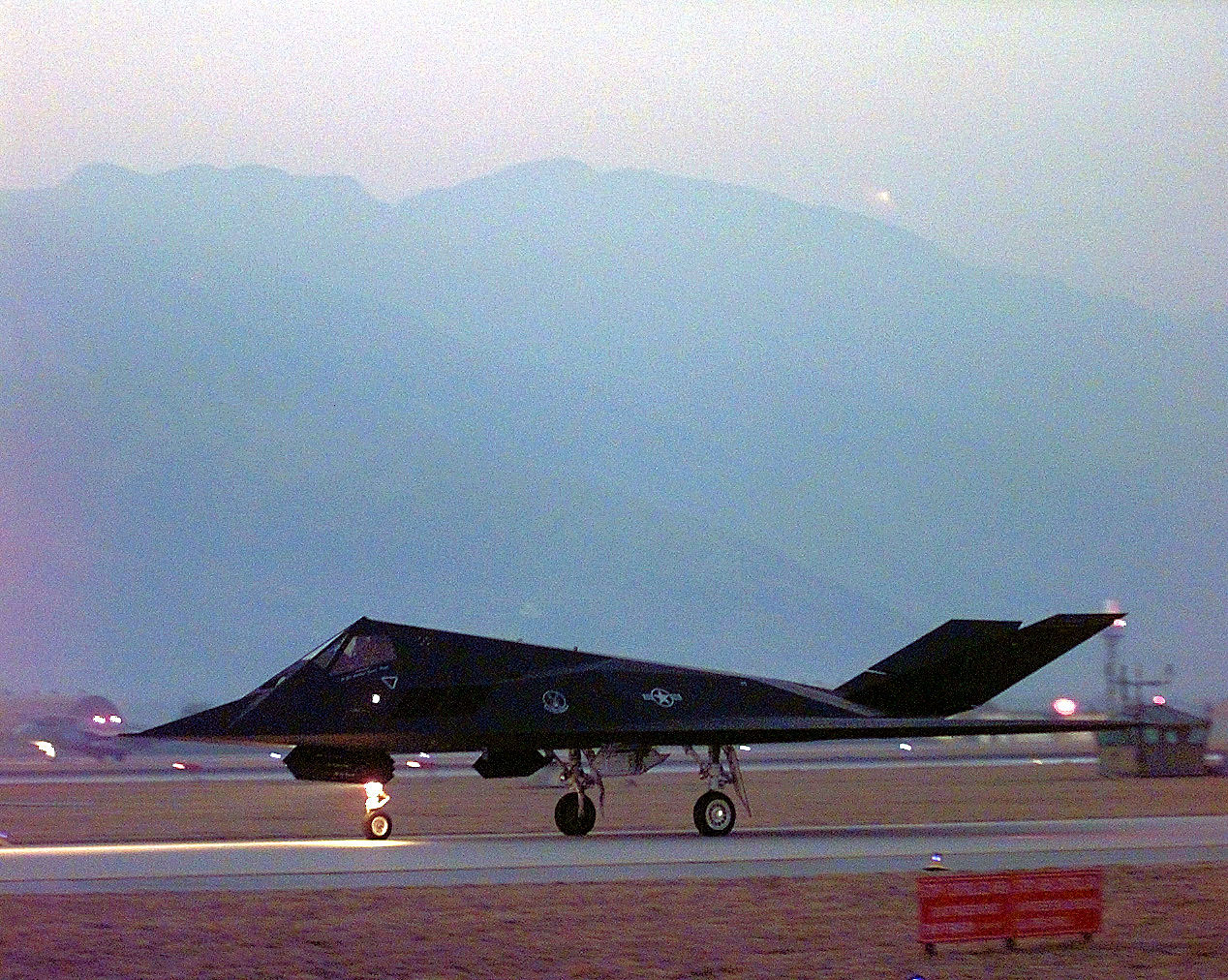
An 8th Expeditionary Fighter Squadron F-117 taxis at Aviano Air Base, Italy, for an air strike mission during Operation Allied Force on 24 March 1999

On 21 February, the 8th deployed F-117 and their crews to Aviano Air Base, Italy and Spangdahlem Air Base, Germany, remaining until 1 July 1999, in support of Operation Allied Force, the NATO attempt to stop ethnic cleansing in Kosovo in the former nation of Yugoslavia. In the opening phase of the operation, aimed primarily at Yugoslavia's integrated air defense system, NATO air forces conducted more than 400 sorties. During the first two night attacks, allied air forces struck 90 targets throughout Yugoslavia and in Kosovo. F-117 Nighthawks from the 8th Expeditionary Fighter Squadron participated in air strikes against targets in the Balkans during NATO operations bravely trusting in their aircraft's low observable technology struck some of the most valuable and highly guarded targets in Serbia. The F-117s successfully penetrated the heavily defended areas, which conventional aircraft could not reach.

One F-117 fighter was lost over Yugoslavia on 27 March 1999, apparently struck by a salvo of SA-3 Goa surface-to-air missiles. Unknown to NATO, Yugoslav air defenses operators had found they could detect F-117s with their "obsolete" Soviet radars after some modifications that could detect the aircraft when their wheels were down or bomb bay doors were open. A US search and rescue team picked up the pilot several hours after the F-117 went down outside Belgrade. This was the first and so far the only F-117 to have been lost in action. On 1 April 1999, Defense Secretary William Cohen directed 12 more F-117 stealth fighters to join NATO Operation Allied Force, to join the total of 24 F-117s that were participating in NATO Operation Allied Force.

===== Operation Enduring Freedom =====
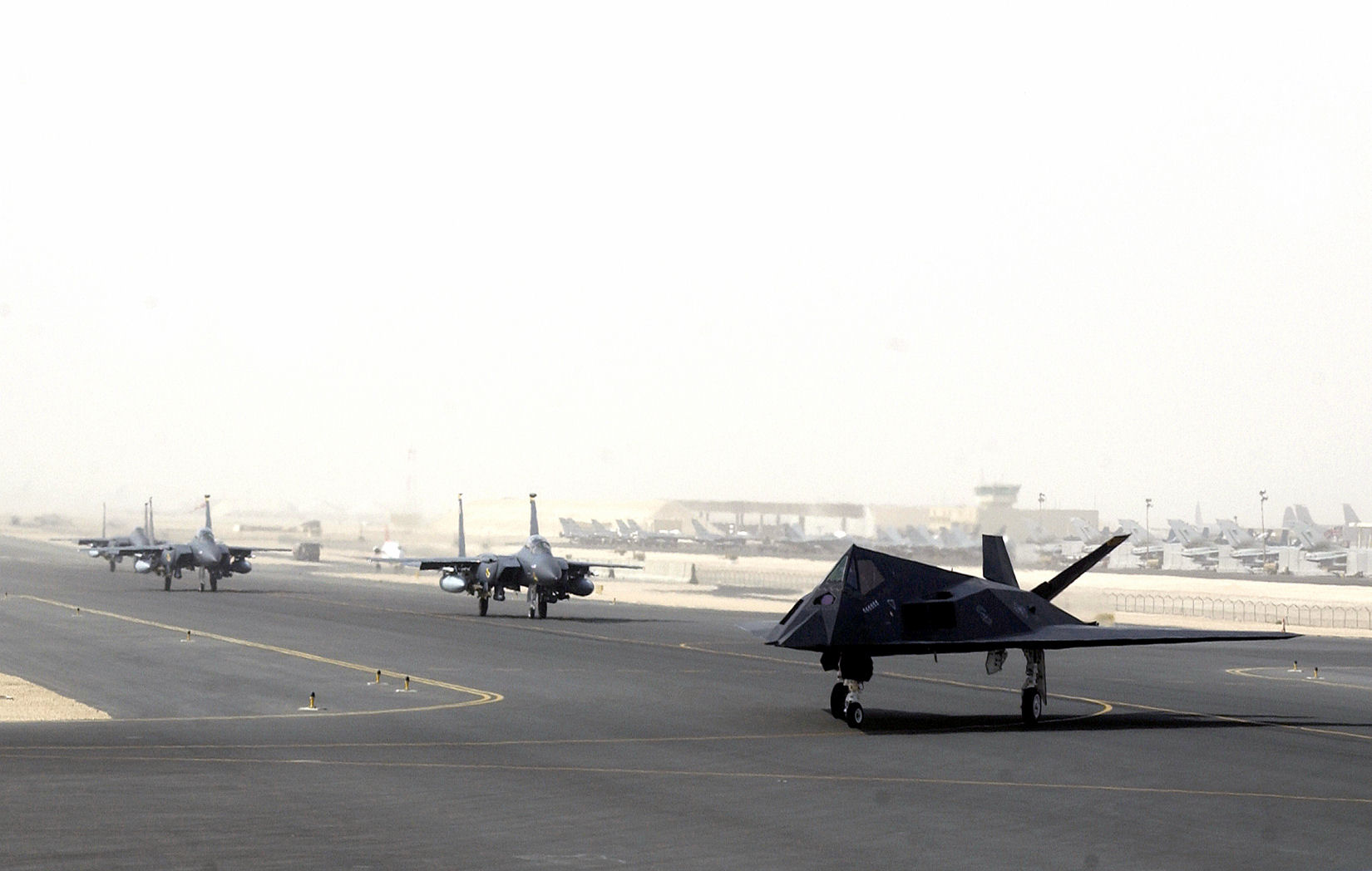
An 8th Expeditionary Fighter Squadron F-117 and F-15s prepare to fly from Al Udeid Air Base, Qatar, during Operation Enduring Freedom

People, airplanes, and equipment of the 49th Fighter Wing played a key role in Operation Iraqi Freedom. The wing's F-117s played a major role, dropping the first bombs against an Iraqi leadership target in Baghdad on 19 March 2003.

Deployed to Al Udeid Air Base, Qatar, assigned to the 379th Air Expeditionary Wing, on the opening night of the invasion, fresh intelligence was received that Iraqi President Saddam Hussein was staying at a specific bunker for the night. USAF planners had a rare opportunity to kill the elusive Iraqi leader. It was reasoned that might bring down his regime without war. The F-117s would carry the new GPS-guided EGBU-27 precision guided bomb. The problem was it had never been used in combat and the weapons had arrived at Al Udeid a mere 24 hours earlier.

Combat preparation of the fighters began immediately. The plan called for the F-117s to take off as soon as possible. Two stealth fighters roared northward into the nighttime sky at 3:38 a.m. After refueling over the Gulf near Kuwait City, the stealth fighters split up and took separate routes over Iraq to the target area. The sun was starting to come up by the time the pilots reached Baghdad, however on that morning Baghdad was obscured under low-level clouds. Each of the two F-117s released two bombs, which plummeted toward the bunker in which Saddam Hussein was believed to be sleeping. Release came at 5:30 a.m., 13 minutes after dawn but only five hours after the pilots first heard that such a mission might be in the offing. The strike caught Iraqi defenses completely off guard. Defensive anti-aircraft fire did not begin until the aircraft had completed the attack and were racing out of the Baghdad area.

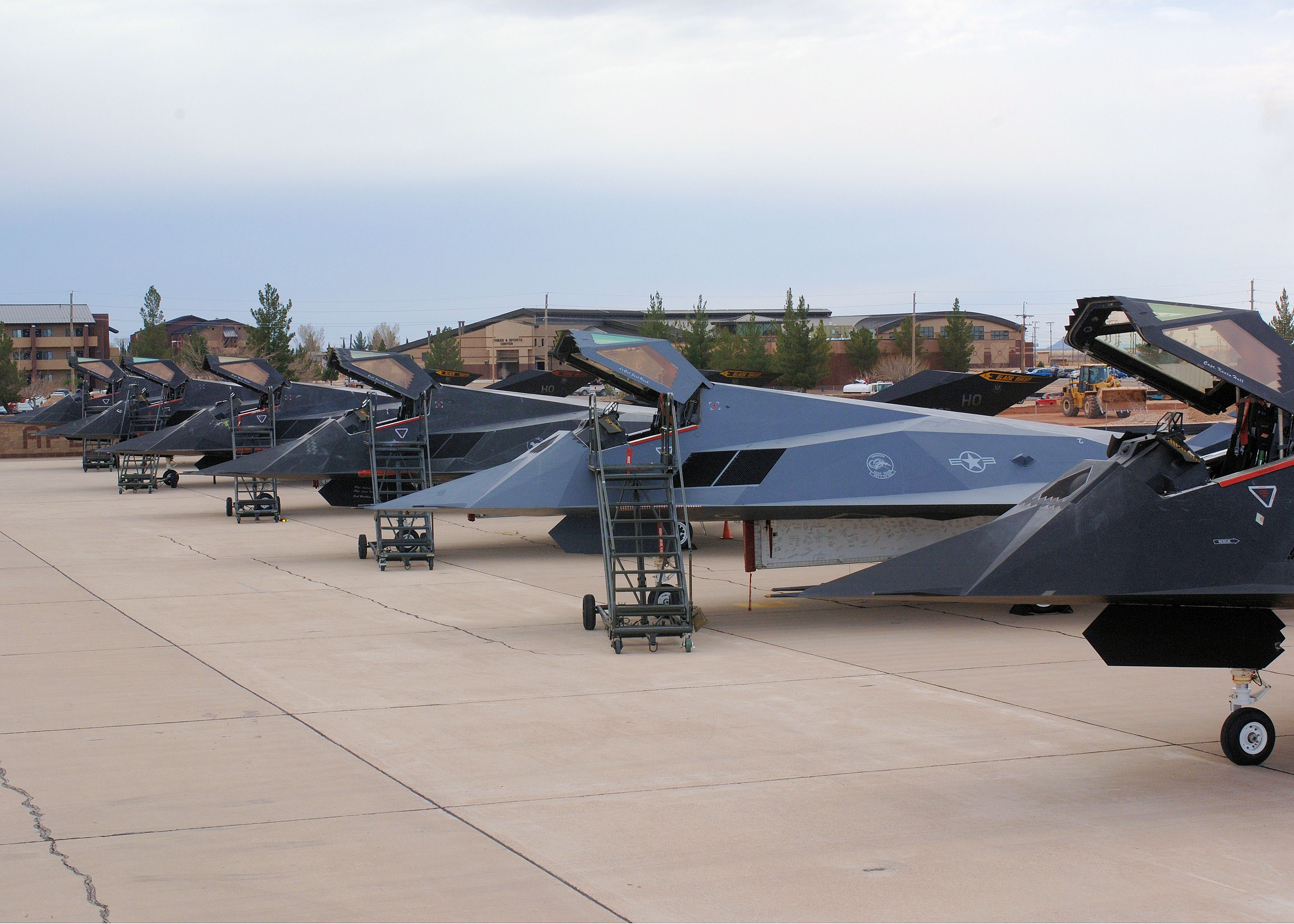
8th FS F-117s prepare to be flown into retirement, 12 March 2007

Although the strike did not kill Saddam Hussein, what it did accomplish was to allow the coalition to seize the initiative. Also the EGBU-27 immediately became the F-117's premier weapon. According to Air Force data, 98 of them were delivered during the conflict, compared to only 11 of the traditional, predominantly laser versions. During Operation Iraqi Freedom, F-117 pilots flew more than 80 missions and dropped nearly 100 enhanced guided bomb units against key targets. Approximately 300 people deployed with the air package and provided direct support to the F-117 mission.

In 2006, the Air Force announced that Holloman AFB would cease to be the home of the F-117A Nighthawk, coinciding with the announcement that the aircraft was set to be retired from service by 2008. The planes were sent to their former base at Tonopah Airport, Nevada for retirement and long-term indoor storage. Tonopah was selected to store the aircraft as it was stated that even in retirement, the stealth technology of the aircraft remained classified. Therefore, the planes would be stored in their former hangars where they were originally kept during the years the existence of the aircraft was secret. The last F-117A Nighthawk flew to Tonopah in late April 2008, and as a result, the 8th inactivated for the first time after 67 years of active service on 16 May 2008.

==== F-22A Raptor era ====
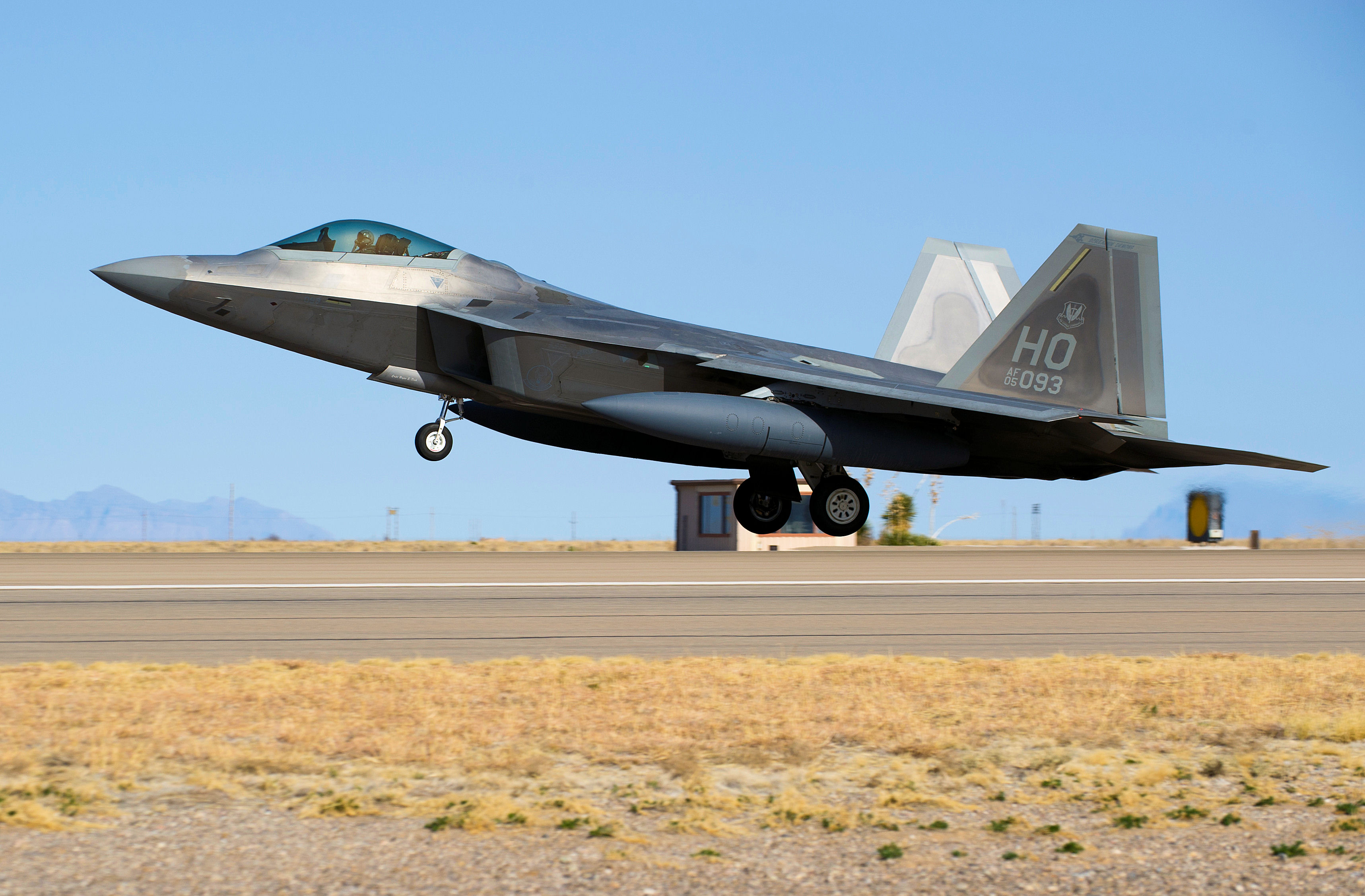
8th Fighter Squadron F-22A taking off (Note: Aircraft is Lockheed Martin F-22A Block 30 Raptor serial 05-4093.)

The inactivation of the 8th, however, was brief as it was reactivated on 25 Sept 2009, and equipped with the Lockheed Martin F-22A Raptor. The 8th, was the second of two F-22A squadrons to be activated at Holloman and joined the previously equipped 7th Fighter Squadron. The squadron was equipped with 18 F-22s, the last aircraft being received in 2010.

The 8th Fighter Squadron deployed frequently to overseas locations in support of United States objectives. However, after less than two years of operating F-22s, in 2010 it was announced that the squadron would stand down due to the Air Force's Raptor fleet consolidation plan, which called for Holloman to give up its two squadrons of F-22s for two General Dynamics F-16 Fighting Falcon training squadrons. As a result, some of the 8th FS F-22s went temporarily to the 7th Fighter Squadron, while others were transferred to the 3d Wing at Joint Base Elmendorf-Richardson, Alaska; the 1st Fighter Wing at Joint Base Langley-Eustis, Virginia, and to the USAF Weapons School at Nellis Air Force Base, Nevada.

In May 2011, the squadron became non-operational and on 15 July 2011, the 8th Fighter squadron was inactivated.

==== F-16 Fighting Falcon era ====
The 8th Fighter Squadron was reactivated at Holloman Air Force Base, with the formal activation ceremony taking place on 4 August 2017, as a F-16 Fighting Falcon unit and part of the 54th Fighter Group, which was then a geographically separated unit of the 56th Fighter Wing from Luke Air Force Base, Arizona. In October 2018, the Fighter Group was re-aligned under the 49th Wing when Holloman was allocated to AETC. As a formal training unit, the personnel of the 8th FS instruct F-16 initial, transition, and instructor upgrade training. They fly alongside the 311th and 314th Fighter Squadrons at Holloman.

== Lineage ==
- Constituted as the 8th Pursuit Squadron (Interceptor) on 20 November 1940

Activated on 15 January 1941
Redesignated 8th Fighter Squadron on 15 May 1942
Redesignated 8th Fighter Squadron, Single Engine on 20 August 1943
Redesignated 8th Fighter Squadron, Two Engine on 6 November 1944
Redesignated 8th Fighter Squadron, Single Engine on 8 January 1946
Redesignated 8th Fighter Squadron, Jet Propelled on 1 May 1948
Redesignated 8th Fighter Squadron, Jet on 10 August 1948
Redesignated 8th Fighter-Bomber Squadron on 1 February 1950
Redesignated 8th Tactical Fighter Squadron on 8 July 1958
Redesignated 8th Fighter Squadron on 1 November 1991
Inactivated on 16 May 2008

- Activated on 25 Sept 2009

Inactivated on 15 July 2011
Activated c. 4 August 2017

=== Assignments ===
- 49th Pursuit Group (later 49th Fighter Group 49th Fighter-Bomber Group), 15 January 1941 – 15 October 1957 (attached to 49th Fighter-Bomber Wing after 15 April 1957)
- 49th Fighter-Bomber Wing (later 49th Tactical Fighter Wing, 49th Fighter Wing), 10 December 1957 (attached to 26th Tactical Reconnaissance Wing c. 15 September–8 October 1970 and 24 August–1 October 1971, 50th Tactical Fighter Wing, 8 March–2 April 1973 and 6 September–6 October 1975
- 49th Operations Group, 15 November 1991 – 16 May 2008 – 15 July 2011
- 49th Operations Group, 25 September 2009 – 15 July 2011
- 54th Fighter Group, c. 4 August 2017 – present

=== Stations ===
- Selfridge Field, Michigan, 15 January 1941
- Morrison Field, Florida, c. 23 May 1941 – 4 January 1942
- Essendon Airport, Melbourne, Australia, 2 Feb 1942
- RAAF Base Fairbairn, Canberra, Australia, 16 Feb 1942
- RAAF Base Darwin, Darwin, Australia, 17 April 1942
- Schwimmer Airfield (14 Mile Drome), Port Moresby, New Guinea, 25 September 1942
- Dobodura Airfield Complex, Dobodura, New Guinea, 15 April 1943
- Tsili Tsili Airfield, New Guinea, 30 Aug 1943
- Gusap Airfield, New Guinea, c. 29 Oct 1943
- Hollandia Airfield Complex, New Guinea, 3 May 1944
- Mokmer Airfield, Biak, Netherlands East Indies, 23 Jun 1944
- Tacloban Airfield, Leyte, Philippines, 25 Oct 1944
- McGuire Field, San Jose, Mindoro, Philippines, 2 Jan 1945
- Lingayen Airfield, Luzon, Philippines, 27 Feb 1945
- Okinawa, 17 Aug 1945
- Atsugi Airfield, Japan, 15 Sep 1945
- Chitose Air Base, Japan, c. 20 Feb 1946
- Misawa Air Base, Japan, 2 Apr 1948
- Ashiya AB, Japan, 30 Jun 1950
- Itazuke AB, Japan, 8 Jul 1950
- Taegu AB (K-2), South Korea, 29 Sep 1950
- Kunsan AB (K-8), South Korea, 1 Apr 1953
- Misawa Air Base, Japan, 4 Nov 1953 – 10 Dec 1957
- Étain-Rouvres Air Base, France, 10 Dec 1957
- Spangdahlem Air Base, West Germany, 25 Aug 1959 – 15 Jul 1968
- Holloman AForce Base, New Mexico, 15 Jul 1968–16 May 2008; 25 Sept 2009 – 15 July 2011; 4 Aug 2017 – present

Deployed to: Ramstein AB, West Germany, c. 12 Sep-c. 11 Oct 1970 and 10 Sep – 6 Oct 1971
Deployed to: Takhli RTAFB, Thailand, 12 May – 4 Oct 1972
Deployed to: Hahn AB, Germany, 3 Mar – 5 Apr 1973 and 5 Sep – 6 Oct 1975
Deployed to: Ramstein AB, West Germany, 21 September – 20 October 1976 and 22 Aug – 22 Sep 1977

=== Aircraft ===
- Seversky P-35, 1941
- Curtiss P-40 Warhawk, 1942–1944
- Republic P-47 Thunderbolt, 1943–1944
- Lockheed P-38 Lightning, 1944–1946
- North American P-51 Mustang, 1946–1949, 1950
- Lockheed F-80 Shooting Star, 1948–1951
- Republic F-84 Thunderjet, 1951–1957
- North American F-100 Super Sabre, 1957–1962
- Republic F-105D Thunderchief, 1962–1967
- Republic F-105F Thunderchief, 1962–1967
- McDonnell F-4D Phantom II, 1967–1978
- McDonnell Douglas F-15A Eagle, 1978–1992
- McDonnell Douglas F-15B Eagle, 1978–1992
- Northrop T-38 Talon, 1992–2008
- Lockheed F-117A Nighthawk, 1992–2008
- Lockheed Martin F-22A Raptor, 2009-2011
- General Dynamics F-16C Fighting Falcon, 2017–present
