= Karl Aschenbrenner =

American philosopher

- Born: Karl Aschenbrenner; November 20, 1911; Bison, Kansas
- Died: July 4, 1988 (aged 76); Budapest, Hungary
- Education: University of California, Berkeley
- Occupations: American philosopher; author; editor; translator

Karl W. Aschenbrenner (November 20, 1911, in Bison, Kansas – July 4, 1988, in Budapest, Hungary) was an American philosopher, translator (into English of works in Latin and German) and prominent American specialist in analytic philosophy and aesthetics, author and editor of more than 48 publications including five monographs, 27 articles and 16 book reviews. His principal academic post was at the University of California, Berkeley in the Department of Philosophy. Aschenbrenner co-edited, with Arnold Isenberg, a collection of essays on the subject of aesthetic theory. As co-translator with William B. Holther, Aschenbrenner published the principal work of Alexander Gottlieb Baumgarten and, with Donald Nicholl, assisted in completing the second edition of an important work of the Polish philosopher Joseph M. Bocheński. He is particularly noted for his authoritative commentary on the Kritik der Reinen Vernunft of Immanuel Kant as well as the commentary he and Nicholl supplied in their translation of Baumgarten's "Meditationes philosophicae de nonnullis ad poema pertinentibus" introducing that work. Except for his sabbaticals, Aschenbrenner resided in Berkeley, California from 1943 to 1986 and in Los Angeles from 1986 to 1988. During sabbatical leaves Aschenbrenner taught at the Universität Wien, University College London and the Ludwig-Maximilians-Universität München. He remained Professor Emeritus at the University of California at Berkeley until his death in 1988. Aschenbrenner died in Budapest while doing research and is buried in Farkasréti Cemetery in that city. The Aschenbrenner papers are held by the Doe Library of the University of California at Berkeley.

== Career ==
According to the notice posted at "In Memoriam", a site maintained by the Academic Senate of the University of California, Aschenbrenner was descended from Volga Germans immigrants to Kansas. Aschenbrenner was born November 20, 1911, in Bison, Rush County, in that state. His upbringing was in Portland, Oregon. He obtained his undergraduate education at Reed College (1934). He was awarded his M.A. (1938) and PhD degrees (1940) at Berkeley. He served an instructor at Reed College for two years, then as a meteorologist lieutenant in the United States Naval Reserve from 1943 to 1946. He served as a flight instructor at St. Mary's College in Moraga, California (1942–1946), after which he joined the faculty of the Speech Department at the University of California at Berkeley. In 1948 he obtained his appointment as assistant professor in the Philosophy Department. "His teaching was mainly in aesthetics and the history of philosophy, notably the Kant course," according to the "In Memoriam" notice. His principal instructor was Jacob Loewenberg, the leading Kantian at Berkeley and department chair (1935–1941) while Aschenbrenner was studying for his doctorate. Aschenbrenner was active in founding the Journal of the History of Philosophy, on whose board of directors he served for 27 years. He was the recipient of Guggenheim, Fulbright, and NEH fellowships. Aschenbrenner undertook the study of Magyar, the Hungarian language, to test his theories in the context of a language which was not Indo-European spoken by people of European culture. His article The Appraisive Function of Hungarian Verbs in -kodik, -kedik and –ködik (cited below) is based on his researches. The "In Memoriam" notice remarks: "Whereas Indo-European languages express appraisals almost entirely by the use of special vocabularies, Magyar possesses verb endings that contribute a crediting or pejorative sense to the resulting compound. Thus Magyar speakers think of some evaluative notions as modalities of descriptive concepts rather than as a distinct family." Aschenbrenner served as department head on two occasions at Berkeley, first as the chairman of the Department of Philosophy at Dwinelle Hall (1957–1962) and later as the chairman of the Department of Design at Wurster Hall (1964–1965); his service in the latter capacity has been documented in the Centennial Record, maintained by Calisphere, a service of the libraries of the University of California.

== Publications ==
George Boas, in a review published in 1955 in Modern Language Notes remarks, regarding the Aschenbrenner-Holther translation of Baumgarten's Reflections on Poetry: "The editors, whose introduction is in many ways admirable, particularly in that it makes a reading of Baumgarten's own work superfluous." Irving Singer, in a review published in 1955 in The Philosophical Review commented on the same work. "Mssrs. Aschenbrenner and Holther are to be commended for making available a work which has been neglected for many years." Receiving favourable notice at the time of publication, with reviews in German, Dutch and Spanish journals, were Aschenbrenner's three major works in the field of analytic philosophy which should be treated as a precursor to today's computer-aided content analysis. These were Concepts of Value, (1971) Concepts of Criticism (1974) and Analysis of Appraisive Characterization (1983). Aschenbrenner's death was noted by J. Maeyaert in the Journal for Philosophy (Dutch: Tijdschrift voor Filosofie): "His teaching was especially devoted to the aesthetics and the history of philosophy." Antonio Cua in Philosophy East and West referred readers to Concepts of Value: "For an illuminating discussion of appraisive creativity in general." Aschenbrenner's works appear in 113 publications and are held in the collections of 2,371 library holdings according to WorldCat Identities page; link below. Excluding translations of previously published works, Aschenbrenner's works appear in English (48), Polish (3), German (2), French (2), Spanish, Italian, Modern Greek and Romanian (1 each). Aschenbrenner's papers have been deposited in the Doe Library at the University of California at Berkeley.

== Family ==
Aschenbrenner married Margaret Marie Kerr, also a Reed College graduate, in 1937 at the Page Street Baptist Church, San Francisco. They were the parents of Lisbeth Aschenbrenner, attorney, Peter J. Aschenbrenner, historian, and John N. Aschenbrenner, composer.

== Selected bibliography ==
- The Concepts of Value: Foundations of Value Theory (vol. 12 of Foundations of Language: Supplementary Series), Dordrecht, Netherlands: D. Reidel Publishing Company, 1971. ISBN 9789027701855.
- The Concepts of Criticism (vol. 20 of Foundations of Language: Supplementary Series), Dordrecht, Netherlands: D. Reidel Publishing Company, 1974. ISBN 9789027704825.
- A Companion to Kant's Critique of Pure Reason: Transcendental Aesthetic and Analytic New York: University Press of America, 1983; Lanham: London: University Press of America, c. 1983. ISBN 9780819132307.
- Analysis of Appraisive Characterization, Dordrecht, Netherlands: D.Reidel Publishing Company, 1983. ISBN 9789027714527.
- The Concept of Coherence in Art, Dordrecht, Netherlands: D. Reidel Publishing Company, 1983. ISBN 9789401088527.
- Aesthetic Theories: Studies in the Philosophy of Art, Englewood Cliffs, NJ: Prentice-Hall, Inc., 1965, Karl Aschenbrenner and Arnold Isenberg, eds.
- Moritz Schlick, Essays: The Future of Philosophy; a New Philosophy of Experience, Berkeley, CA: University of California, 1951, Karl Aschenbrenner, ed. with others.
- George Berkeley, Lectures Delivered before the Philosophical Union of the University of California, Berkeley, CA: University of California Press, 1957. Co-editors including Stephen C. Pepper and Benson Mates.

== See also ==
- Jacob Loewenberg
- Benson Mates
- David Rynin
- Joseph Tussman
- Edward Strong
- John Searle
- Paul Feyerabend
- Joseph Kerman
- Stephen C. Pepper
- Stanley Cavell
- Barry Stroud
