= Benson Mates =

American philosopher (1919–2009)

Benson Mates (May 19, 1919 in Portland, Oregon – May 14, 2009 in Berkeley, California) was an American philosopher at the University of California, Berkeley, noted for his work in logic, the history of philosophy, and skepticism.

== Education and career ==
Mates studied philosophy and mathematics at the University of Oregon, Cornell University, and the University of California at Berkeley. Some of his teachers included J. Barkley Rosser, Harold Cherniss, and Alfred Tarski. From 1948 until his retirement in 1989, he was a professor of philosophy at Berkeley. He remained Professor Emeritus of philosophy at University of California at Berkeley until his death.

== Philosophical work ==
Mates's 1948 dissertation, "On the Logic of the Old Stoa", formed the basis for his 1953 book Stoic Logic, of which Peter Geach wrote, "Stoic logic is a difficult subject [...] Dr. Mates's monograph is a strenuous and successful effort to overcome these difficulties." Mates's 1965 book, Elementary Logic, remains a widely used introductory textbook in symbolic logic. His 1986 study of Leibniz is also highly regarded.

In his own philosophical work, Mates defends a stance akin to Pyrrhonian skepticism. He argues that the major problems of philosophy (such as the liar paradox, the existence of an external world, and free will) are intelligible and non-trivial yet utterly defy solution. Unlike the classical Pyrrhonists, however, Mates finds that skeptical arguments lead to unsatisfactory perplexity rather than ataraxia.

== Books ==
- Stoic Logic, Berkeley: University of California Press, 1953 (second revised edition 1961).
- Elementary Logic, 1965, second edition New York: Oxford University Press, 1972.
- Skeptical Essays, Chicago: University of Chicago Press, 1981.
- The Philosophy of Leibniz. Metaphysics and Language, New York: Oxford University Press, 1986.
- The Skeptic Way: Sextus Empiricus's Outlines of Pyrrhonism, Oxford: Oxford University Press, 1996.

== See also ==
- American philosophy
- List of American philosophers
- Karl W. Aschenbrenner
