= Robert W. Aschenbrener =

American World War II flying ace

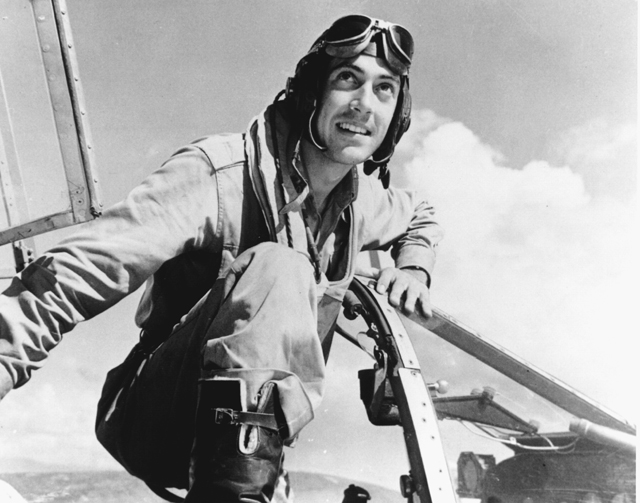
- Captain Robert W. Aschenbrener in 1944
- Born: November 22, 1920; Fifield, Wisconsin, U.S.
- Died: July 2, 2009 (aged 88); Sacramento, California, U.S.
- Military career
- Allegiance: United States
- Branch: United States Army Air Forces
- Service years: 1942–1945
- Rank: Major
- Nickname: Asch
- Unit: 8th Fighter Squadron
- Commands: 7th Fighter Squadron
- Conflicts: World War II
- Awards: Distinguished Service Cross; Distinguished Flying Cross (3); Purple Heart; Air Medal (10)

Robert Wayne Aschenbrener (November 22, 1920 – July 2, 2009) was an American fighter pilot and flying ace of World War II.

== Early life ==
He was raised on the Indian reservation at Lac du Flambeau, Wisconsin. He attended Loras College in Dubuque, Iowa, for two years before enlisting in the Army Air Corps in September 1941.

== World War II ==
Aschenbrener received flight training at Kelly, Ballinger, San Angelo, and Moore Fields in Texas, and graduated with the class of 42H. Lieutenant Aschenbrener was assigned to the 8th Fighter Squadron (Black Sheep Squadron), 49th Fighter Group, then based in New Guinea. Flying the Curtiss P-40 Warhawk, he scored his first two victories on November 15, 1943, followed by another on February 15, 1944. Promoted to captain, he became operations officer and flew 272 combat missions before returning to the United States in the summer of 1944 to instruct other pilots in fighter tactics.

Wishing to return to combat, "Asch" (as he was nicknamed) wrangled a trip back to his old unit, now in the Philippines flying the Lockheed P-38 Lightning. Serving again as operations officer, he became an ace on November 24, 1944, when he downed three Kawasaki Ki-61s ("Tony"s) and one Mitsubishi A6M Zero ("Zeke") in one day. On December 11 and 14, 1944, he was credited with his ninth and tenth victories.

Major Aschenbrener's P-38

On Christmas Day 1944, during a strafing run on enemy occupied Clark Field, Aschenbrener's P-38 was hit by 20mm ground fire, and he crashed into a rice paddy barely 5 miles (8.0 km) from the end of the runway. Picked up by Hukbalahap guerrillas, he hid in the jungle for nearly a month evading enemy troops on the lookout for him. He was joined by the crew of a Navy torpedo plane, as well as downed F-6F Hellcat ace Alexander Vraciu. Making it back to safety after 27 days, he returned to his unit, where he was promoted to major and assumed command of the 7th Fighter Squadron, 49th Fighter Group.

At this time, he met his soon to be wife, Laura Ann Middleton. They were married on recaptured Clark Air Base on August 20, 1945, in the shadow of Mount Pinatubo (a volcano which eventually destroyed the base) just a few miles from where his plane went down.

Before leaving the Army Air Force, Major Aschenbrener flew 345 combat missions and over 850 combat hours flying the P-40, P-47, and P-38 fighter aircraft.

== Post-war ==
Major Aschenbrener returned to the United States in September 1945 and left the service to pursue a degree in journalism at the University of Missouri. After retiring from the Los Angeles Valley News, he and Ann moved to Cameron Park in northern California.

Aschenbrener died July 2, 2009, at the age of 88 in Sacramento, California, leaving behind eight children and over 30 grandchildren and great grandchildren.

== Honors and awards ==
Major Aschenbrener earned the title "double ace" and received a total of 21 medals and citations, including:

USAAF Pilot Badge
Distinguished Service Cross	Distinguished Flying Cross with two bronze oak leaf clusters	Purple Heart
Air Medal with one silver and three bronze oak leaf clusters	Air Medal (second ribbon required for accouterment spacing)	American Campaign Medal
Asiatic-Pacific Campaign Medal with four bronze campaign stars	World War II Victory Medal	Philippine Liberation Medal with two service stars

Army Presidential Unit Citation with two bronze oak leaf clusters	Philippine Republic Presidential Unit Citation

His Distinguished Service Cross Citation reads:

For extraordinary heroism in connection with military operations against an armed enemy while serving as Pilot of a P-38 Fighter Airplane in the 8th Fighter Squadron, 49th Fighter Group, FIFTH Air Force, in aerial combat against enemy forces on 24 November 1944, over the Philippine Islands. On this day Captain Aschenbrener shot down FOUR enemy aircraft in a single mission. His unquestionable valor in aerial combat is in keeping with the highest traditions of the military service and reflects great credit upon himself, the 5th Air Force, and the United States Army Air Forces.
