= Rolf Alfons Aschenbrenner =

German engineer

- Born: c.1964 (age 61–62)
- Occupation: Mechanical engineer

Academic background
- Education: University of Giessen

Academic work
- Discipline: Mechanical engineering
- Sub-discipline: Electronic packaging; microelectronic packaging
- Institutions: Technische Universität Berlin; Fraunhofer IZM (since 1994– )

Rolf Alfons Aschenbrenner (born c. 1964) is an engineer who works for Fraunhofer IZM in Berlin, Germany. He was named a Fellow of the Institute of Electrical and Electronics Engineers (IEEE) in 2013 "for contributions to microelectronic packaging".

== Biography ==
In 1986, Aschenbrenner received a Bachelor of Science degree in mechanical engineering from the University of Giessen, followed in 1991 by a Master of Science degree in physics from the same university. He then worked at the university until 1992 during which he helped with a project for Spacelab mission D2. In 1993, Aschenbrenner worked at Technische Universität Berlin before joining Fraunhofer in March 1994.

In October 2010, Aschenbrenner was appointed as deputy head of Fraunhofer IZM, where he coheaded its System Integration and Interconnection Technologies department. He is a senior member of IEEE and has supported its Components, Packaging, & Manufacturing Technology (CPMT) Society, working in multiple committees and serving in two vice presidential positions. Aschenbrenner became CPMT president in January 2010 and served until December 2011. In 2017, CPMT changed its name to the Electronics Packaging Society (EPS).

Aschenbrenner has written or contributed to more than 100 journal and proceedings articles on electronic packaging, and has more than 14 patents related to microelectronic packaging. He received a "best paper award" at a 1995 conference and an international recognition award in 2005 from an electronics manufacturers R&D consortium.
