= Peter J. Aschenbrenner =

American historian (born 1945)

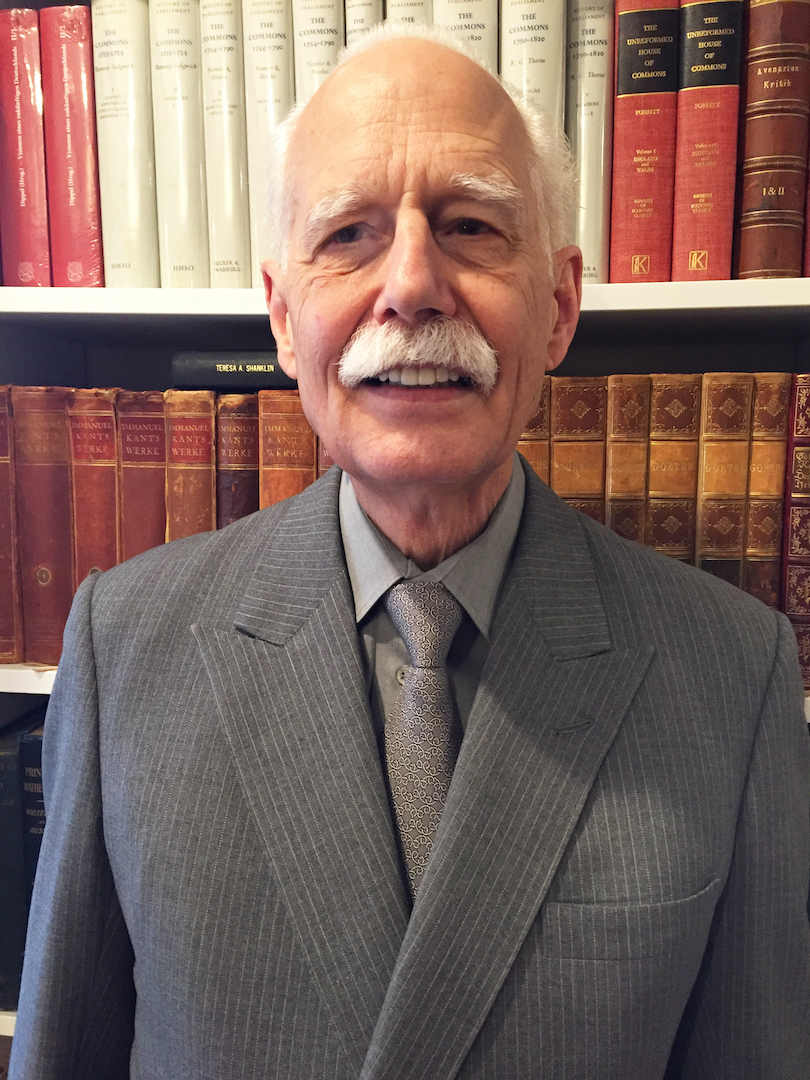
- Aschenbrenner in 2021
- Born: 1945 (age 80–81); Oakland, California, U.S.
- Education: UC Berkeley School of Law, University of Wisconsin at Madison
- Occupations: Historian, lawyer
- Website: www.peterjaschenbrenner.com

Peter J. Aschenbrenner is a lawyer and historian working in the area of the parliamentary procedure of the 18th century. He is a fellow of the Royal Historical Society and the US National Convenor for the International Commission for the History of Representative and Parliamentary Institutions. Aschenbrenner's research interests include mathematical modelling of the behavior of members of the Parliament of the United Kingdom and the United States Congress.

== Career ==
Born in Oakland, California, Aschenbrenner received his BA from the University of Wisconsin at Madison in 1968 and his JD from Berkeley Law in 1971. At Berkeley Aschenbrenner published "State Power and the Indian Treaty Right to Fish" in the California Law Review, of which he was an editor. Later, Anthony Kennedy, who was at the time serving on the Ninth Circuit Court of Appeals, cited Aschenbrenner's essay in two appellate decisions. As an attorney at the Native American Rights Fund in Boulder, Colorado from 1971 to 1972, Aschenbrenner was responsible for compiling a registry of Indian law. This registry became NARF's The General Index to Indian Law, which included over 380 legal subject headings.

Aschenbrenner then moved to Alaska, where he would base his legal practice and professional life for the next 39 years. Aschenbrenner served as a United States magistrate judge from 1974 to 1991 in the District of Alaska, during which time he was reappointed for a fifth term. The Governor of Alaska twice appointed Aschenbrenner to serve as a commissioner on the Alaska Judicial Conduct Commission, which reviews charges of judicial misconduct and makes recommendations regarding disqualification, suspension, removal, retirement and discipline of members of the Alaska state judges. Aschenbrenner served on the commission from 2004 to 2012.

In 2017 Aschenbrenner published British and American Foundings of Parliamentary Science, 1774–1801, a study of the contributions of John Hatsell, Thomas Jefferson and Jeremy Bentham to parliamentary science. In 2020, with co-editor Colin Lee, managing director of the Select Committee Team, UK House of Commons, Aschenbrenner edited The Papers of John Hatsell, Clerk of the House of Commons, which Cambridge University Press published as volume 59 of the Camden Fifth Series for the Royal Historical Society. The volume includes 137 letters of John Hatsell and Hatsell's personal diary, which he titled his "Memorabilia," now held at the Huntington Library in San Marino, California. Aschenbrenner lectured on the subject "British and American Foundings of Parliamentary Science" at the invitation of the curators of the Rare Book Room, Library of Congress in Washington, D.C. Aschenbrenner's second monograph "James Monroe, John Marshall and ‘The Excellence of Our Institutions'" explores the contributions of James Monroe and John Marshall to the method of Congressional precedents.

In 2018, the Direction of the International Commission of the History of Representative and Parliamentary Institutions elected Aschenbrenner the National Convenor for the United States. He arranged for the International Commission to become associated with the American Historical Association as an affiliated society. In 2020 the Royal Historical Society named him a Fellow of that organization. Aschenbrenner is the father of Teresa Shanklin, Aaron J. K. Aschenbrenner, Nathanael A. B. Aschenbrenner and Benjamin I. D. Aschenbrenner. His father is Karl W. Aschenbrenner.
