= Donald Nicholl =

British historian and theologian (1923–1997)

Donald Nicholl (23 July 1923 – 3 May 1997) was a British historian and theologian. A speaker of medieval Welsh, Irish and Russian, he published books on medieval and modern history, religion and a biography of Thurstan. He has been regarded as "one of the most influential of modern Christian thinkers".

== Life ==
Nicholl was born on 23 July 1923 into a poor working-class community in Halifax, West Yorkshire. He was the son of a brass finisher, William Nicholl. Academically able, he won a Brackenbury scholarship to Balliol College, Oxford, where he studied political philosophy under A. D. Lindsay and was tutored in medieval history by Maurice Powicke.

He left Oxford after a year to serve in the British Army in World War II. He served in the ranks of the infantry, then in intelligence, largely in Asia and the subcontinent. Upon his return to Oxford in 1946, he converted to Catholicism as a result of his wartime experiences. Ida Friederike Görres and Edith Stein played a role in influencing his conversion.

From January 1948 until 1953, Nicholl taught history at the University of Edinburgh. In 1953 he moved to the University College of North Staffordshire (later Keele University), where he taught for over 20 years, being promoted to a professorship in 1972. In 1974 he left the UK to become professor of religious studies and history at the University of California, Santa Cruz, where, for three years he chaired the religious studies department. He returned to England with his wife in 1980, but was appointed rector of the Tantur Ecumenical Institute for Theological Studies in Jerusalem from 1981 to 1985. He retired to Betley, near Keele in Staffordshire, becoming senior research fellow at the Multi-Faith Centre, Selly Oak Colleges, Birmingham, and continuing to write.

In addition to his academic pursuits, Nicholl taught church history to the Poor Clares in Aptos, California, and to novices in the Missionaries of Charity, Mother Teresa's order, in London. More informally he conducted a class in the "Penny University" at the Caffe Pergolesi in Santa Cruz, reading through Dostoevsky's The Brothers Karamazov.

Alongside his wife, Dorothy Nicholl, he was active in the co-workers of Mother Teresa. He was regular contributor to The Tablet.

Nicholl died of cancer, at his home in Betley, on 3 May 1997. He is buried in Keele churchyard.

== Selected works ==
- Recent Thought in Focus (1952)
- Thurstan (1964), biography of Archbishop Thurstan of York
- Holiness (Seabury, 1981; Pauline Books & Media, 2005)
- Triumphs of the Spirit in Russia (Darton, Longman and Todd, 1997)
- Talking with St. Seraphim: A Meditation with St. Seraphim Shared in the Context of the St Theosevia Centre for Christian Spirituality, March 1992 (1997)
- The Beatitude of Truth: Reflections of a Lifetime (Darton, Longman and Todd, 1997) – published posthumously
- The Testing of Hearts (Darton, Longman and Todd, 1998) – published posthumously
