= Christian Heinrich Aschenbrenner =

Christian Heinrich Aschenbrenner (29 December 1654 – 13 December 1732) was a German violinist and composer. He played in court orchestras in Germany, and later was director (Capellmeister) of them.

== Life ==
He was born in Stettin (now Szczecin in Poland). His father, a musician, gave him early music lessons. From 1668 he studied composition with Johann Theile, and in 1676 he went to Vienna to study composition and the violin with Johann Heinrich Schmelzer.

From 1677 he was in the court orchestra at Zeitz, until the orchestra was dissolved in 1681 on the death of Maurice, Duke of Saxe-Zeitz. Johann Rosenmüller, director of the court orchestra of Anthony Ulrich, Duke of Brunswick at Wolfenbüttel, then obtained a position for him there, but Rosenmüller's death soon afterwards caused the duke to lose interest in reorganizing the orchestra, so Aschenbrenner again had no permanent position.

In 1683 he became lead violinist of the court orchestra at Merseburg, and in 1695 returned to Zeitz, as director of the court orchestra. During this time he made concert tours and became well known; in 1692 he played in Vienna before the emperor, to whom he presented six violin sonatas, and he visited again in 1703. In 1713 he became director of the court orchestra of Moritz Wilhelm, Duke of Saxe-Zeitz at Merseburg, remaining in the service of the orchestra at Zeitz, to play or conduct there on special occasions. Aschenbrenner left the Merseburg court in 1719, and retired with a small pension to Jena, where he died in 1732.

== Works ==
"Gast- und Hochzeits-Freude, bestehend in Sonaten, Präludien, Allemanden, Couranten, Balletten, Arien, Sarabanten" ("Enjoyment with guests and at weddings, consisting of sonatas, preludes, allemandes, courantes, ballets, arias, sarabandes") in 3 to 6 parts, was published in 1673, and was reprinted in 1675 and 1676.

It is not known whether the violin sonatas presented to the emperor in 1692 were printed.
