= Calapan =

Capital city of Oriental Mindoro, Philippines

- Component city
- City of Calapan
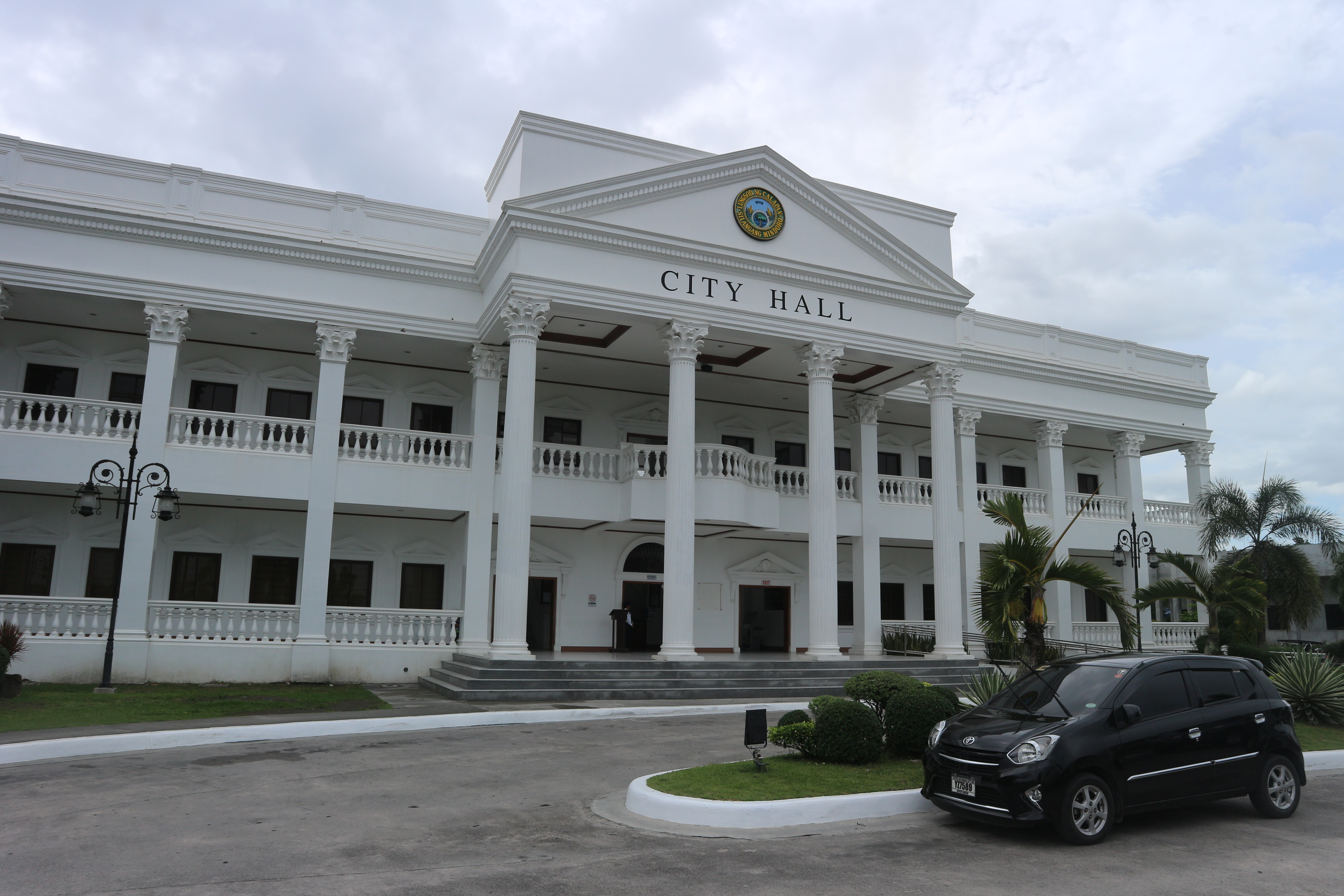
- Calapan City Hall

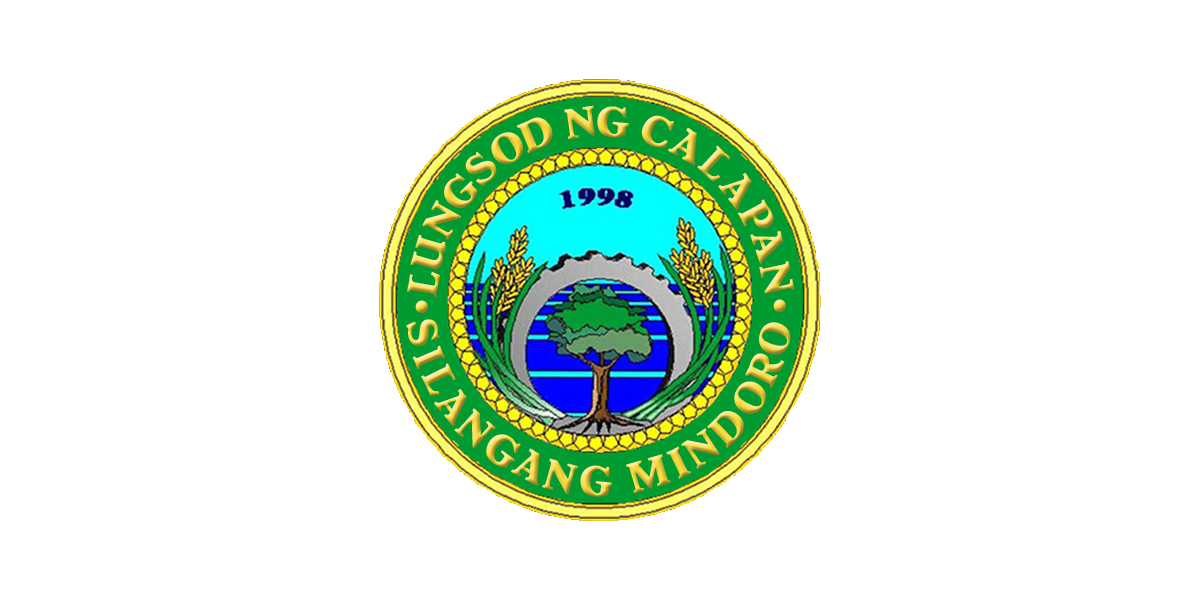
- Flag Seal
- Nickname: Gateway to the Golden Isle · Golden Grains City
- Map of Oriental Mindoro with Calapan highlighted
- Interactive map of Calapan
- Location within the Philippines
- Coordinates: 13°24′50″N 121°10′48″E
- Country: Philippines
- Region: Mimaropa
- Province: Oriental Mindoro
- District: 1st district
- Founded: January 2, 1917
- Cityhood: March 21, 1998
- Barangays: 62 (see Barangays)

Government
  - Type: Sangguniang Panlungsod
  - Mayor: Paulino Salvador Leachon
  - Vice Mayor: Rommel Rodolfo A. Ignacio
  - Representative: Arnan C. Panaligan
  - City Council: Members: Charles O. Pansoy; Rius Anthony C. Agua; Marian Teresa G. Tagupa; Rafael E. Panaligan Jr.; Genie R. Fortu; Ronalee E. Leachon; Ricka Marie P. Goco; Federico A. Cabailo Jr.; Jelina Maree D. Magsuci; Roberto L. Concepcion
  - Electorate: 96,310 voters (2025)

Area
  - Total: 250.06 km^{2} (96.55 sq mi)
- Elevation: 87 m (285 ft)
- Highest elevation: 2,576 m (8,451 ft)
- Lowest elevation: 0 m (0 ft)

Population (2024 census)
  - Total: 148,558
  - Density: 594.09/km^{2} (1,538.7/sq mi)
  - Households: 35,147
- Demonym: Calapeño/a

Economy
  - Income class: 2nd city income class
  - Poverty incidence: 6.18% (2023)
  - Revenue: ₱ 1,448 million (2024)
  - Assets: ₱ 2,484 million (2024)
  - Expenditure: ₱1,236 Million (2022)
  - Liabilities: ₱ 817.1 million (2024)

Service provider
  - Electricity: Oriental Mindoro Electric Cooperative (ORMECO)
- Time zone: UTC+8 (PST)
- ZIP code: 5200
- PSGC: 1705205000
- IDD : area code: +63 (0)43
- Native languages: Tagalog
- Website: www.cityofcalapan.gov.ph

Calapan, officially the City of Calapan (Filipino: Lungsod ng Calapan), is a component city and the capital of the province of Oriental Mindoro, Philippines. According to the 2024 census, it has a population of 148,558 people, making it the most populous settlement in the entire island of Mindoro.

Calapan is the regional and administrative center of the MIMAROPA region as well as its second largest city in the region, after Puerto Princesa in Palawan. It is the only city on the island of Mindoro and one of only two cities in MIMAROPA.

The city also serves as the primary center of commerce, industry, transportation, communication, religious activities, and education in the province of Oriental Mindoro.

The city serves as a primary gateway to Oriental Mindoro, a role enhanced by the Strong Republic Nautical Highway (SRNH) network. Its main maritime hub, the Port of Calapan, is the busiest seaport on Mindoro Island and is located 45 minutes to 3 hours from the Batangas International Port via ferry or roll-on/roll-off (RORO) vessels. Additionally, the port features the largest passenger terminal building in the Philippines and records the highest passenger volume in the region, catering to millions of travelers annually.

== Etymology ==
The derivation of the name of Calapan cannot be traced with certainty.

Some have suggested that it comes from the word “Kalap,” meaning to gather logs, implying that “Kalapan” was a place where logs were collected. However, historical records do not mention Calapan as a center for logging, and the town’s swampy environment would not have supported the growth of large forest trees suitable for timber.

Another theory states that Calapan was originally pronounced “Kalapang,” which, according to an old Tagalog dictionary, is a synonym for “sanga” (branch) or “a part of anything.” This could refer either to the settlement being a branch of its mother town, Baco, or to the peninsula where the Calapan seaport, airport, and the barangays of Lazareto and San Antonio are now located.

== History ==
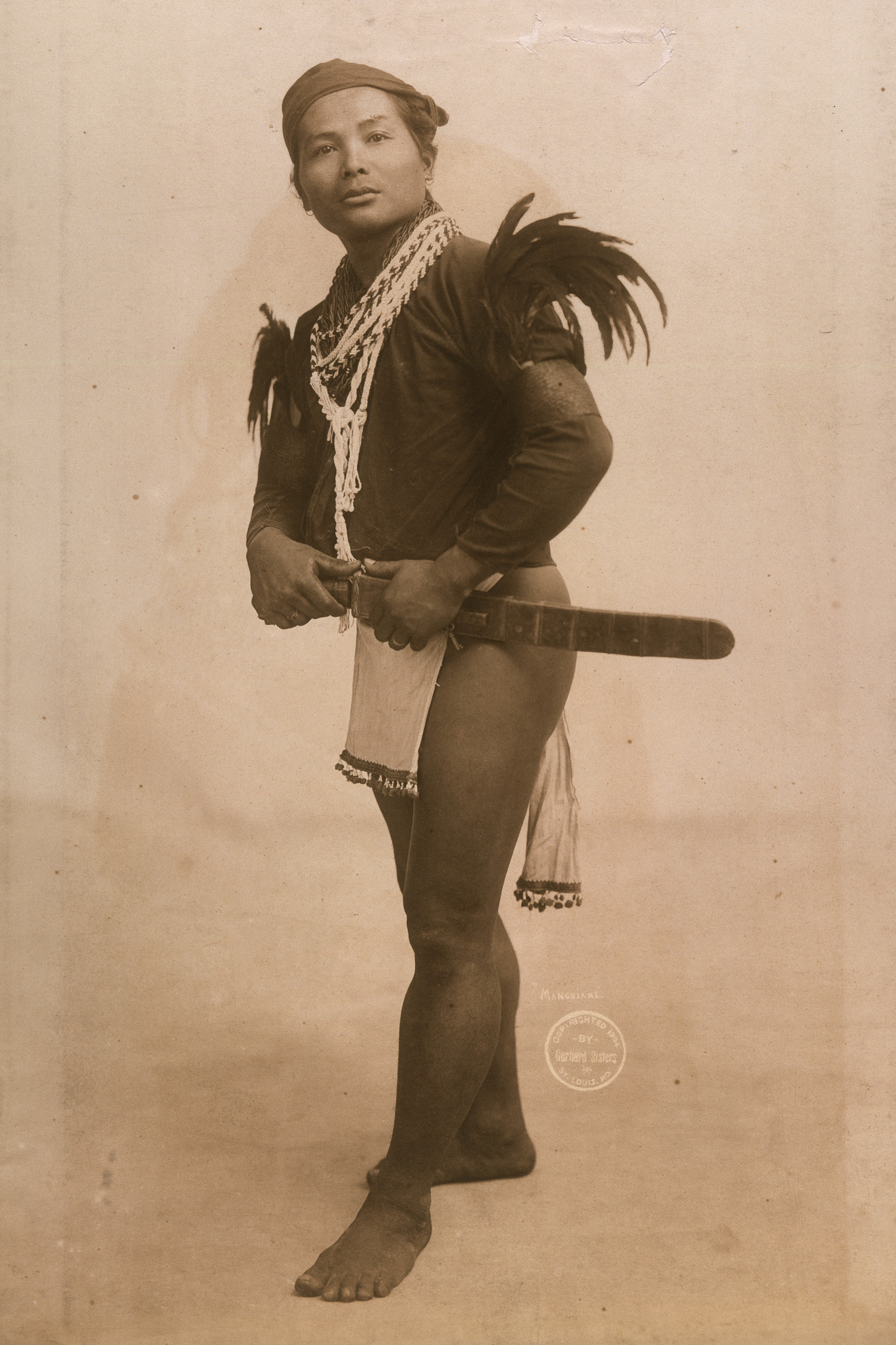
A Mangyan man in traditional attire (Taken during the 1904 World's Fair)

=== Early History ===
Prior to Spanish colonization, the island of Mindoro was inhabited by the Mangyan people, one of the earliest indigenous groups in the Philippines.

The island also functioned as a regional trading hub, with Chinese merchants documented to have engaged with local communities as early as the 10th century. This interaction is often associated with trade between the pre-colonial polity of Ma-i and merchants from what is now Guangdong in southern China. The precise location of Ma-i remains a subject of scholarly debate.

With the expansion of Spanish colonial authority, segments of the indigenous population relocated from coastal settlements, including areas corresponding to present-day Calapan, to the interior highlands. This movement is generally understood as a response to colonial intrusion and the increasing pressures of external settlement and control.

=== Spanish Colonial Period ===
Calapan was formerly a small village before the establishment of the first Religious District in Baco. The District convent was transferred to Calapan in 1733 and began its jurisdiction over the Northern Mindoro Ecclesiastical Area.

The town’s poblacion, or town center, was originally located slightly inland in what is now known as Lumangbayan, meaning “old town.” Presumably due to pirate raids in 1753-1754, the poblacion was later relocated to its present site along the coast of Calapan Bay.

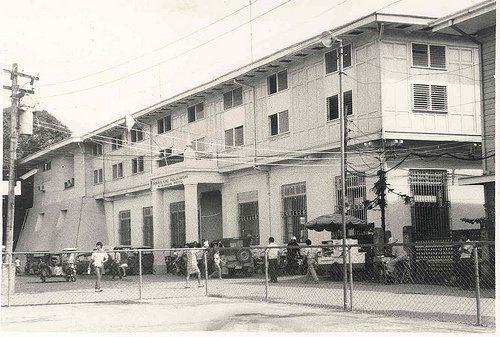
The old provincial capitol of Oriental Mindoro, with the facade of the historic fort visible on the left side of the photo.

During the early 18th century, the town occupied a narrow strip of land extending from Ibaba to Ilaya, laid out in a cross-shape facing the present Santo Niño Cathedral and divided by a river. Over time, additional barrios were established to accommodate the growing settlement.

At Ibaba, Augustinian Recollects constructed a church fortified with walls and watchtowers to protect the settlement from attacks from the south. Although the church was rebuilt in concrete at around the 1940s, remnants of the original fortifications, locally known as a kuta, are still visible in what is now the Oriental Mindoro Heritage Museum.

In 1837, the capital of the province was moved from Puerto Galera to Calapan. The 1800s census showed that Calapan had 979 native families and 8 Spanish-Filipino families.

Inspired by an earlier movement led by Juan Naguit of Cavite, in which a group of Filipinos attacked the church of Sucol (present-day Bongabong) during Mass on 22 May 1898, hundreds of Mindoreños—including migrants from Cavite and Batangas as well as members of the local elite—took up arms across the island.

In early June 1898, approximately 1,000 revolutionaries launched an assault on the provincial capital of Calapan, but the initial attack was repelled by Spanish forces. The revolutionaries succeeded only after the arrival of over 1,000 additional insurgents under Colonel Alfonso Panopio from Batangas, who joined forces with the local Mindoro fighters. On 1 July 1898, Governor Rafael Morales formally surrendered, and a revolutionary government was promptly established in Mindoro.

=== American Colonial Period ===
The occupation of the Philippines by American forces following the defeat of the Spanish government in Manila brought significant political, economic, and social changes to the island of Mindoro and to the city of Calapan.

The occupation of Calapan by American forces began in earnest on 15 July 1901, when seventy U.S. soldiers disembarked near the town and took control with minimal resistance. During this initial occupation, several houses were burned, some residents were wounded, and twenty-five Filipinos were killed. According to the diary of Pedro del Rosario, a local schoolteacher at the time, some victims were forced into the river in groups and shot. After this expedition, the Americans returned to Batangas.

A second, larger expedition commenced on 27 July 1901, with 800 U.S. soldiers under the command of Major Evans tasked with occupying Mindoro permanently. The mission also included an objective to capture or neutralize Arthur Howard, an American deserter believed responsible for the death of U.S. General Lawton in December 1900; however, this objective was not achieved, as Howard and Provincial Governor Ramon Atienza evaded capture by retreating to the forests.

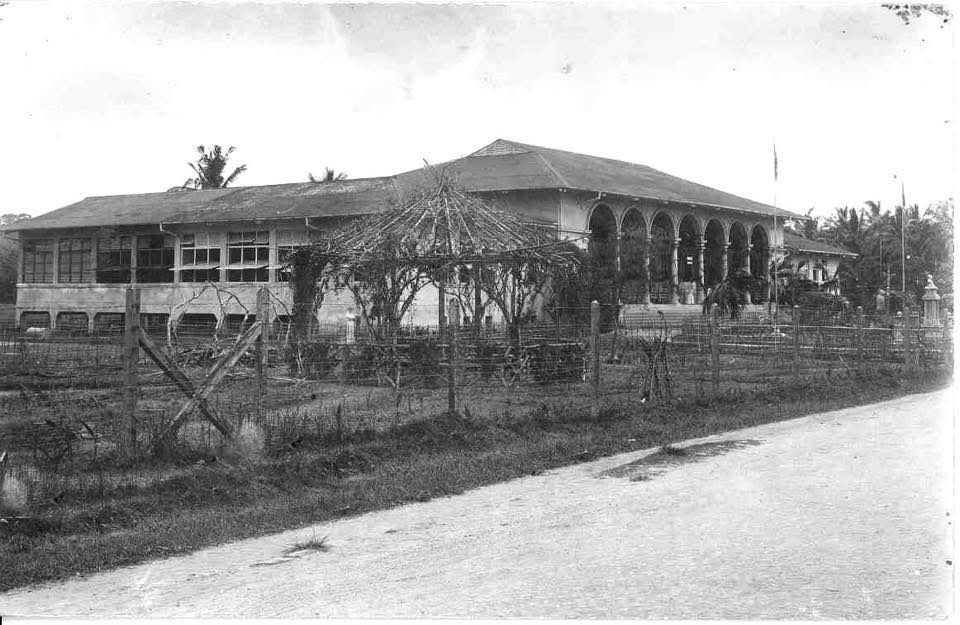
The Mindoro High School set-up during the US Occupation (now known as the Oriental Mindoro National High School)

On 29 July 1901, Calapan was formally occupied by U.S. forces. Major Evans subsequently established a municipal government composed of Filipinos willing to collaborate. Pursuit operations against remaining Filipino soldiers were largely unsuccessful due to the swampy terrain near Lake Naujan, which provided a strategic advantage to the defenders.

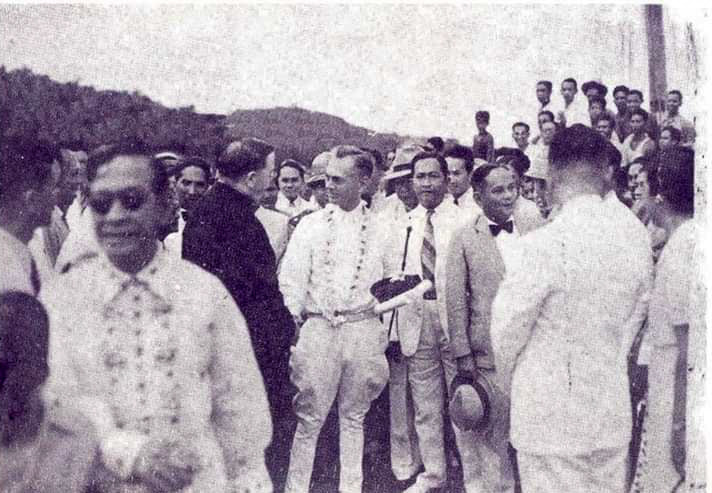
President Manuel L. Quezon during an official visit to Calapan, photographed at Calapan Port.

A primary education system using English as the language of instruction was introduced, and Calapan Port was opened to facilitate inter-island commerce. The U.S. Army Signal Corps installed military telegraph lines connecting Calapan and Batangas, while land-based telegraph services were also made available to the public in Calapan and Naujan. The development of a provincial road along the east coast, which later became part of the Strong Republic Nautical Highway, connected the island’s main towns. Additionally, the implementation of free trade between the United States and the Philippines encouraged economic growth and attracted a significant number of settlers to the previously sparsely populated areas of Mindoro and the city of Calapan.

When Mindoro became a sub-province of Marinduque on June 13, 1902, the provincial capital was once again moved to Puerto Galera, with Captain Robert S. Offley serving as the first civil governor. On November 10, 1902, Mindoro was detached from Marinduque. In 1903, Calapan once again became the provincial capital.

When Mindoro was detached from Marinduque on November 10, 1902, Baco, Puerto Galera and San Teodoro were annexed to Calapan in 1905 under Act No. 1280, adding a total area of 843 square kilometres (325 sq mi) of land. In 1902, under Act No. 2824, the three municipalities gained their independence.

In 1919, the boundary dispute between Calapan and Naujan was settled by the presidents (mayors) Agustin Quijano of Calapan and Agustin Garong of Naujan regarding a portion of territory that now defines the present boundary. The agricultural area was awarded to Naujan, reducing the size of Calapan relative to Naujan, which is currently the largest municipality in the province by land area.

=== Japanese Colonial Period and the Battle of Mindoro ===
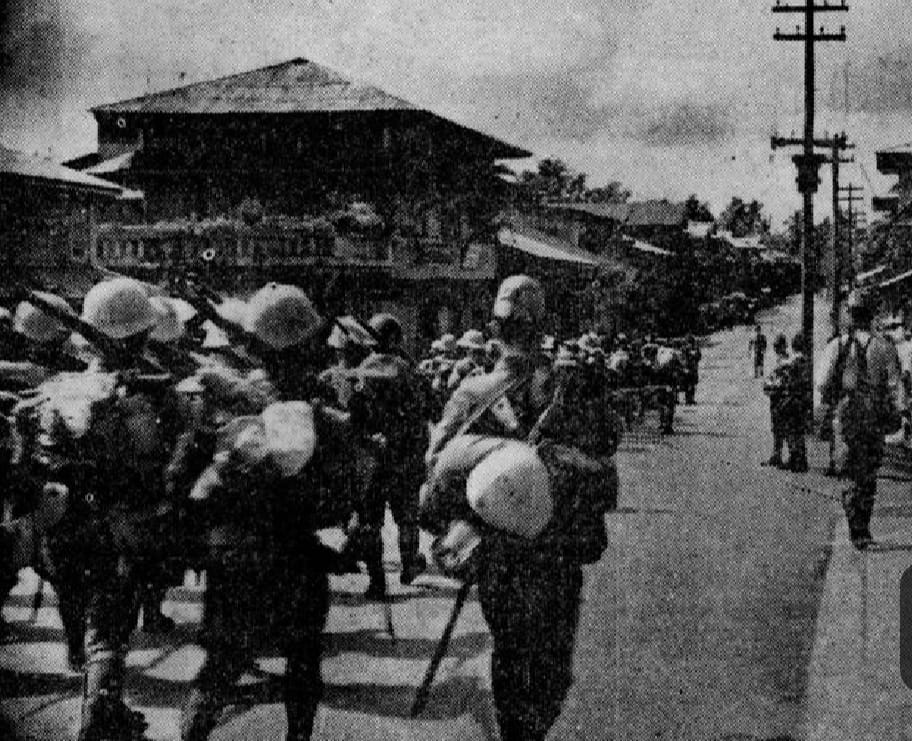
Japanese soldiers march through the deserted streets of the town center. Published by the Sunday Tribune (Manila) on March 22, 1942.

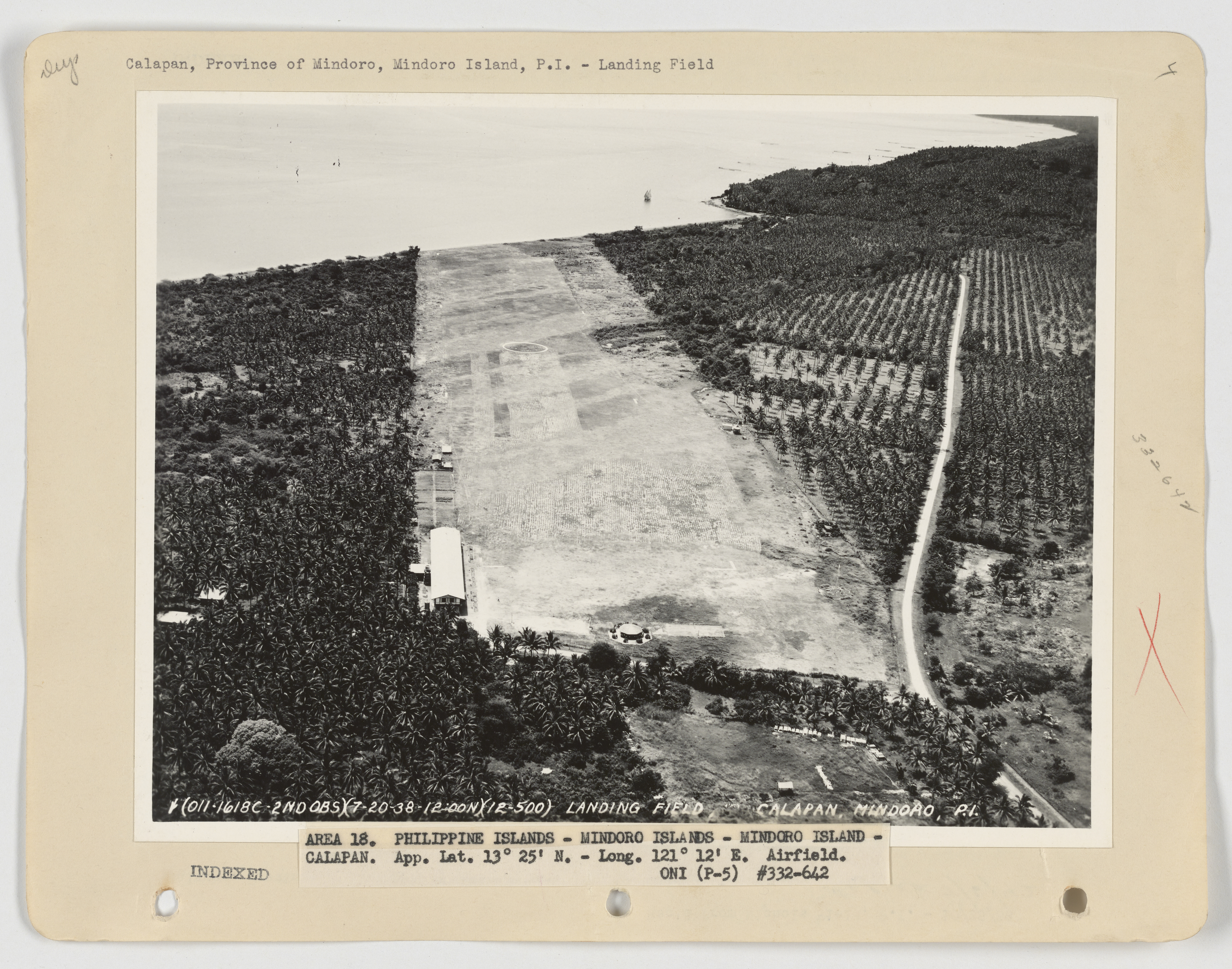
A Landing Field in Calapan (now the site of the Calapan Airport)

On 27 February 1942, Japanese forces under Colonel Kendo Suzuki landed in Barrio Silonay, Calapan, Oriental Mindoro, advancing into the town without resistance. Anticipating the invasion, Major Ramon Ruffy of the Mindoro Constabulary Company ordered a withdrawal into the hills. Lieutenant Alfredo Mendoza, who remained behind, was captured and became the first prisoner of war in Mindoro. In the early phase of the occupation, portions of Calapan, including the San Vicente district, were burned.

During the occupation, key civilian structures were repurposed for military use. The Mindoro High School compound served as a Japanese garrison and headquarters, while the Calapan Central School was converted into a barracks for Filipino constabulary units under Japanese command. The old Kuta functioned as a watch post and telegraph station. Nearby residential buildings were utilized for administrative and social functions. In response, local resistance movements emerged, notably factions led by Major Ramon Ruffy and Captain Esteban P. Beloncio.

The Allied invasion of Mindoro commenced on 15 December 1944, with American forces landing at Mangarin Bay in present-day San Jose, Occidental Mindoro. Owing to inadequate airstrip facilities in Leyte, the 503rd Parachute Regimental Combat Team was deployed by sea alongside the main assault force rather than by airborne drop. Following the landing, U.S. troops advanced northward across the island.

By 23 January 1945, American forces reached and liberated Calapan, encountering minimal resistance as Japanese troops retreated westward toward Baco and Mount Halcon. During their withdrawal, however, Japanese forces implemented scorched-earth tactics, destroying bridges and infrastructure and committing widespread atrocities against civilians. These included mass killings in locations such as Sitio Suqui and within the former Kempeitai headquarters. The violence and destruction left a significant loss of life and much of the town in ruins by the time of its liberation.

=== 1994 Mindoro Earthquake ===
In the early morning of November 15, at 3:15:30 AM (PST), a magnitude 7.1 earthquake struck the Isla Verde Passage area, producing very strong ground shaking. The quake, associated with a 35-kilometer ground rupture along the Aglubang River fault, was felt as far as Manila, about 125 kilometers away.

The disaster resulted in 78 fatalities and damage to at least 7,566 houses. Calapan recorded 17 deaths, many of which occurred in the coastal village of Wawa. A significant number of the victims were children who drowned when a tsunami that struck shortly after the main shock.

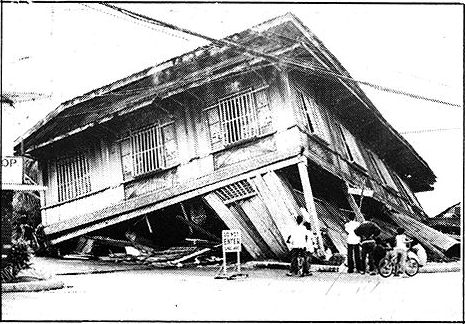
An old residential structure in Calapan town proper collapsed due to the earthquake

Within two to five minutes of the earthquake, a tsunami hit the northern shores of Oriental Mindoro and nearby islands. Witnesses described the wave as a fast-moving, white, curtain-like wall approaching from the sea, preceded by a loud roaring sound. In some areas, the sea briefly receded by about 50 meters before the waves arrived. The tsunami reached heights of up to 3–6 meters and penetrated 50 to 300 meters inland, devastating coastal communities.

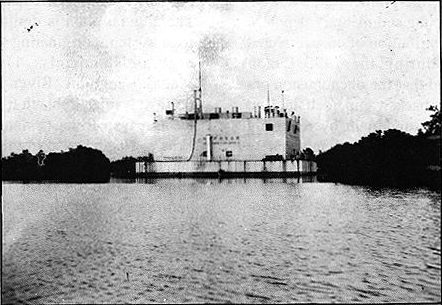
A Power barge displaced by the 1994 Mindoro tsunami.

Among the most notable impacts was the effect on the Calauangan (also known as Baruyan) River and Lake in Calapan. A power barge near the river mouth was torn from its moorings and carried about two kilometers upstream by the tsunami. The surge also generated a seiche in the lake, causing intense movement along its margins. Combined with ground failure, shoreline collapse, and geological subsidence, these processes contributed to the lake’s expansion to its present area of about 1.60 square kilometers.

Elsewhere, the tsunami eroded shorelines, transported debris inland, and destroyed homes and infrastructure. Small boats and large coral fragments were swept ashore, while both concrete structures and lightweight nipa huts were heavily damaged. Many residents were caught off guard and swept away by the sudden surge.

In Calapan, much of the reported structural damage was concentrated in coastal areas affected by the tsunami, while ground failures such as liquefaction also contributed to destruction inland. This widespread impact was also reflected in housing damage, with a total of 890 reported damaged houses. Out of these, 325 houses were completely destroyed, which represents the highest level of damage severity recorded. Despite the intensity of the earthquake, damage in the town center was reported to be relatively minimal.

Critical infrastructure was severely impacted: the main pier and terminal were damaged, disrupting ferry services. The loss of the power barge supplying electricity to northern Mindoro resulted in widespread outages, with power only restored on November 28 after a replacement barge was installed.

Water systems were also disrupted due to broken pipelines and the lack of electricity needed to operate pumps, compounding the difficulties faced by affected communities in the aftermath.

=== Cityhood ===
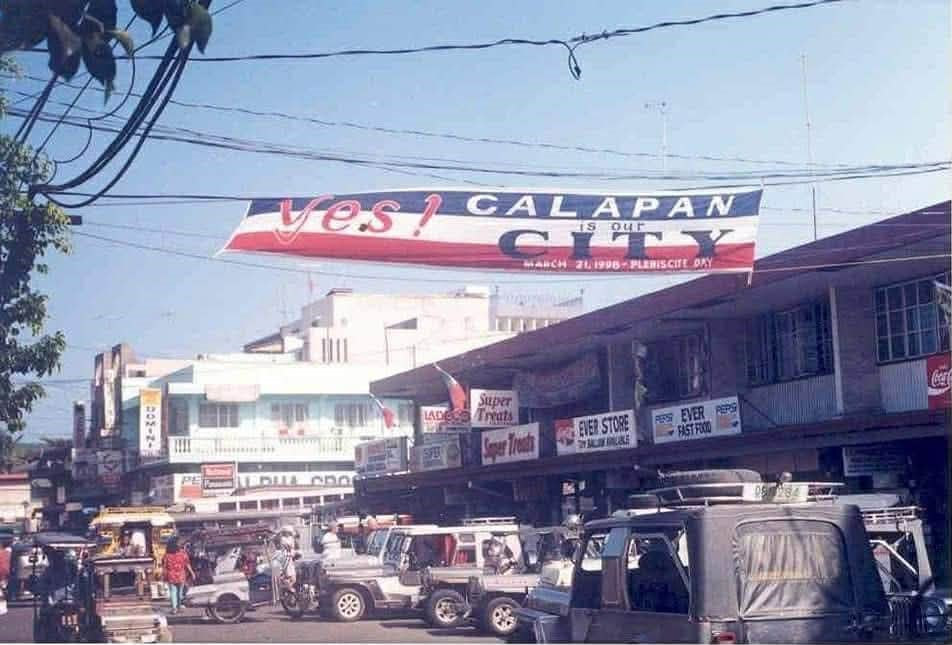
Scenes along Juan Luna Street in San Vicente Central, featuring a banner celebrating Calapan’s cityhood.

In the year 1998, Calapan was converted from a municipality into a component city through Republic Act No. 8475, authored by Rep. Renato V. Leviste and was signed by President Fidel Ramos on February 2, 1998. The conversion was ratified through a plebiscite held on March 21, 1998, which subsequently became the city’s annual foundation anniversary. Arnan C. Panaligan, who served as the municipality’s last mayor, became the city’s first mayor. To date, it is the first and only city in the whole island of Mindoro.

Calapan was reclassified from a 4th class city in 2007 to a 3rd class city in 2010, on account of its innovations in public service, modernization programs, increased revenue collection, and overall economic improvement. Calapan City was later reclassified as a 2nd Class Component City in 2025.

=== Late 20th and early 21st centuries ===
At the turn of the 21st century, Calapan underwent a period of gradual urban and administrative transformation following its conversion into a component city in 1998. As the capital of Oriental Mindoro, the city experienced steady population growth, expansion of commercial activity, and increased importance as a transportation and service hub in the island of Mindoro.

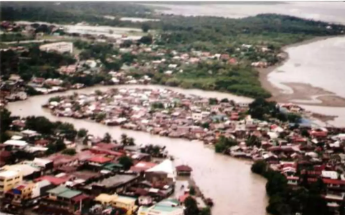
Bird’s-eye view of Downtown Calapan in the December 2005 flooding

In December 2005, Calapan experienced one of the most severe natural disasters in its recent history. A series of flooding events on 7, 17, and 27 December inundated much of the city and surrounding areas due to intense monsoon rains and the overflow of the Mag-asawang Tubig and Bucayao Rivers. Although other parts of Mindoro and Southern Luzon were affected, Calapan experienced the most severe flooding, with waters reaching chest-high levels in some areas and disrupting transportation and daily activities.

Relief operations were hindered by persistent adverse weather conditions, delaying the delivery of essential supplies and rescue efforts. The floods resulted in at least two fatalities and caused significant damage, with infrastructure losses estimated at ₱158.98 million and agricultural losses at ₱166.47 million. Environmental factors, including logging, quarrying, and slash-and-burn farming, were cited as contributing to the severity of the flooding.

On 22 November 2007, Calapan City was officially designated as the regional center of the MIMAROPA Region (Region IV-B) through Executive Order No. 682. The order established the city, as the administrative hub of the region, centralizing key government offices and services.

MIMAROPA had previously operated with dispersed regional offices. The designation of Calapan aimed to enhance administrative efficiency, improve coordination among government agencies, and provide more accessible public services to the region’s population.

Following its designation, Calapan assumed a central role in regional governance, serving as a focal point for economic activity, transportation, and institutional development. Its coastal location and connectivity have further reinforced its function as a gateway to Mindoro and other parts of the MIMAROPA Region.

== Geography ==
Calapan is bounded to the north and north-east by the Calapan Bay, south and southeast by Naujan, and to the west by the Baco. The city lies at the quadrangle bounded by 13°12.6 and 13°27’ north latitudes and 121°17’ east longitudes. It is approximately 28 nautical miles (52 km; 32 mi) from the nearest point of Batangas, 45 kilometres (28 mi) south of Batangas City and 130 kilometres (81 mi) south of Manila.

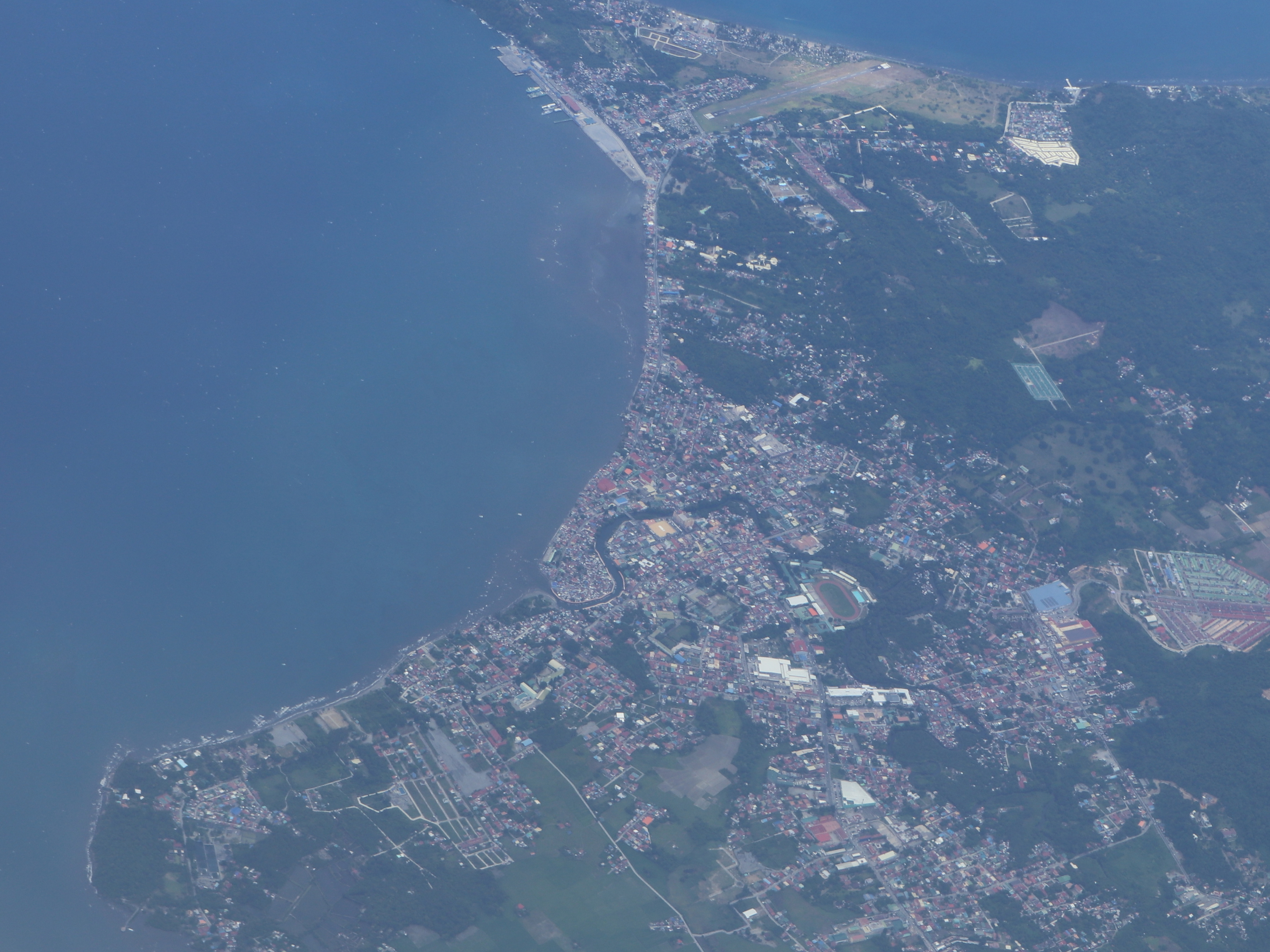
Calapan City from air (2023)

The city has an area of 250.06 km^{2} (96.55 sq mi) and is composed of 62 barangays of which 28 are classified as urban and 34, rural. The city also exercises jurisdiction over the Tatlong Pulo Archipelago, comprising Pulong Maliit, Pulong Gitna, and Pulong Malaki, as well as the two Silonay Islets in Calapan Bay, known as Anaganahao Island and Harka Piloto.

The overall land characteristic is a wide plain with rivers, interspersed with wetlands at the seacoast periphery. The highest elevation is 187 m (614 ft) above sea level at Bulusan Hill, a 6-kilometre (3.7 mi) long landform east of the city, which interrupts the mostly flat terrain north-east of the Halcon-Baco Mountain Range.

=== Barangays ===
Map showing administrative divisions of Calapan City, Oriental Mindoro

Calapan is divided into 62 barangays. Each barangay consists of puroks and some have sitios.

Urban Barangays
Barangay	Population (2020)	Population (2024)	Pop. Change
Bulusan	5,680	6,145	8.19%
Calero	1,439	1,427	-0.83%
Camilmil	4,071	3,938	-3.27%
Ibaba East	1,010	988	-2.18%
Ibaba West	2,759	2,616	-5.18%
Ilaya	3,965	3,957	-0.20%
Lalud	4,259	4,131	-3.01%
Libis	1,378	1,366	-0.87%
Lumangbayan	5,231	5,201	-0.57%
Masipit	3,052	3,060	0.26%
Salong (San Rafael)	3,784	4,062	7.35%
San Antonio	3,521	3,586	1.85%
San Vicente Central	371	285	-23.18%
San Vicente East	579	998	72.37%
San Vicente North	570	587	2.98%
San Vicente South	459	448	-2.40%
San Vicente West	527	598	13.47%
Santa Isabel	4,732	4,588	-3.04%
Santa Maria Village	1,111	1,045	-5.94%
Santo Niño	3,670	3,722	1.42%
Tawiran	2,353	2,517	6.97%
Tibag	2,414	2,441	1.12%

Rural Barangays
Barangay	Population (2020)	Population (2024)	Pop. Change
Balingayan	1,607	1,633	1.62%
Balite	4,489	4,586	2.16%
Baruyan	3,268	3,112	-4.77%
Batino	1,667	1,669	0.12%
Bayanan I	1,200	1,101	-8.25%
Bayanan II	3,084	3,057	-0.88%
Biga	2,382	2,383	0.04%
Bondoc	584	729	24.83%
Bucayao	2,640	2,617	-0.87%
Buhuan	896	829	-7.48%
Camansihan	2,493	2,418	-3.01%
Canubing I	3,949	3,962	0.33%
Canubing II	3,722	3,819	2.61%
Comunal	3,362	3,297	-1.93%
Comunal	3,362	3,297	-1.93%
Guinobatan	4,423	4,444	0.47%
Gulod	795	884	11.19%
Gutad	1,532	1,830	19.45%
Lazareto	4,799	4,916	2.44%
Mahal na Pangalan	1,526	1,661	8.85%
Maidlang	1,186	1,212	2.19%
Malad	938	952	1.49%
Malamig	1,981	2,247	13.43%
Managpi	2,945	2,914	-1.05%
Nag-iba I	989	832	-15.87%
Nag-iba II	1,708	1,533	-10.25%
Navotas	810	560	-30.86%
Pachoca	3,918	4,042	3.16%
Palhi	3,321	3,379	1.75%
Panggalaan	594	586	-1.35%
Parang	3,352	3,353	0.03%
Patas	932	936	0.43%
Personas	1,635	1,871	14.43%
Puting Tubig	1,529	1,536	0.46%
Santa Cruz	809	842	4.08%
Santa Rita	1,864	1,824	-2.15%
Sapul	4,452	4,557	2.36%
Silonay	1,369	1,551	13.29%
Suqui	3,778	4,475	18.45%
Tawagan	1,348	1,375	2.00%
Wawa	975	848	-13.03%

=== Climate ===
Calapan's climate is described as mild. It is relatively dry from November to April and wet during the rest of the year. February and March have the least rainfall while October and November are the months of greatest rainfall. Average yearly rainfall is 2,500 to 4,500 millimetres (98 to 177 in) at the city's south-west portion. The average daily temperature is 22.9 to 28.3 °C (73.2 to 82.9 °F).

Wind direction throughout the year is variable; Northeast monsoons prevail from August, November, December and January to March; East to Northeast on April; Southeast to South on May and June; Northeast to South on July and September, and Easterly on October.

Climate is favorable for vegetation throughout the year under the Type III climate type of the Philippine weather bureau, PAGASA, with relative humidity at 81%.

Climate data for Calapan, Oriental Mindoro (1991–2020, extremes 1949–2020)
Month	Jan	Feb	Mar	Apr	May	Jun	Jul	Aug	Sep	Oct	Nov	Dec	Year
Record high °C (°F)	33.5 (92.3)	34.0 (93.2)	35.2 (95.4)	36.5 (97.7)	37.2 (99.0)	37.1 (98.8)	36.5 (97.7)	37.6 (99.7)	36.8 (98.2)	35.5 (95.9)	35.0 (95.0)	34.0 (93.2)	37.6 (99.7)
Mean daily maximum °C (°F)	29.6 (85.3)	30.3 (86.5)	31.4 (88.5)	32.8 (91.0)	33.3 (91.9)	32.7 (90.9)	31.9 (89.4)	32.0 (89.6)	32.0 (89.6)	31.6 (88.9)	31.0 (87.8)	29.9 (85.8)	31.5 (88.7)
Daily mean °C (°F)	25.9 (78.6)	26.3 (79.3)	27.2 (81.0)	28.4 (83.1)	28.8 (83.8)	28.3 (82.9)	27.8 (82.0)	27.9 (82.2)	27.9 (82.2)	27.6 (81.7)	27.2 (81.0)	26.3 (79.3)	27.5 (81.5)
Mean daily minimum °C (°F)	22.2 (72.0)	22.4 (72.3)	23.1 (73.6)	24.1 (75.4)	24.3 (75.7)	23.9 (75.0)	23.6 (74.5)	23.7 (74.7)	23.7 (74.7)	23.5 (74.3)	23.4 (74.1)	22.8 (73.0)	23.4 (74.1)
Record low °C (°F)	17.5 (63.5)	16.2 (61.2)	18.4 (65.1)	16.4 (61.5)	14.0 (57.2)	14.7 (58.5)	19.0 (66.2)	17.6 (63.7)	19.4 (66.9)	18.4 (65.1)	16.2 (61.2)	18.0 (64.4)	14.0 (57.2)
Average rainfall mm (inches)	113.1 (4.45)	69.8 (2.75)	82.5 (3.25)	100.8 (3.97)	193.4 (7.61)	276.8 (10.90)	279.6 (11.01)	201.3 (7.93)	212.4 (8.36)	306.6 (12.07)	297.4 (11.71)	274.6 (10.81)	2,408.3 (94.81)
Average rainy days (≥ 1.0 mm)	14	9	8	8	10	14	16	13	13	15	17	19	156
Average relative humidity (%)	86	84	83	81	82	84	86	86	86	86	87	88	85
Source: PAGASA

== Demographics ==
Population census of Calapan
Year	Pop.	±% p.a.
1903	5,554	—
1918	13,571	+6.14%
1939	17,158	+1.12%
1948	22,340	+2.98%
1960	33,060	+3.32%
1970	47,532	+3.69%
1975	55,608	+3.20%
1980	67,370	+3.91%
1990	85,898	+2.46%
1995	96,506	+2.21%
2000	105,910	+2.01%
2007	116,976	+1.38%
2010	124,173	+2.20%
2015	133,893	+1.45%
2020	145,786	+1.81%
2024	148,558	+0.45%
Source: Philippine Statistics Authority

Calapan has a population of 148,558 people as of the 2024 census.

=== Language ===
Tagalog and English are widely spoken in the city. The Tagalog spoken in Calapan has historically been influenced by the Batangas dialect, largely due to the city’s geographical proximity to Batangas and the presence of Batangueño residents in the province.

Several indigenous Mangyan languages, particularly Alangan, Hanunoo, and Iraya, are also spoken to some extent in the city. Other Philippine languages spoken by migrant communities include Ilocano, various Bisayan languages such as Cebuano and Waray, Bicolano, and Hiligaynon (Ilonggo), among others. A Chinese-Filipino community is likewise present in the city, with Mandarin Chinese and Filipino Hokkien commonly spoken among members of the diaspora.

=== Religion ===
Roman Catholicism is the predominant religion in Calapan, with 128,780 adherents or approximately 88.7% of the city’s population as of 2020. Other Christian denominations and groups such as the Iglesia ni Cristo, Jesus Is Lord Church, The Church of Jesus Christ of Latter-day Saints, and various Protestant groups also maintain communities within the city, alongside smaller Muslim and non-Christian populations.

== Economy ==
Poverty incidence of Calapan (%)

Source: Philippine Statistics Authority

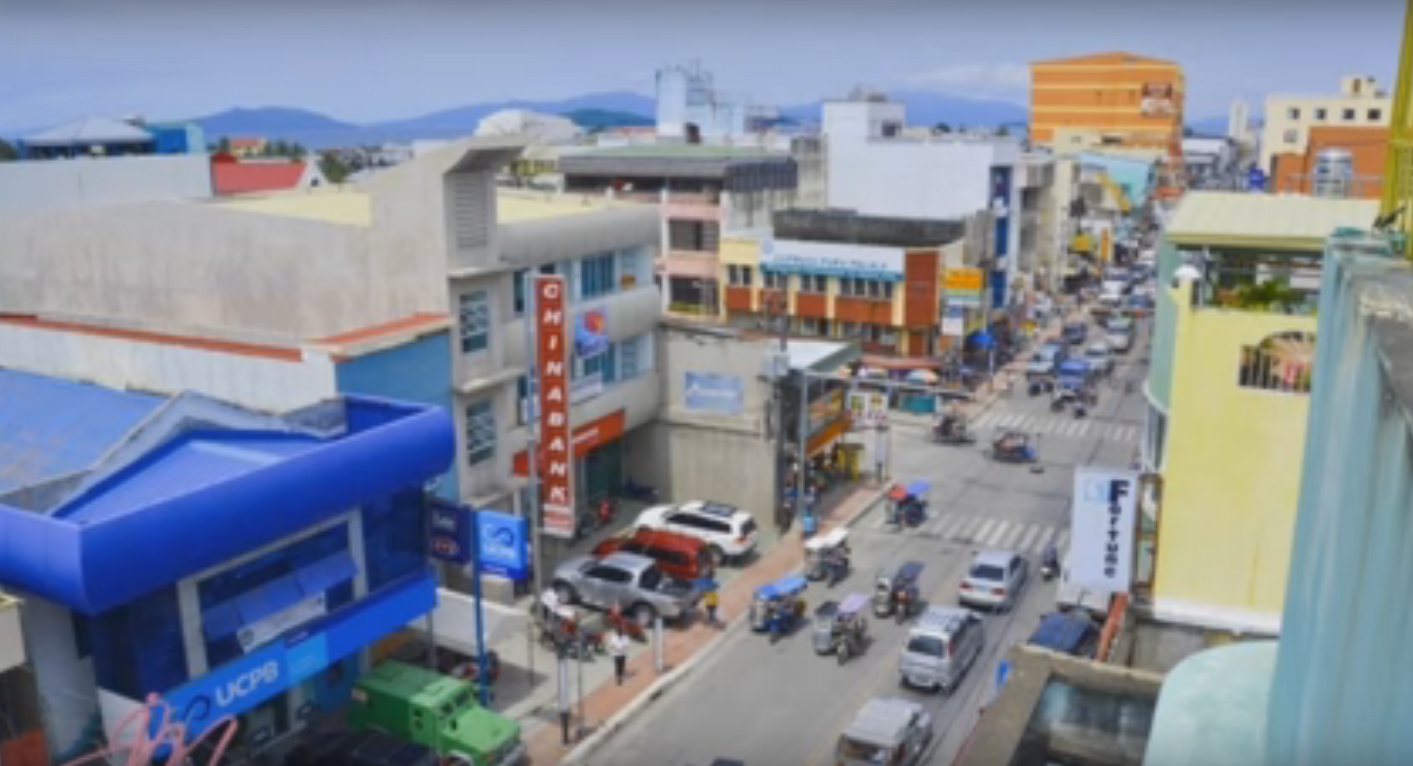
Calapan downtown area

Since the late 1990s, Calapan has undergone rapid urbanization and development, emerging as one of the fastest-growing cities in the Philippines and the principal administrative, commercial, and economic center of the MIMAROPA Region. As the provincial capital and largest urban settlement of Oriental Mindoro, it concentrates a wide range of activities, including public administration, financial services, higher education, wholesale and retail trade, agriculture, and fisheries. The city hosts the regional offices of national government agencies, business process outsourcing (BPO) firms, and major commercial establishments. Furthermore, its role as the primary gateway between Mindoro Island and mainland Luzon strengthens its position as a vital regional logistics and distribution hub. This sustained population growth, coupled with expanding infrastructure and increasing private investment, continues to diversify Calapan's local economy and drive its urban expansion.

=== Agriculture and Fisheries ===
Agriculture remains one of the traditional pillars of Calapan's economy despite the city's continuing urbanization. A significant portion of its land area remains devoted to agricultural production, particularly in its rural barangays. As of 2022, Calapan consists of 37 agricultural barangays, with approximately 10,250 hectares of agricultural land cultivated by more than 4,000 registered farmers.

A majority of Calapan's agricultural land is devoted to rice production. Other crops grown in the area are citrus fruits such as calamansi, banana, lanzones, rambutan, mango, coconut, and various other fruits and vegetables. Agricultural production in the city contributes to the broader agricultural economy of Oriental Mindoro, which is the country's leading producer of calamansi, accounting for more than one-third of national production and the vast majority of output in the MIMAROPA Region.

Fisheries also contribute to Calapan's agricultural economy, particularly in coastal barangays along the Verde Island Passage. The sector is characterized by municipal and small-scale fishing activities, with much of the city's fisheries production originating from backyard fishpond operations and aquaculture. These activities supply fish and other aquatic products to local markets and support employment in fishing, fish farming, processing, and trade. Calapan also benefits from the marine resources of Calapan Bay, including the Calero–Salong Seagrass and Corals Marine Protected Area (MPA), which has been recognized for its high fish biomass and ecological significance within the bay.

The agricultural sector do face several constraints, including vulnerability to typhoons and flooding, which affect crop yields and farm infrastructure. Other challenges include limited irrigation coverage in some rural areas, post-harvest losses due to inadequate storage and processing facilities, fluctuations in farmgate prices, and the conversion of agricultural land into residential and commercial uses associated with urban expansion.

The agricultural sector has also been affected by land tenure and land use disputes in some rural barangays. In 2025, local reports documented conflicts involving agricultural land in Calapan, where residents raised concerns over the fencing of privately claimed properties that limited access to cultivated areas and nearby settlements. The incident prompted protests and calls for intervention from local authorities and agrarian reform agencies.

Fisheries were also disrupted by the 2023 MT Princess Empress oil spill, which affected coastal waters in Oriental Mindoro, including areas connected to Calapan Bay and the Verde Island Passage. Fishing activities were temporarily suspended in affected areas, resulting in income losses among municipal fishers while cleanup operations were ongoing.

=== Commerce, Trade, and Retail ===
Calapan serves as the principal commercial center of Oriental Mindoro and functions as the province's primary hub for wholesale and retail trade. Commercial activity is concentrated in the city's urban core, where shopping centers, public markets, financial institutions, restaurants, and service establishments cater to residents from across the province.

Trade and logistics activities are supported by the Port of Calapan, one of the principal seaports in the MIMAROPA Region. The port facilitates the movement of passengers, agricultural commodities, manufactured goods, fuel, and other cargo between Mindoro and mainland Luzon through regular roll-on/roll-off (RoRo) ferry services.

The value of domestic trade passing through Calapan reached ₱21.09 billion during the third quarter of 2024, representing a 306.6 percent increase from the ₱5.19 billion recorded during the same period in 2023. Trade volume likewise increased by 62.8 percent, from 361,566 metric tons in the third quarter of 2023 to 588,668 metric tons in the third quarter of 2024.

The growth of commerce and trade has been accompanied by increasing private-sector investment in retail, real estate, banking, hospitality, and professional services. In the 2024 Cities and Municipalities Competitiveness Index, Calapan was recognized as the most resilient component city in the Philippines and ranked among the country's most competitive component cities.

=== Services and Industry ===
The services sector constitutes the largest share of economic activity in Calapan and the broader economy of Oriental Mindoro. As the provincial capital, the city concentrates government institutions, educational facilities, healthcare services, banking and finance, and professional services. Wholesale and retail trade, transportation and storage, accommodation and food services, and public administration are among the most significant service industries in the city.

Industrial activity in Calapan is relatively limited and is dominated by small and medium-scale enterprises. These include rice milling, food processing, coconut-based production, construction materials, and other light manufacturing activities, which are typically linked to agricultural output in Oriental Mindoro.

== Transportation ==
=== Roads ===
Calapan is served by an extensive road network comprising national, provincial, city, barangay, and NIA roads.

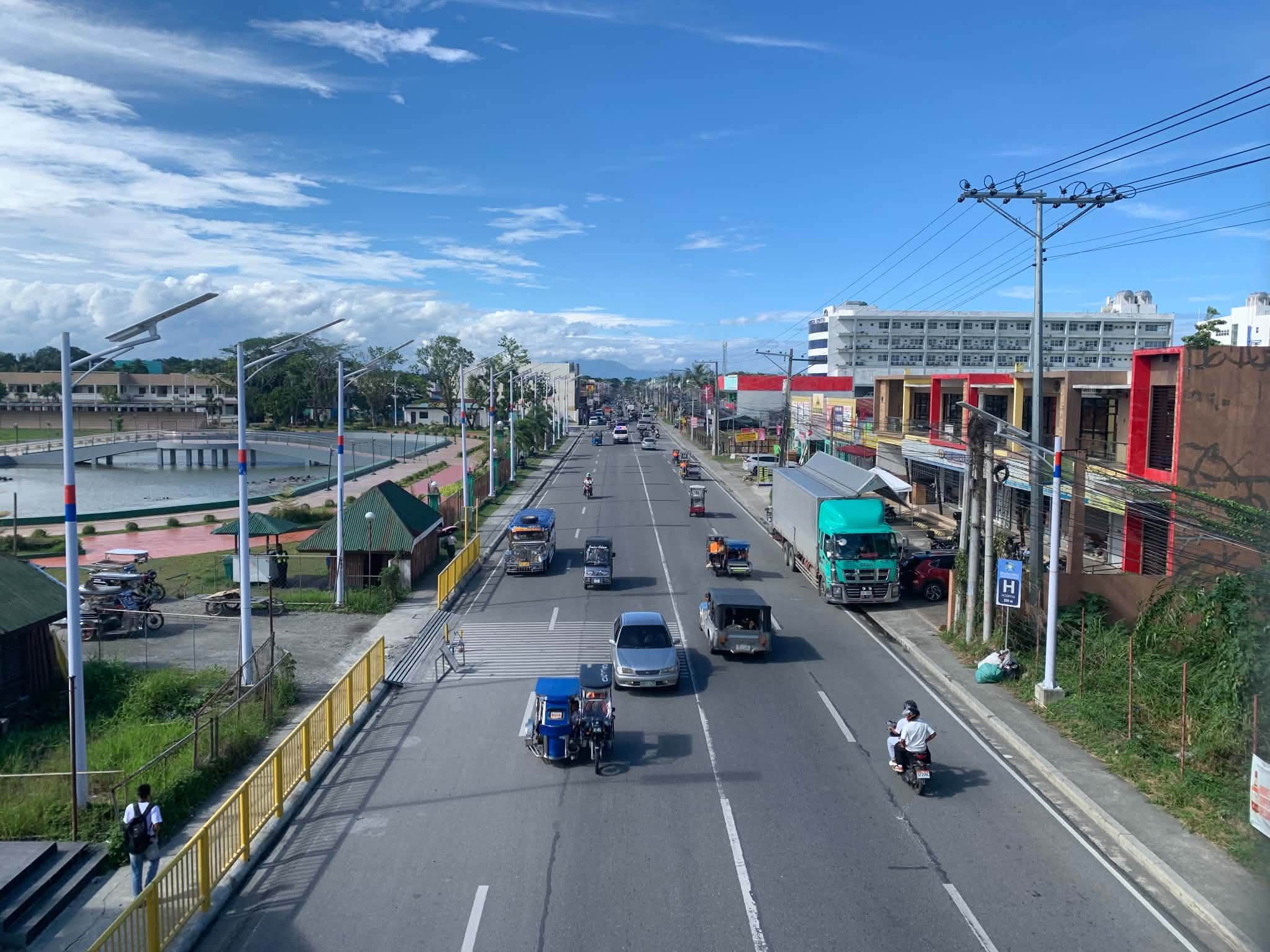
J.P. Rizal Street

The principal transport corridor is the Mindoro segment of the Strong Republic Nautical Highway (SRNH), designated as N452, which consists of several major road sections. These include the Calapan North Road, which connects the city to the municipality of Puerto Galera and, upon completion of the Abra de Ilog–Puerto Galera Road, is expected to provide access to northern Occidental Mindoro, including the municipalities of Abra de Ilog and Mamburao. The Calapan South Road serves as another primary route, linking the city to southern municipalities of Oriental Mindoro, such as Pinamalayan and Roxas, as well as to parts of Occidental Mindoro, including San Jose. This route also supports long-distance bus services connecting Calapan to destinations in Visayas, including Aklan and Iloilo, via Metro Manila.

Other major roads within the city include J.P. Rizal Street, a key thoroughfare traversing downtown Calapan, and M. Roxas Drive, which runs relatively parallel to it. Quezon Drive provides access to the Port of Calapan, while the Suqui–Sapul Road (N455) connects to Calapan Airport and offers an alternative route to the port, in addition to serving nearby barangays.

In addition to these primary routes, the city is supported by numerous secondary city and barangay roads, as well as rural infrastructure such as NIA-administered roads and farm-to-market (FMR) roads, which play a significant role in supporting agricultural activities in the surrounding areas.

=== Land Transportation ===
Motorized tricycles are a common mode of transport in Calapan, primarily serving short-distance travel within the city. Pedicabs are also widely used, particularly in the downtown area, for very short trips.

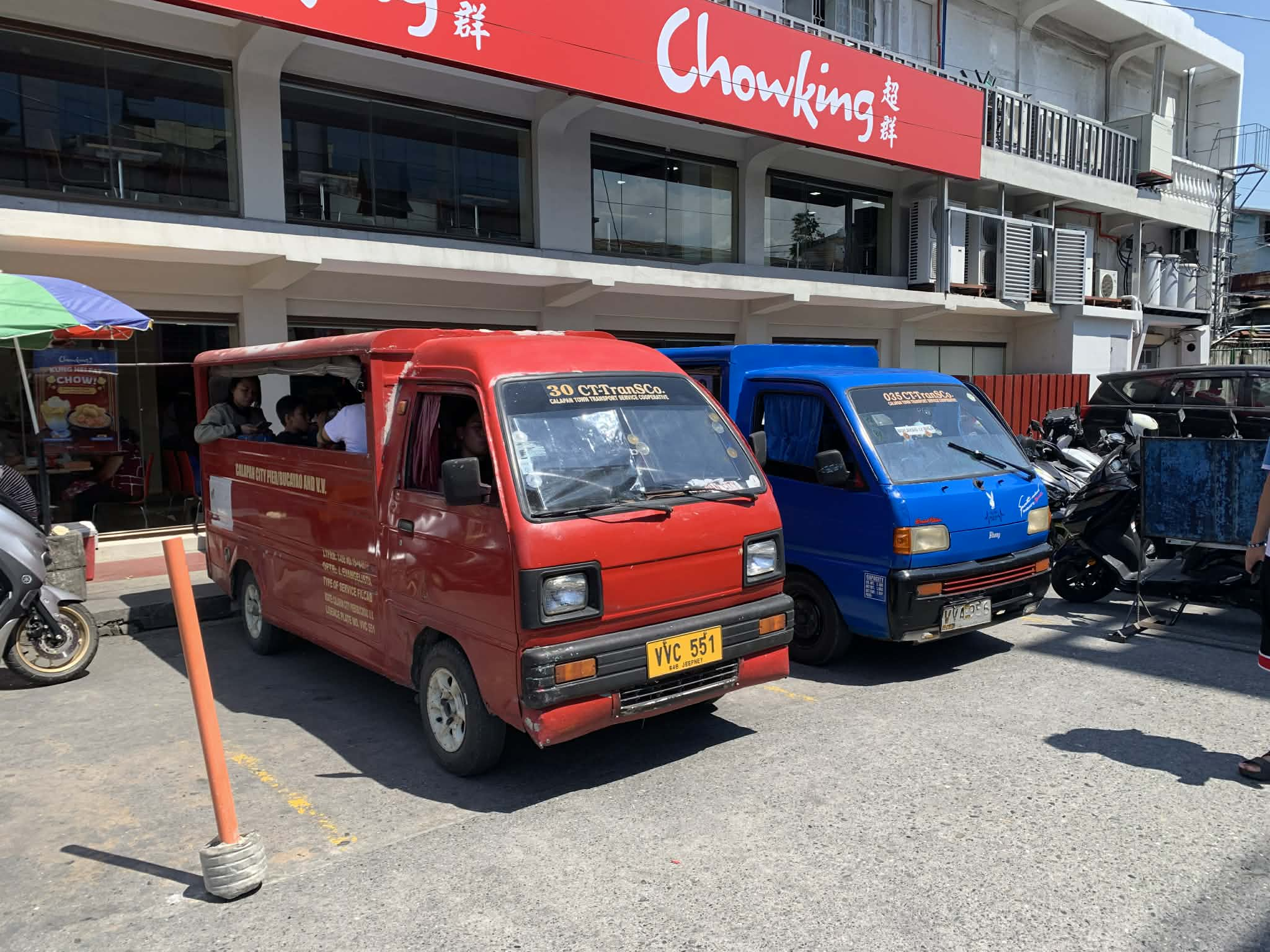
Multicabs lined up near the public market, serving routes to different stops in the city.

Jeepneys, electric jeepneys (e-jeeps), multicabs, and some van routes provide transportation within the city and to nearby municipalities in Oriental Mindoro, traversing both urban and rural areas. These routes connect Calapan to northern municipalities such as Puerto Galera, San Teodoro, and Baco, as well as to southern municipalities including Naujan and Victoria, and extend to more distant areas such as Socorro and Pinamalayan. Within the city, routes also serve outlying barangays.

For longer-distance travel, buses and vans operate routes to the southern parts of Oriental Mindoro and onward to the neighboring province of Occidental Mindoro.

Interprovincial bus services linking Metro Manila, including terminals in Cubao, PITX, and Alabang, to southern Mindoro and a few destinations in the Visayas, such as Iloilo, also pass through Calapan.

=== Water Transportation ===
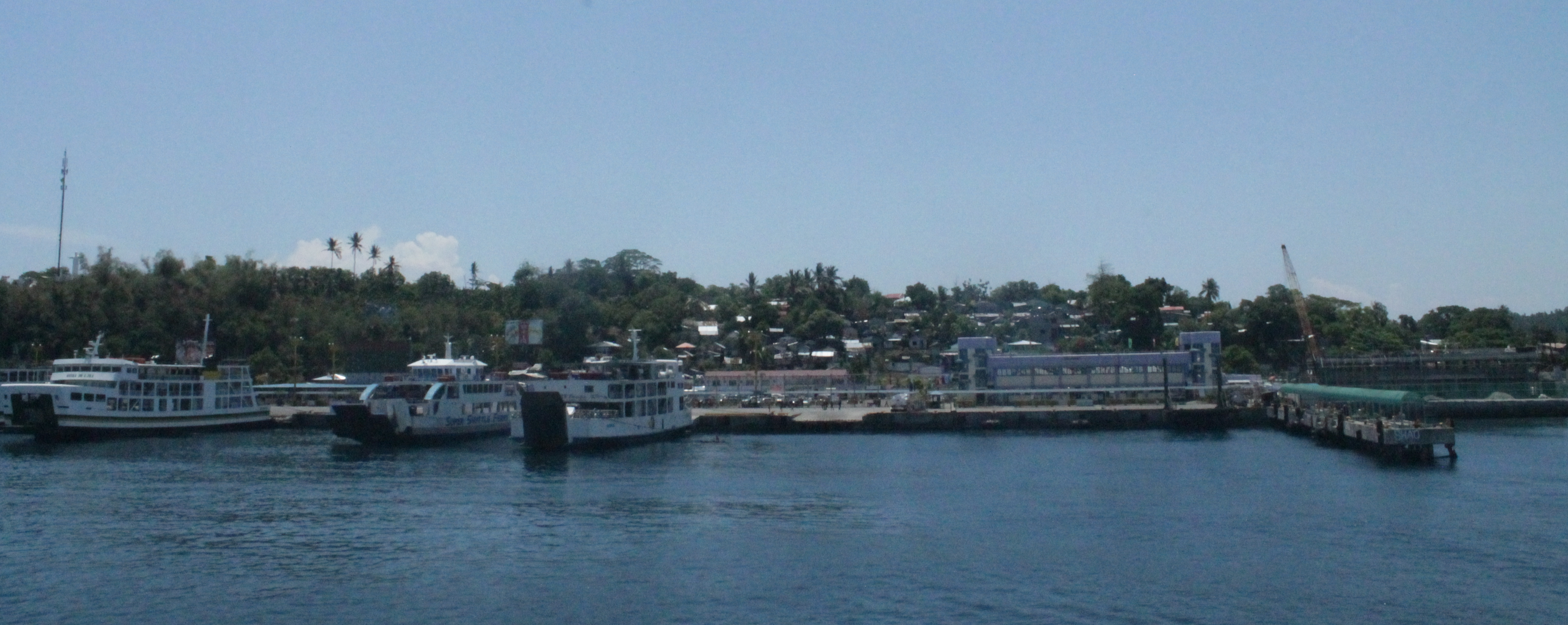
An Old Photo of the Port of Calapan

The Port of Calapan serves as the primary maritime gateway of the Island of Mindoro, providing regular connections to Batangas International Port in mainland Luzon. The route is serviced by a range of vessels, including fast craft, conventional ferries, and larger roll-on/roll-off (RoRo) ships.

The Port of Calapan is an approximately 75,000-square-meter complex that includes key facilities such as a Law Enforcement Building (LEB), Port Operations Building (POB), land transportation terminal, and four access gates.

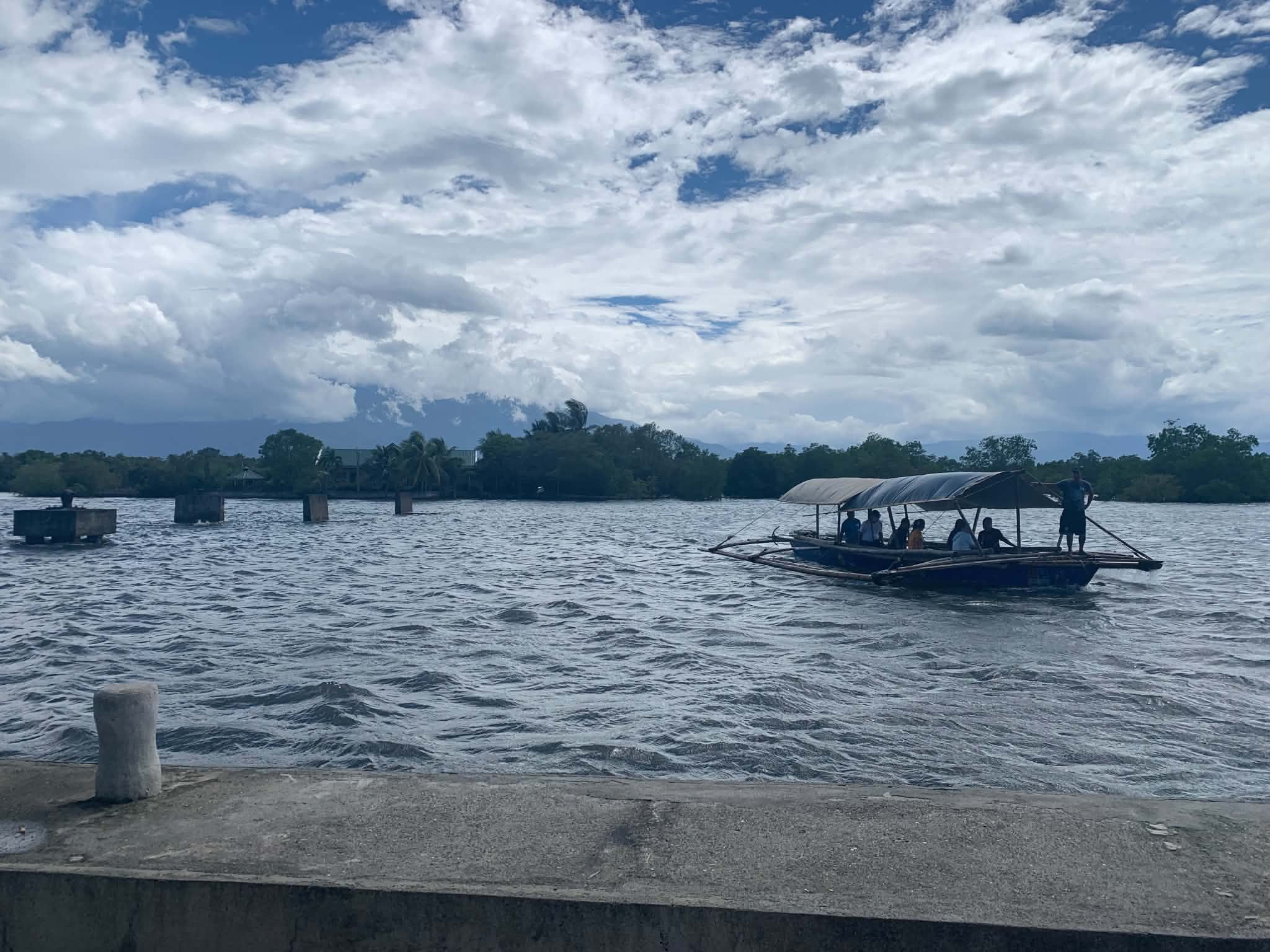
Bangka crossing the Bucayao River to Wawa Port

The Passenger Terminal Building (PTB), inaugurated in March 2023, is currently the largest seaport terminal in the Philippines in terms of passenger capacity, with a capacity of 3,500 passengers. The port remains under ongoing expansion.

Major shipping companies such as Montenegro Shipping Lines and Starlite Ferries operate frequent, near round-the-clock trips between the two ports, while other operators, including FastCat, OceanJet, and SuperCat, provide scheduled ferry services throughout the day.

In addition to these regular routes, limited services are available via smaller vessels. The motor bangka M/B Anyayahan operates trips between Calapan and Lobo, Batangas, typically three times a week (Mondays, Wednesdays, and Saturdays) with a single scheduled departure.

Local maritime transport is also present within the vicinity of Calapan. Small bangka services operate across the Baruyan River from the Port of Barangay Wawa to Barangay Pambisan in Baco. Informal for-hire banca services are likewise available for short-distance travel within Calapan Bay, including trips to nearby islets and, on occasion, to more distant locations such as Isla Verde in Batangas.

=== Air Transportation ===
The Calapan Airport (IATA Code: RPUK), classified as a secondary airport and is used for general aviation handling mostly small planes and choppers. As of present, the airport does not serve any regularly scheduled commercial flights.

== Tourism ==
=== Festivals ===
Calapan hosts several annual religious and cultural festivals that promote the city's heritage, tourism, and local traditions.

The Kalap Festival, celebrated every March 21, commemorates the founding anniversary of Calapan. As the city's official festival, it features street dancing, a grand parade, cultural performances, trade fairs, sporting events, beauty pageants, and the Bangkathon (outrigger boat race). Festival performances and costumes are inspired by the origin of the city's name, kalap ("to gather"), depicting traditional livelihoods such as farming, fishing, and forest gathering.

The Santo Niño de Calapan Festival is a month-long religious celebration held from December to January 1 in honor of the city's patron, the Santo Niño. The festival combines religious observances, including processions and liturgical celebrations, with cultural presentations, Christmas activities, concerts, trade fairs, and street dancing, culminating on New Year's Day.

The Mahalta Na Festival, held annually in November, showcases the cultural heritage, traditions, and history of Oriental Mindoro. The festival brings together contingents from the province's different towns in a showcase of local festivals, cultural traditions, and performances celebrating Mindoreño heritage. Its name, "Mahalta Na," is an acronym derived from four of the province's iconic symbols: the Mangyan people, Mount Halcon, the Tamaraw, and Naujan Lake.

The Pandang Gitab Festival, held annually in February, features nighttime street dancing inspired by the traditional Pandanggo sa Ilaw ("fandango in light"), a folk dance originating from Lubang Island. The festival commemorates the custom of fishermen's families welcoming them ashore with lighted oil lamps and is characterized by performers carrying illuminated lamps while dressed in traditional baro't saya and other Filipino attire.

=== Ecotourism ===
Tourism in Calapan is primarily centered on nature and ecotourism, with many of the city's attractions associated with its coastal environments, mangrove forests, rivers, and upland landscapes.

Calapan is situated along Calapan Bay, with an extensive coastline that includes black sand beaches on its eastern and western shores. These coastal areas support a number of beach resorts and recreational facilities and serve as gateways to the Verde Island Passage. The city government has identified the Baruyan River as a developing priority area for ecotourism development through river-based tourism and conservation initiatives.

The city's upland landscape is dominated by Bulusan Hill, the highest point within Calapan. The hill is covered by secondary forests and is home to Bulusan Park, which contains century-old trees and recreational facilities. It also serves as the starting point of the Bulusan Eco-Trail, a hiking trail that descends to the coast of Barangay Parang. The area is frequently used for hiking, trekking, jogging, mountain biking, environmental education, and nature-based recreation.

Calapan also contains one of the most extensive networks of urban and coastal mangrove ecosystems in the Philippines. Mangrove forests and conservation areas are distributed from the western coast, through the San Vicente River within the urban center, to the coastal barangays of Silonay and Maidlang in the east. These mangrove ecosystems provide important ecological functions, including shoreline protection, carbon sequestration, and nursery habitats for fish and crustaceans, while also supporting environmental education and community-based ecotourism.

The city's coastal waters form part of the Verde Island Passage and include the Calero–Salong Seagrass and Corals Marine Protected Area, Harka Piloto Fish Sanctuary, and the Baco Islands, which support coral reefs, seagrass beds, and diverse marine life. Several recreational dive sites have been identified in Calapan Bay, including those around Harka Piloto and the Baco Islands, as part of efforts to develop dive tourism while promoting marine conservation.

=== Heritage ===
The Oriental Mindoro Heritage Museum, located at the Old Provincial Capitol complex, stands on the former site of a Spanish-era fortress. The museum houses collections related to the geological, ethnographic, cultural, and political history of Oriental Mindoro, including artifacts and exhibits highlighting the province's indigenous communities, biodiversity, and historical development.

The Calapan City Museum, located within the City Hall complex, serves as a repository of local history and civic heritage. It features exhibits documenting the development of Calapan and aspects of the city's historical and cultural background.

Calapan retains several heritage structures, including surviving bahay-na-bato and other ancestral houses. Many of these buildings have been adaptively reused as cafés, restaurants, and other private establishments. The city also features various monuments and historical markers commemorating important events, figures, and aspects of the city's history.

== Education ==
=== Higher Education ===
Calapan serves as a center for higher education in Oriental Mindoro, hosting several public and private institutions that cater to students from across the province and neighboring areas. Among the largest and oldest institutions is the Divine Word College of Calapan, a Catholic educational institution administered by the Society of the Divine Word (SVD).

Other private higher education institutions in the city include St. Anthony College of Calapan, Luna Goco Colleges, Southwestern College of Maritime, Business and Technology, Inc., AMA Computer Learning Center–Calapan, St. Mark Arts and Institute Inc and Mindoro Merchant Marine School. These institutions offer programs in fields such as business, education, information technology, healthcare, nursing, tourism, and maritime studies.

Public higher education in the city is provided by the Calapan campus of the Mindoro State University and the City College of Calapan, a local government-funded institution established in 2008. Mindoro State University has proposed the establishment of an additional campus in Barangay Lazareto to support increasing student demand and the introduction of new academic programs. Meanwhile, the City Government of Calapan has outlined plans to expand the City College of Calapan through the development of additional facilities and campus infrastructure.

=== Basic education ===
Basic education in Calapan is administered by the Schools Division of Calapan City. As of 2026, The public school system consists of 49 elementary schools and 11 secondary schools, supplemented by private educational institutions that offer programs from kindergarten to senior high school.

Among the city's public secondary schools is the Oriental Mindoro National High School (OMNHS), the largest public high school in Oriental Mindoro. Other public secondary schools serve communities across the city's urban and rural barangays.

Private basic education is provided by several institutions. Notable examples include the Holy Infant Academy, which is administered by the Roman Catholic Church, and the Basic Education Department of the Divine Word College of Calapan. Other private schools in the city offer a range of academic, technical-vocational, and faith-based educational programs.

Public elementary schools in the city are organized under the Calapan East, Calapan West, and Calapan South districts, which oversee the delivery of primary education and related educational services throughout the city's barangays.

== Healthcare ==
Calapan serves as the principal healthcare center of Oriental Mindoro and hosts a concentration of public and private medical facilities that provide primary, secondary, and tertiary healthcare services to residents of the province and neighboring areas of Mindoro.

Public healthcare services are anchored by the Oriental Mindoro Provincial Hospital, the province's principal government hospital. Private healthcare institutions in the city include the Luna Goco Medical Center, Mindoro Medical Center, Maria Estrella General Hospital, Medical Mission Group Hospital and Health Services Cooperative, Hospital of the Holy Cross, and Sta. Maria Village Hospital.

Primary healthcare is administered by the City Health Office through a network of Rural Health Units (RHUs) and Barangay Health Stations (BHS) located throughout the city's barangays. These facilities provide preventive and community-based healthcare services, including immunization programs, maternal and child healthcare, disease prevention, and outpatient consultations.

Healthcare infrastructure in the city has continued to expand in recent years. In 2025, a Super Health Center was inaugurated to improve access to medical services, particularly for residents of outlying communities. Additional investments under the Department of Health's Health Facilities Enhancement Program have supported the upgrading and expansion of local healthcare facilities.

The former Oriental Mindoro Provincial Hospital complex, which now houses the Oriental Mindoro Rehabilitation and Recovery Center, has also been identified for conversion into the proposed MIMAROPA Regional Hospital. Under the proposal filed in Congress, the facility is envisioned to be upgraded into a tertiary-level regional hospital with an authorized capacity of 500 beds, which would make it the largest hospitals in the MIMAROPA Region. If established, it would also become the first Department of Health-accredited regional hospital in the region.

== Government ==
=== Elected officials ===
Members of the Calapan City Council (2025–2028)
Position	Name
District Representative (1st Legislative District of the province of Oriental Mindoro)	Arnan C. Panaligan
Chief Executive of the City of Calapan (Mayor)	Paulino Salvador "Doy" C. Leachon
Presiding Officer of the City Council of Calapan (Vice Mayor)	Rommel Rodolfo "Bim" A. Ignacio
Members of the City Council	Federico "Jun" A. Cabailo Jr.
Members of the City Council	Roberto "RC" L. Concepcion
Members of the City Council	Mary Pauline Mylene A. De Jesus
Members of the City Council	Genie R. Fortu
Members of the City Council	Ricka Marie P. Goco-Padre
Members of the City Council	Vicente Rafael "Rap" L. Infantado
Members of the City Council	Jelina Maree "Jel" D. Magsuci
Members of the City Council	Lorybelle "Bel" M. Tanyag-Panaligan
Members of the City Council	Rius Anthony C. Agua
Members of the City Council	Jan Joseph T. Umali

== Notable people ==
- Arra San Agustin - Filipina noontime show presenter host of Eat Bulaga! and actress
- Néstor Vicente Madali González - Internationally acclaimed writer and educator
- 3rd Lt. Jose Protacio C. Gozar - Pilot officer with the Philippine Army Air Corps who received the Distinguished Service Cross for his gallantry during the air war at the onset of World War II.
- Col. Arnulfo Acedillo Acedera, - Pilot officer with the Philippine Army Air Corps, and father of AFP Chief of Staff Arnulfo Acedera Jr.
- Jason Francisco - 3rd Placer, Pinoy Big Brother: Double Up
- Karen Reyes - 2nd Big Placer of Pinoy Big Brother: Teen Edition 4
- Charo Santos-Concio - Member of Board of Directors (former President & CEO), ABS-CBN Corporation
- Col. Pedro A. Serran (USAFFE-AFP)-- Son of Isidro and Maxima Serran, born November 26, 1913, in Calapan. Known as the "Liberator of Zarraga," Iloilo Province during World War II. He died on June 8, 1999, in Colorado, U.S.A., and is buried in Pittsburgh, California. His life-size statue stands on the park named after him in Zarraga. It was inaugurated in 1998.
- Joseph Mercado - Vice President, Polytechnic University of the Philippines
- Jose Antonio N. Carrion - Governor of Marinduque, 2007 – 2010
  - Bryan Alcantara - Governor of JD1202, 2026 – 2027
