= Port of Calapan =

Port of Calapan Pantalan ng Calapan
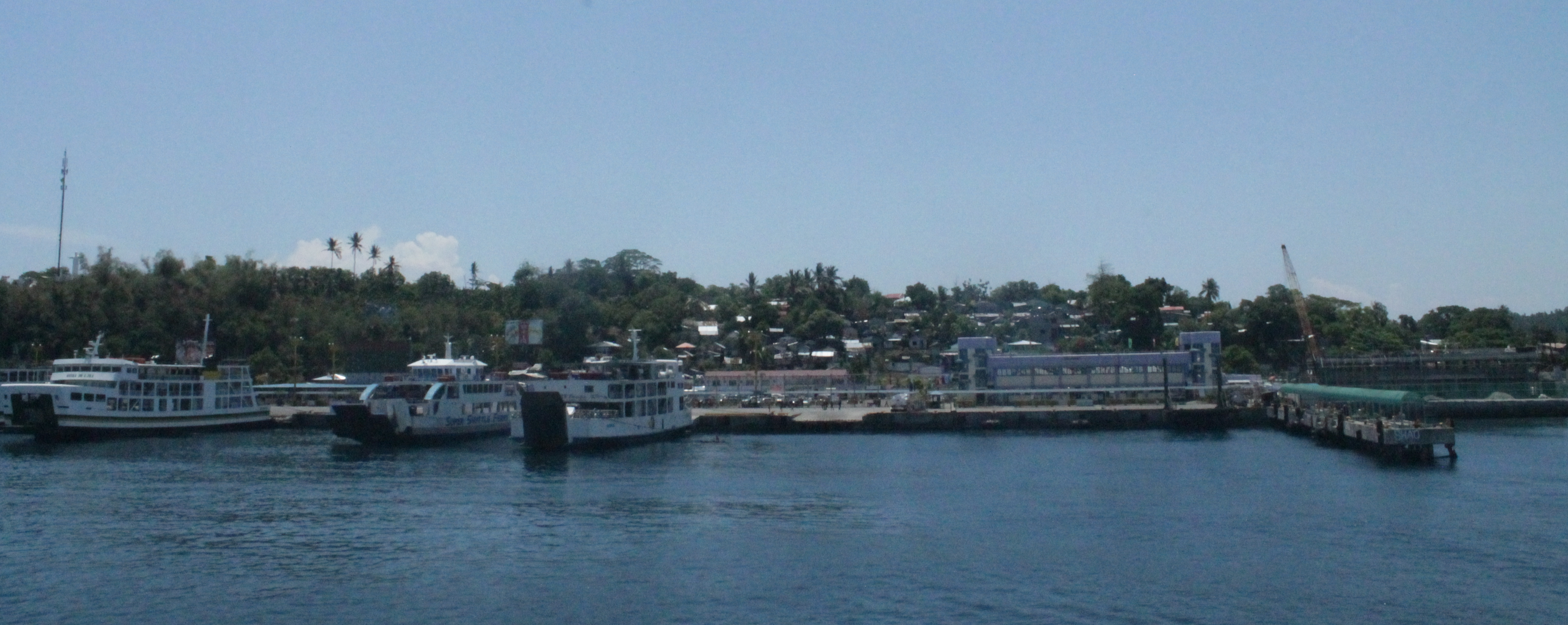
- Interactive map of Port of Calapan; Pantalan ng Calapan

Location
- Country: Philippines
- Location: Calapan, Oriental Mindoro
- Coordinates: 13°25.8′N 121°11.8′E
- UN/LOCODE: PHCLP

Details
- Operated by: Philippine Ports Authority
- Size: ~75,000.00 square metres (807,293.3 sq ft)
- No. of berths: ~7

Statistics
- Vessel arrivals: 21,264 (2013)
- Annual cargo tonnage: 109,005 (2013)
- Passenger traffic: 5,446,663 (2013)
- Website http://www.pdosoluz.com.ph/

The Port of Calapan (Filipino: Pantalan ng Calapan) or the Calapan Baseport, and locally known as Calapan Pier and San Antonio Pier, is a seaport located in Barangay San Antonio, Calapan, Oriental Mindoro, Philippines. The Port of Calapan is the largest and busiest seaport on Mindoro Island. The port has at least seven berths which can accommodate fastcraft, conventional and RoRo vessels.

Primary items handled at the port are agricultural products such as copra, rice, and bananas for outgoing cargo and cement, fertilizer and general commodities for incoming cargo.

== History ==
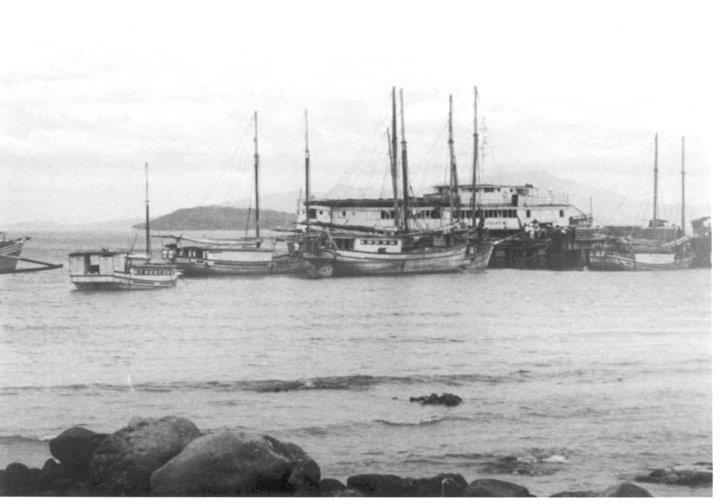
Calapan Port in the 1950's

During most of the Spanish colonial period, Calapan was primarily served by informal bangka (outrigger boat) services that landed along its shoreline, as no formal port infrastructure existed at the time. By the late 19th century, a small wooden pier with a roof was constructed to accommodate larger vessels arriving from Manila and Batangas. Smaller boats continued to unload cargo directly along the town center via the San Vicente River, which served as a key transport route into the settlement.

During the American colonial period, the port was formally opened and integrated into inter-island maritime trade networks. From this period onward, the Port of Calapan underwent gradual expansion and modernization, eventually becoming the principal gateway of Mindoro.

== Location ==
The Port of Calapan is located along Calapan Bay in Barangay San Antonio, Calapan, Oriental Mindoro, Philippines. It is situated on a slightly elevated coastal peninsula extending into the bay. The port lies within the Verde Island Passage, a key maritime corridor between Luzon and Mindoro that is widely recognized for its high marine biodiversity.

It is approximately 28 nautical miles (52 km; 32 mi) from the nearest point of Batangas, around 45 km (28 mi) south of Batangas City, and about 130 km (81 mi) south of Manila across the Verde Island Passage.

The port is directly connected to Calapan city proper via Quezon Drive and National Route 455 (N455), with a dedicated one-way port access road of approximately 500 meters linking the terminal to the main highway network.

== Facilities and Services ==
The Port of Calapan is an approximately 75,000-square-meter complex comprising key facilities such as a Law Enforcement Building (LEB), Port Operations Building (POB), at least 7 berths, a land transportation terminal serving various towns on the island and destinations within the city, and four access gates.

The Passenger Terminal Building (PTB), inaugurated in March 2023, is currently the largest seaport passenger terminal in the Philippines in terms of capacity, with a floor area of 8,124-square meters. It has a stated capacity of 3,500 passengers but can accommodate up to approximately 4,000 passengers when necessary.

At present, the Port of Calapan primarily serves routes connecting Oriental Mindoro with Batangas in mainland Luzon. Major shipping companies operate frequent passenger services between Calapan and Batangas Port, with departures running throughout the day. Montenegro Shipping Lines and Starlite Ferries provide high-frequency RoRo Ferry trips on alternating schedules, while other operators, including FastCat, OceanJet, and SuperCat, offer additional scheduled ferry and fastcraft services at regular intervals.

In addition to these primary routes, limited services are operated by smaller vessels like the motor bangka M/B Anyayahan that provides services between Calapan and Lobo, Batangas, typically with one scheduled departure per operating day.

The port also serves as a major transit point for integrated interprovincial bus services linking Metro Manila with southern Mindoro and destinations in the Visayas and Mindanao, such as the cities of Iloilo and Davao.

== Future Development Plans ==
Following the inauguration of the new Passenger Terminal Building (PTB) in 2023, several additional expansion and modernization projects for the Port of Calapan were announced by the Philippine Ports Authority (PPA). Planned developments include the expansion of cargo yards for various types of freight, additional berthing and terminal facilities for vessels, passengers, and rolling cargoes, as well as the widening of the port access road. The road expansion is also expected to complement the development of the proposed Calapan Boardwalk project of the Oriental Mindoro provincial government.

To date, the port remains under ongoing expansion, with several structures within the port complex under construction, including a new ticketing building and an expanded port operations area located on the southern portion of the complex.

The port is also proposed to expand its inter-island maritime connectivity through the opening of new RoRo ferry routes linking Calapan with other provinces in the MIMAROPA region, including Marinduque, Romblon, and Palawan.
