= City College of Calapan =

Public college in Oriental Mindoro, Philippines

Coordinates: 13°22′45″N 121°11′03″E

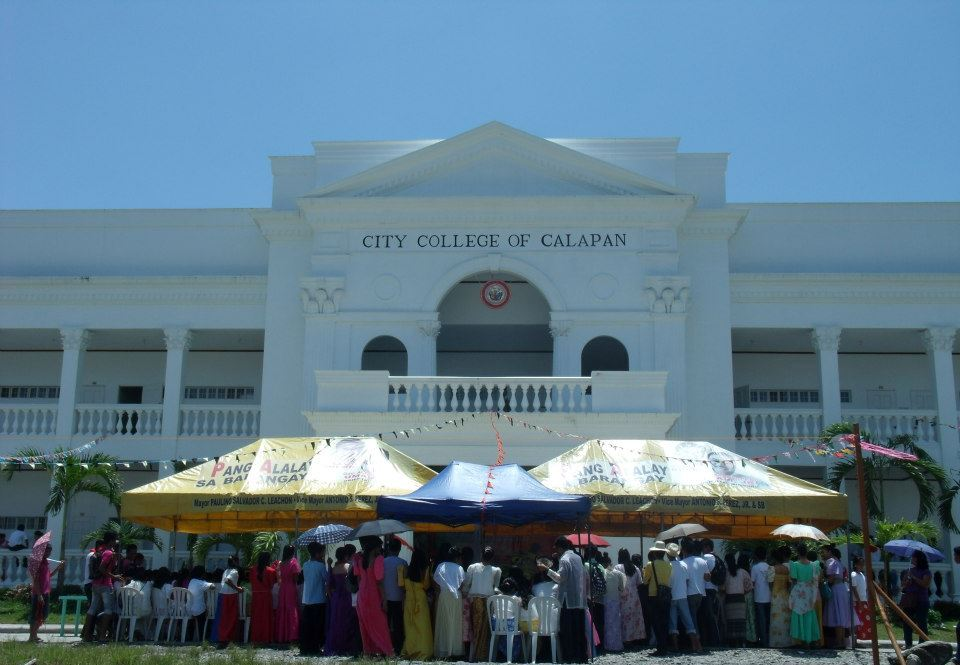

The City College of Calapan or otherwise known as the Dalubhasaan ng Lungsod ng Calapan is a public institution of higher learning located in Guinobatan, Calapan, Oriental Mindoro in the Philippines. It was established in 2008 through the initiative of the then City Mayor Paulino Salvador Leachon under the education endeavors of his “Ang Bagong Calapan” and “Aksyon Agad” Programs. The college was made operational through the passing of Resolution No. 431 City Ordinance No. 14 authored by Councilor Jojie Malapitan.

The first batch of students was housed in the old city hall in Ibaba East when the City Government Center was transferred into its present site which is also in Guinobatan. Now the building only serves as an annex building for 3rd and 4th year students while the new main building in Guinobatan caters to the 1st and 2nd year students.

The City Government is working to make City College of Calapan as a “Center of Excellence” not only in the city but in the entire province.

== Courses ==
To date, the CCC offers the following:

- Bachelor of Science in Information Systems
- Bachelor of Science in Hotel and Restaurant Management
- Bachelor of Science in Tourism Management
- Bachelor of Elementary Education
- Bachelor of Secondary Education (Physical Science / Mathematics)
- Bachelor of Library and Information Science
