= Archipelago Philippine Ferries Corporation =

Philippine ferry company

Archipelago Philippine Ferries Corporation (FastCat)
- Trade name: FastCat
- Industry: Shipping
- Founded: 2003; 23 years ago
- Headquarters: Muntinlupa, Philippines
- Area served: Philippines
- Key people: Dennise C. Trajano (Chairman); Christopher “Chet” S. Pastrana (President and CEO); Mary Ann I. Pastrana (EVP and Treasurer)
- Services: Passenger and cargo ferry transport
- Website: fastcat.ph

Archipelago Philippine Ferries Corporation (APFC) is a ferry company based in Muntinlupa, Metro Manila, Philippines. It serves passenger and cargo routes serving select seaports in the Philippines with its fleet of catamaran Roll-on/Roll-off (RoRo) ferries. It also operates ports and terminals.

== History ==
Archipelago Philippine Ferries Corporation's (APFC) history traces back in the early 1990s, when Christopher S. Pastrana finds the sailing condition when he travels by sea to his father's hometown, in Matnog, Sorsogon as pitiable. He operates Capp Group of Companies a firm that transport bulk cargo primarily for the fertilizer industry. His company later acquires the whole Ro-Ro division of bus firm, Philtranco.

APFC was incorporated in 2002 and initially operated as Maharlika for 11 years until 2013 when it underwent a rebrand.

In 2004, the Philippine government invited the firm to be part of the Road-RoRo Terminal System-Strong Republic Nautical Highway project of the government. The fleet of APFC was upgraded in 2010, when it partnered with Australia-based Sea Transport Solutions to acquire 10 Ro-Ro vessels. With the acquisition of the vessels, APFC became the first ferry company in the Philippines to operate catamaran-type Ro-Ro vessels. The firm also became involved in the modernization of Philippine ports in the east and west sea corridor.

In 2015, it was reported that APFC's operations in the country were 65 percent for cargo transport and 35 percent for passenger transport.

== FastCat ==
FastCat

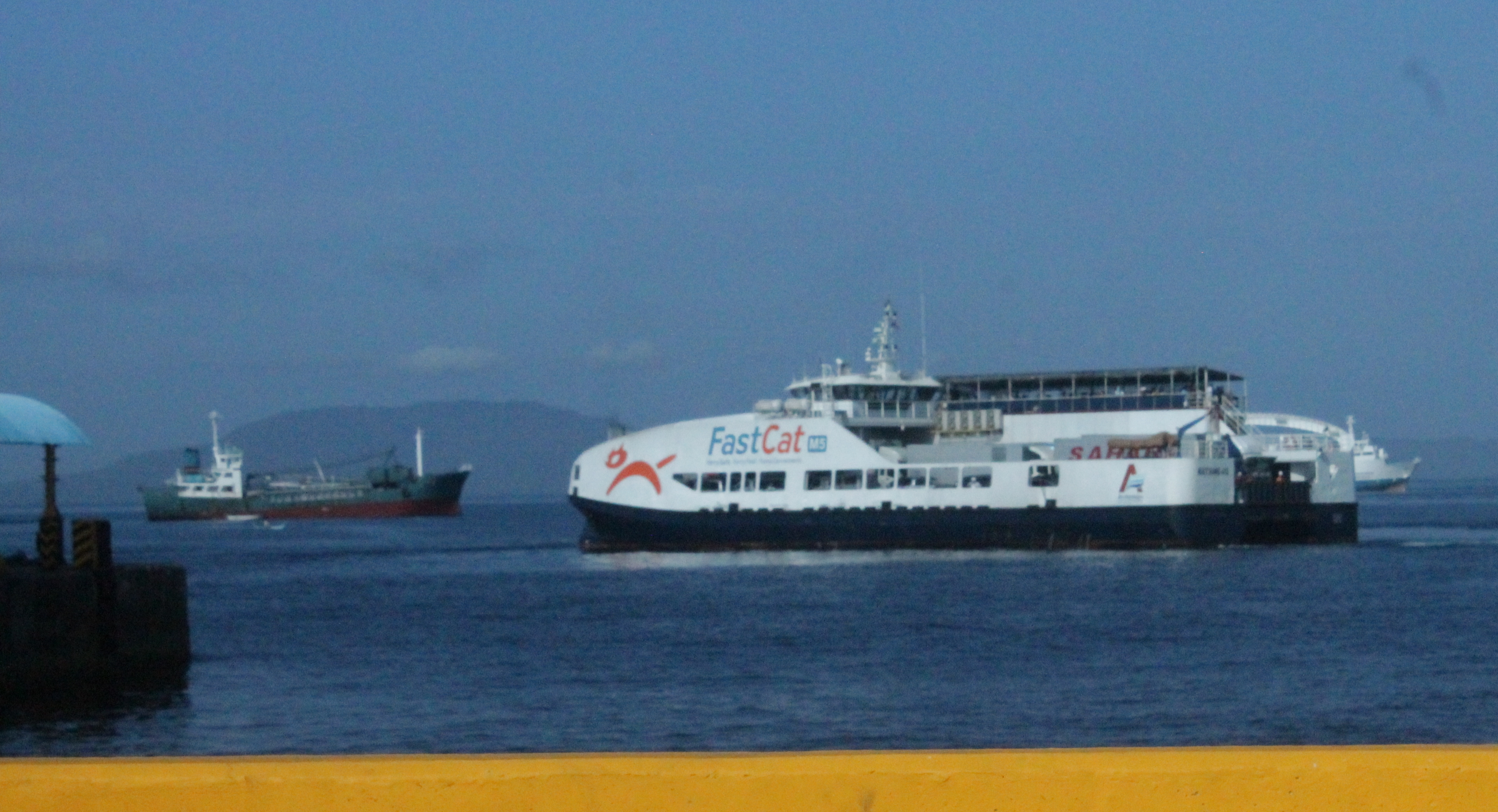
- FastCat M5 at the Batangas International Port
- Current owner: Archipelago Philippine Ferries Corporation
- Country: Philippines
- Introduced: 2013
- Markets: Philippines
- Tagline: "FerrySafe. FerryFast. FerryConvenient."

APFC operates a fleet of catamaran-type Ro-Ro vessels named FastCat. These vessels were designed by Australia-based Sea Transport Solutions and built by China-based Boni Fair Development. The Japan International Cooperation Agency reportedly extended a ₱2.3 Billion sub loan support to APFC for the first ten FastCat vessels.

The ships were specifically designed for climate conditions of the Philippine seas. It ships also has a double hull with 10 watertight compartments, no ballast tanks for stable buoyancy, and a fire security system and a navigation and control systems. The top speed of the vessel is 16.5 knots. FastCat vessels are designed to carry 275-320 passengers with accommodations for the senior citizens and the disabled as well as 30-40 passenger cars and 6-7 trucks or buses.

=== Ro-Ro routes ===
As of January 2026, APFC operates eleven routes. It plans to open routes throughout the country in the Eastern, Central, and Western maritime corridors. The firm plans to establish presence in the Central Visayas market, as well as to connect Palawan to Luzon by connecting the province to Mindoro which in turn will be connected in Batangas. APFC plans to open routes to countries in Southeast Asia namely Malaysia, Indonesia, Thailand and Singapore.

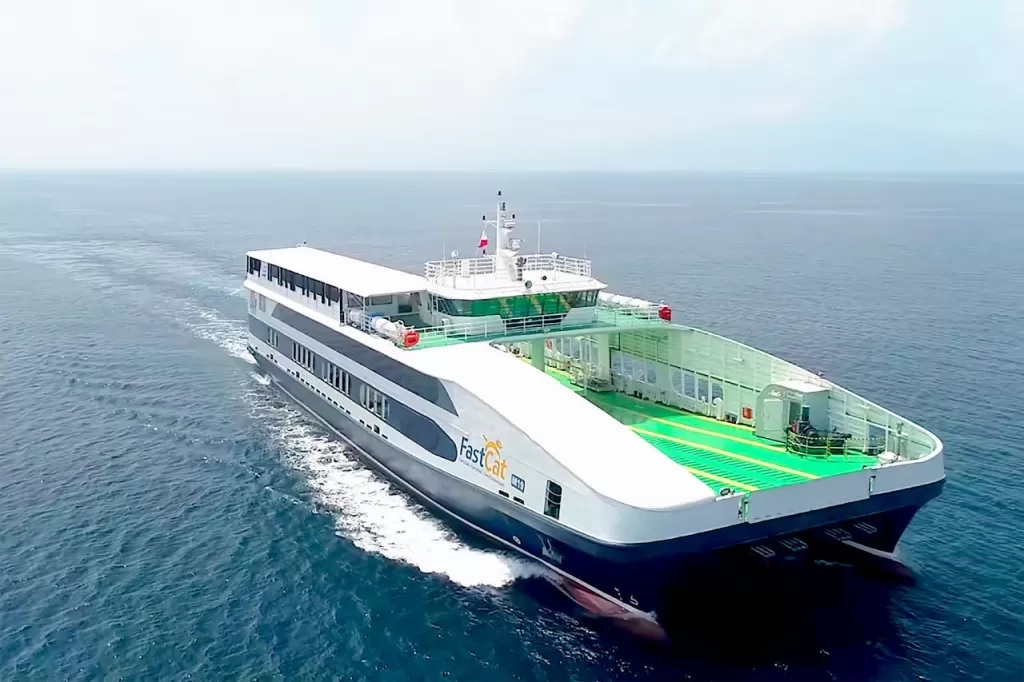
FastCat M19

Present Routes
- Batangas–Calapan
- Bulalacao–Caticlan
- Matnog–Dapdap
- Dumangas–Banago
- Liloan–Surigao
- Maasin-Surigao
- San Carlos–Toledo
- Cebu–Tubigon
- Cebu–Isabel, Leyte (soon)
- Dumaguete–Dapitan
- Zamboanga–Isabela
Reference unless noted otherwise:

Former Routes
- Roxas–Caticlan
- Dipolog–Dumaguete
- Opol–Camiguin–Jagna
Reference unless noted otherwise:

=== Fleets ===
As of January 2024 APFC operates a total fleet of 18 vessels:

Current Fleet

- FastCat M1
- FastCat M2
- FastCat M3
- FastCat M5
- FastCat M6
- FastCat M7
- FastCat M8
- FastCat M9
- FastCat M10
- FastCat M11
- FastCat M12
- FastCat M14
- FastCat M15
- FastCat M16
- FastCat M17
- FastCat M18
- FastCat M19
- FastCat M20

Future Fleet

- FastCat M21
- FastCat M22
- FastCat M23
- FastCat M24
- FastCat M25

=== Incidents ===
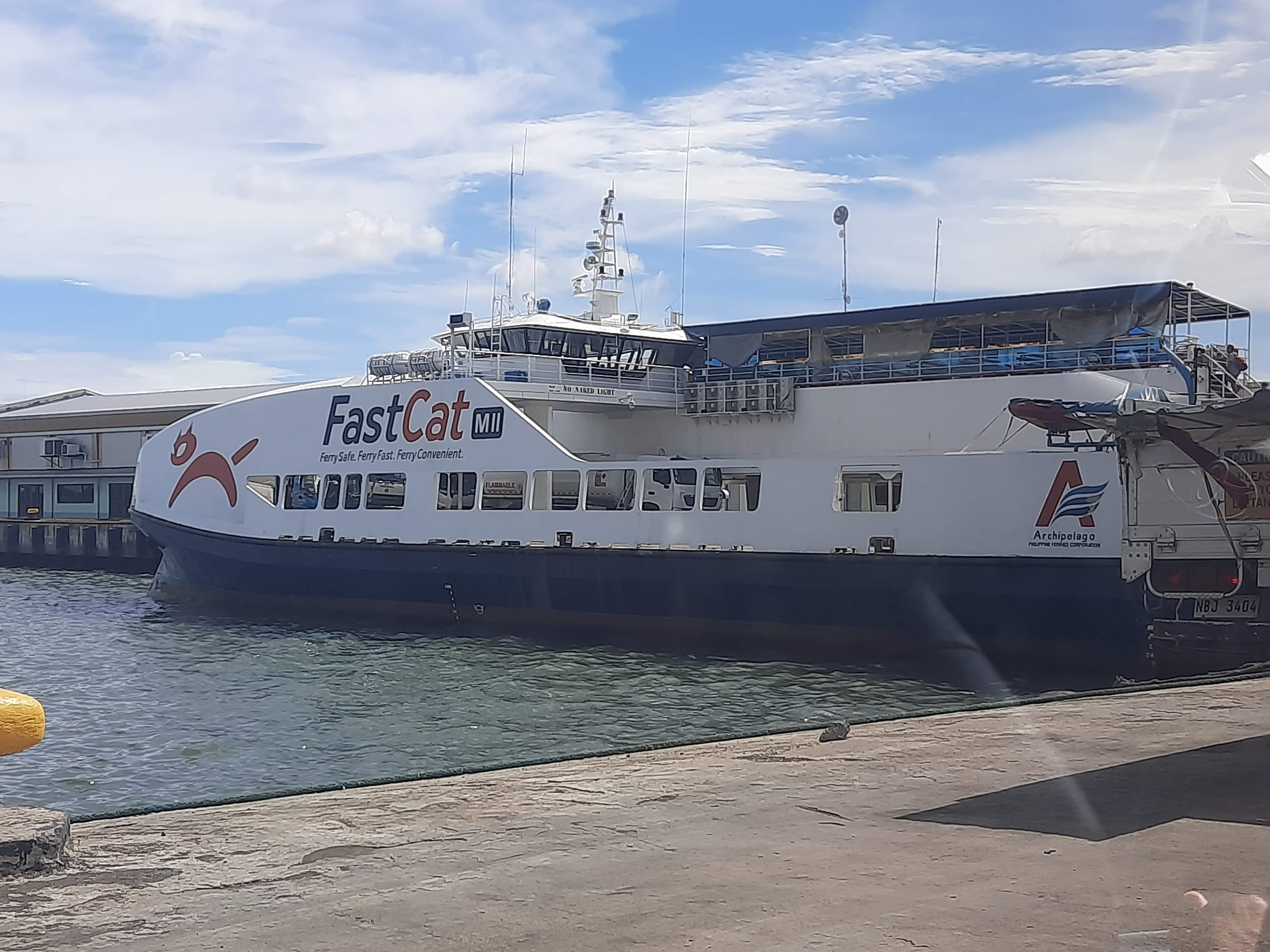
FastCat M11 in Cebu City Pier 3

- On October 18, 2018, MV FastCat M11 was bound for Tubigon from Cebu City when the vessel collided with cargo vessel MV Ocean United of Oceanic Container Lines, Inc. at 8:45 PM at the vicinity of Lawis Ledge off Talisay City, Cebu. Although MV FastCat M11's rear end was damaged, it managed to return to Pier 3 of the Port of Cebu and safely unloaded all its passengers and rolling cargo. Three individuals, including one from the crew, were injured and received medical attention.
- On April 3, 2024, MV FastCat M19 was carrying 41 passengers collided with the barge Krizza Rica near Isla Verde, Batangas. The ferry was en route from Batangas City to Calapan City when the collision occurred. The barge, which was carrying approximately 300 sacks of cement, was being towed by a motor tug at the time of the incident. One passenger, a 26-year-old male, sustained minor injuries. The starboard side of the ferry’s third passenger deck was damaged. No reports of oil spills or major environmental hazards were noted. All passengers were safely evacuated and the ferry successfully docked at Calapan Port.
