= N. V. M. Gonzalez =

Filipno novlest (1915–1999)

NVM Gonzalez
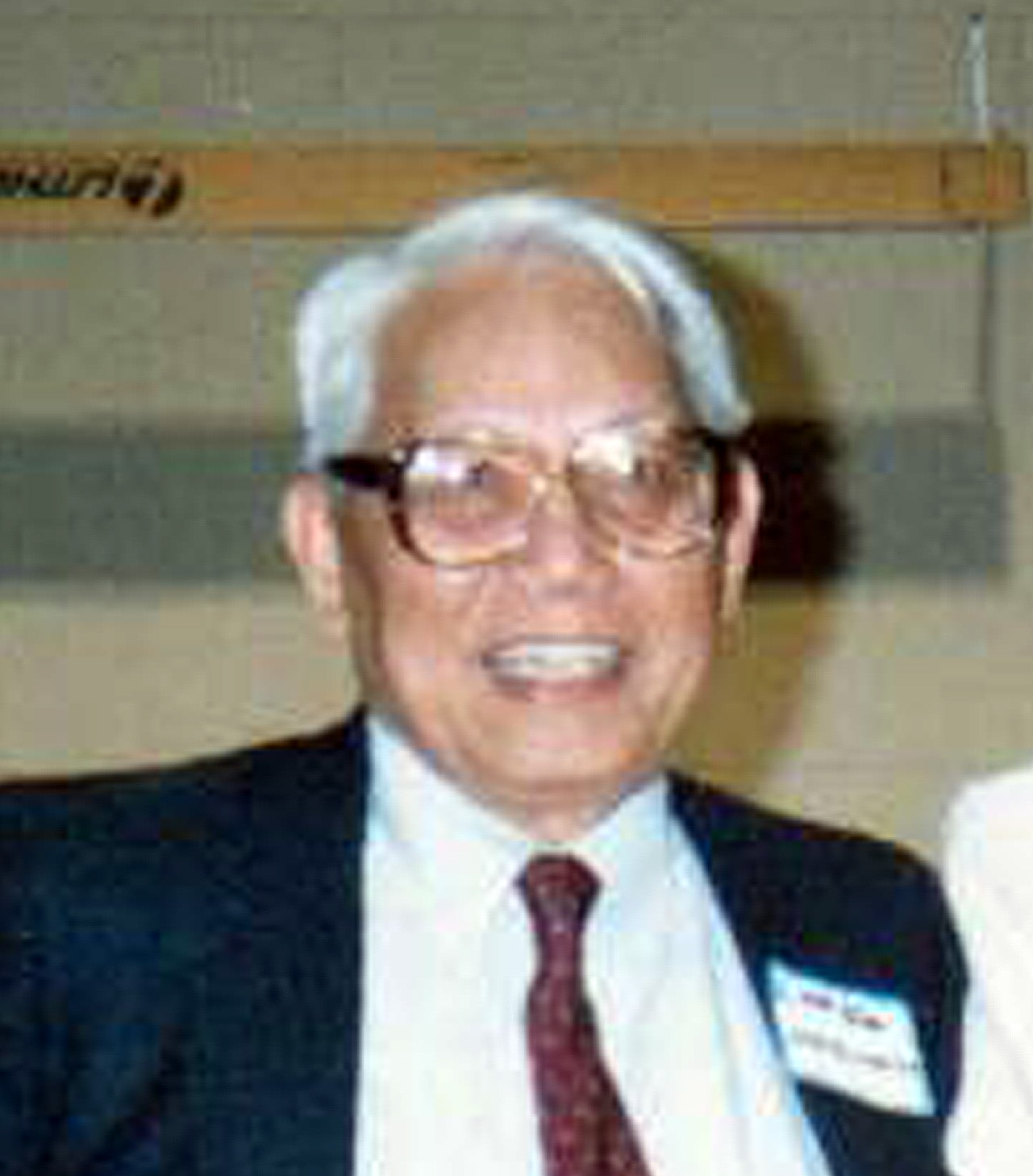
- Born: 8 September 1915; Romblon, Philippine Islands
- Died: 28 November 1999 (aged 84); Quezon City, Metro Manila, Philippines
- Education: National University (Dropped out)
- Occupations: Teacher; author; journalist; essayist
- Spouse: Narita Manuel Gonzalez
- Writing career
- Language: English
- Notable awards: Order of National Artists of the Philippines, Rockefeller Foundation Fellowship, Palanca Memorial Award for Literature, and City of Manila Medal of Honor

Nestor Vicente Madali Gonzalez (September 8, 1915 – November 28, 1999) was a Filipino novelist, short story writer, essayist, and poet. Conferred as the National Artist of the Philippines for Literature in 1997.

== Biography ==
He was born on September 8, 1915 in Romblon, Philippines. González, however, was raised in Mansalay, a southern town of the Philippine province of Oriental Mindoro. González was a son of a school supervisor and a teacher. As a teenager, he helped his father by delivering meat door-to-door across provincial villages and municipalities. González was also a musician. He played the violin and even made four guitars by hand. He earned his first peso by playing the violin during a Chinese funeral in Romblon. González attended Mindoro High School (now Jose J. Leido Jr. Memorial National High School) from 1927 to 1930. González attended college at National University (Manila) but he was unable to finish his undergraduate degree. While in Manila, González wrote for the Philippine Graphic and later edited for the Evening News Magazine and Manila Chronicle. His first published essay appeared in the Philippine Graphic and his first poem in Poetry in 1934. González made his mark in the Philippine writing community as a member of the Board of Advisers of Likhaan: the University of the Philippines Creative Writing Center, founding editor of The Diliman Review and as the first president of the Philippine Writers' Association. González attended creative writing classes under Wallace Stegner and Katherine Anne Porter at Stanford University. In 1950, González returned to the Philippines and taught at the University of Santo Tomas, the Philippine Women's University and the University of the Philippines (U.P.). At U.P., González was only one of two faculty members accepted to teach in the university without holding a degree. On the basis of his literary publications and distinctions, González later taught at the University of California, Santa Barbara, California State University, Hayward, the University of Washington, the University of California, Los Angeles, and the University of California, Berkeley.

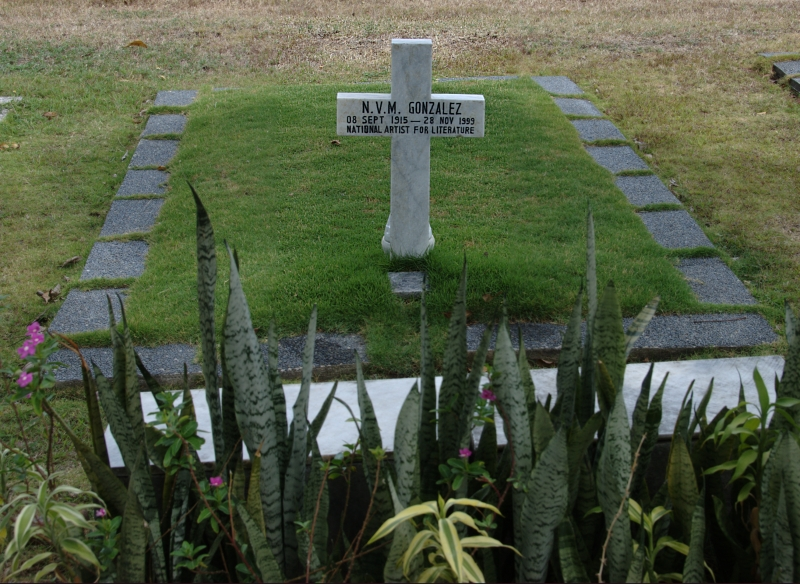
Gonzalez is buried at the Libingan ng mga Bayani.

On 14 April 1987, the University of the Philippines conferred on N.V.M. González the degree of Doctor of Humane Letters, honoris causa, "For his creative genius in shaping the Philippine short story and novel, and making a new clearing within the English idiom and tradition on which he established an authentic vocabulary, ...For his insightful criticism by which he advanced the literary tradition of the Filipino and enriched the vocation for all writers of the present generation...For his visions and auguries by which he gave the Filipino sense and sensibility a profound and unmistakable script read and reread throughout the international community of letters..."

N.V.M. González was proclaimed National Artist of the Philippines in 1997. He died on 28 November 1999 at the age of 84. As a National Artist, Gonzalez was honored with a state funeral at the Libingan ng mga Bayani.

== Works ==
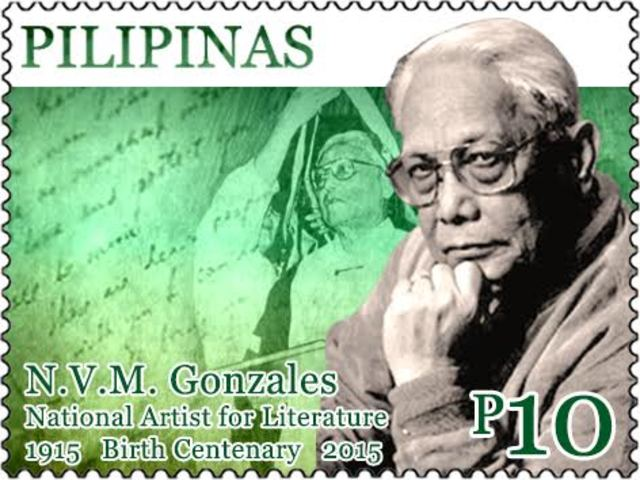
Gonzalez on a 2015 stamp of the Philippines

The works of Gonzalez have been published in Filipino, English, Chinese, German, Russian and Indonesian.

=== Novels/poetry ===
- The Winds of April (1941)
- A Season of Grace (1956)
- The Bamboo Dancers (1988)
- The Land and the Rain
- The Happiest Boy in The World
- Bread of Salt
- Song

=== Short fiction ===
- "The Tomato Game".1992
- A Grammar of Dreams and Other Stories. University of the Philippines Press, 1997
- The Bread of Salt and Other Stories. Seattle: University of Washington Press, 1993; University of the Philippines Press, 1993
- Mindoro and Beyond: Twenty-one Stories. Quezon City: University of the Philippines Press, 1981; New Day, 1989
- Selected Stories. Denver, Colorado: Alan Swallow, 1964
- Look, Stranger, on this Island Now. Manila: Benipayo, 1963
- Children of the Ash-Covered Loam and Other Stories. Manila: Benipayo, 1954; Bookmark Filipino Literary Classic, 1992
- Seven Hills Away. Denver, Colorado: Alan Swallow, 1947

=== Essays ===
- A Novel of Justice: Selected Essays 1968–1994. Manila: National Commission for Culture and the Arts and Anvil (popular edition), 1996
- Work on the Mountain (Includes The Father and the Maid, Essays on Filipino Life and Letters and Kalutang: A Filipino in the World), University of the Philippines Press, 1996

== Awards and prizes ==
- Given a Trophy from A Jokarts company (1997–1998)
- Regents Professor at the University of California at Los Angeles, 1998–1999
- Philippines Centennial Award for Literature, 1998
- National Artist Award for Literature, 1997
- Oriental Mindoro Sangguniang Panlalawigan Resolution "extending due recognition to Nestor V. M. González... the commendation he well deserves..." 1996
- City of Manila Diwa ng Lahi award "for his service and contribution to Philippine national Literature," 1996
- City of Los Angeles resolution declaring 11 October 1996 "N.V.M. González Day, 1996
- The Asian Catholic Publishers Award, 1993
- The Filipino Community of California Proclamation "honoring N.V.M. González for seventy-eight years of achievements," 1993
- Ninoy Aquino Movement for Social and Economic Reconstruction through Volunteer Service award, 1991
- City and County of San Francisco proclamation of 7 March 1990 "Professor N.V.M. González Day in San Francisco," 1990
- Cultural Center of the Philippines award, Gawad Para sa Sining, 1990
- Writers Union of the Philippines award, Gawad Pambansang Alagad ni Balagtás, 1989
- University of the Philippines International Writer-in-Residence, 1988
- Doctor of Humane Letters (Honoris Causa) from the University of the Philippines, 1987
- Djerassi Foundation Artist-in-Residence, 1986
- Philippine Foreign Service Certificate of Appreciation for Work in the International Academic and Literary Community, at San Francisco, 1983
- Emeritus Professor of English, California State University, 1982
- Carlos Palanca Memorial Award (Short Story), First Prize for 'The Tomato Game,' 1971
- City of Manila Medal of Honor, 1971.
- Awarded Leverhulme Fellowship, University of Hong Kong, 1969.
- Visiting Associate Professorship in English, University of California, Santa Barbara, 1968.
- British Council award for Travel to England, 1965.
- Intemaciones Award for Travel in the Federal German Republic, 1965.
- Philippines Free Press First Prize Award winner for Serenade (short story), 1964.
- Rockefeller Foundation Writing Grant and Travel in Europe, 1964
- Jose Rizal Pro-Patria Award for The Bamboo Dancers, 1961
- Republic Cultural Heritage Award for The Bamboo Dancers, 1960
- Carlos Palanca Memorial Award (Short Story), Third Prize winner for On the Ferry, 1959
- Philippine Free Press Third Prize winner for On the Ferry, 1959
- Republic Award of Merit for "the advancement of Filipino culture in the field of English Literature," 1954.
- Carlos Palanca Memorial Award (Short Story), Second Prize winner for Lupo and the River, 1953
- Rockefeller Foundation Study and Travel fellowship to India and the Far East, 1952
- Carlos Palanca Memorial Award (Short Story), Second Prize winner for Children of the Ash-covered Loam, 1952
- Rockefeller Foundation Writing Fellowship to Stanford University, Kenyon College School of English, and Columbia University, 1949–1950
- Liwayway Short Story Contest, Third Prize winner for Lunsod, Nayon at Dagat-dagatan, 1943
- First Commonwealth Literary Contest honorable mention for The Winds of April, 1940
