= Military history of the Philippines during World War II =

The Commonwealth of the Philippines was attacked by the Empire of Japan on 8 December 1941, nine hours after the attack on Pearl Harbor (the Philippines is on the Asian side of the international date line). Although it was governed by a semi-independent commonwealth government, the United States controlled the Philippines at the time and possessed important military bases there. The combined Filipino-American army was defeated in the Battle of Bataan, which saw many war crimes committed, and the Battle of Corregidor in April 1942, but guerrilla resistance against the Japanese continued throughout the war. Uncaptured Filipino army units, a communist insurgency, and supporting American agents all played a role in the resistance. Due to the huge number of islands, the Japanese never occupied many of the smaller and more minor islands. The Japanese control over the countryside and smaller towns was often tenuous at best.

In 1944, Allied forces liberated the islands from Japanese control in a naval invasion.

== Background ==
On 27 September 1940, Nazi Germany, Kingdom of Italy, and Empire of Japan had allied under the Tripartite Coalition as the Axis powers. The United States banned the shipment of aviation gasoline to Japan in July 1940, and by 1941 shipments of scrap iron, steel, gasoline, and other materials had practically ceased. Meanwhile, American economic support to China began to increase.

Japan and the USSR signed a neutrality pact in April 1941 and Japan increased pressure on the French and Dutch colonies in Southeast Asia to cooperate in economic matters. Japanese forces occupied the naval and air bases of southern French Indochina on 22 July 1941. The Philippines was almost completely surrounded.

General George C. Marshall, US Army Chief of Staff, stated, "Adequate reinforcements for the Philippines, at this time, would have left the United States in a position of great peril, should there be a break in the defense of Great Britain."

A campaign for independence from the US which had been ongoing since 1919 resulted on 17 January 1933 in the passage by the US Congress of the Hare–Hawes–Cutting Act over the veto of President Herbert Hoover. The law promised Philippine independence after 10 years, but reserved several military and naval bases for the United States, as well as imposing tariffs and quotas on Philippine exports. Philippine Senate President Manuel L. Quezon convinced the legislature to reject the bill. Subsequently, the Tydings–McDuffie Act, which eliminated provisions for US military reservations and substituted a provision for "ultimate settlement", became US law on 24 March 1934 and was accepted by the Philippine legislature on 1 May. The impact of this on the future defense of the Philippines with the establishment was to prove disastrous. During the 10-year transition period, the Philippine Constabulary was vested with an ever-increasing responsibility for defending the borders of the Philippines. The forces of the US Army settled at around 10,000 men.

The US Army had, however, already spent millions constructing forts and air strips throughout Luzon. This included the harbor defenses in Manila Bay, at Fort Mills on Corregidor Island and at Grande Island in Subic Bay. There were also bases at Nichols Air Station (now Villamor Airbase), Nielson Air Base (now Ayala Triangle in Makati City—Ayala and Paseo de Roxas Avenues lay over the original landing strips), at Fort William McKinley (now Fort Andres Bonifacio and the American Cemetery), Camp Murphy (now Camp Aguinaldo and Camp Crame) in Quezon City, Camp O'Donnell in Tarlac and a series of airbases and army installations in Pampanga including Fort Stotsenburg, Clark Air Base, as well as Camp Wallace in La Union, the Naval Station in Sangley Point, Cavite City, Camp Keithley in Lanao, Camp Eldridge in Los Baños, Laguna and Camp Henry T. Allen in Baguio. Other fields in Tuguegarao, Aparri, Isabela, Nueva Ecija, Legaspi, Bataan, and Del Monte in Davao were also built using US funds prior to and during the first years of the 1935 provisional Commonwealth.

== The Philippine Army ==
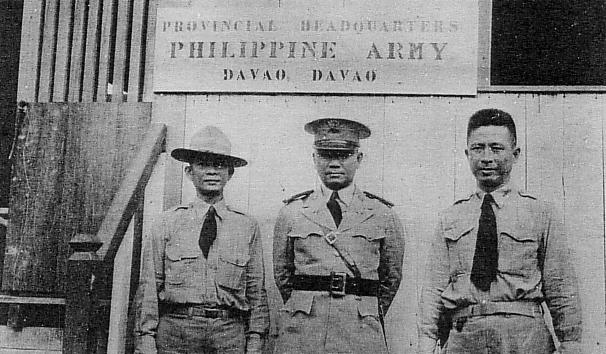
Philippine Commonwealth Army personnel in Davao

The date for Philippine Independence and US military withdrawal was approaching, resulting in a reduction in funds from the US military to directly support the expansion of the Philippine Commonwealth Army. 12 million dollars were provided to the Commonwealth for the establishment of the Philippine Army in 1936. In the early years of the Commonwealth, the Philippine Army was composed of an Active Duty and a Reserve Component. The Active Duty component was the Philippine Constabulary, which was a para-military organization. After the outbreak of the war, this was referred to as the First Philippine Division. Many of the officers of the Philippine Army and Philippine Army Air Corps came from the members of the Philippine Constabulary and Air Constabulary.

== Far Eastern Command ==
On 25 July 1941, US Secretary of War Henry L. Stimson requested that US President Franklin D. Roosevelt issue orders calling the military forces of the Commonwealth into active service for the United States. Stimson explained, "All practical steps should be taken to increase the defensive strength of the Philippine Islands."

The following day President Roosevelt froze all Japanese assets within the United States and issued orders to absorb the forces of the Philippine Army. That same day the War Department created the US Army Forces in the Far East (USAFFE) command, with jurisdiction over the Philippine Department and the military forces of the Commonwealth. At the same time General Douglas MacArthur was recalled to active duty and designated the commander of the USAFFE.

== Naval forces ==
At the outbreak of war the United States Navy's Asiatic Fleet was stationed at Cavite Naval Base in Manila Bay. Also stationed there was the Offshore Patrol.

== Mobilization and reinforcement ==
MacArthur ordered the mobilization of the Philippine Army beginning on 1 September 1941. Elements of 10 Filipino reserve divisions were to be called into the service of the United States Army by 15 December. Battalions were not organized by the time of the Japanese invasion in December. However, a force of a hundred thousand or more Filipinos was raised.

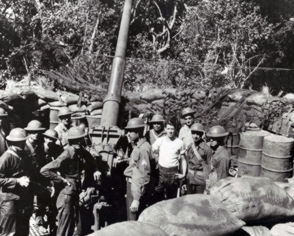
200th Coastal Artillery, New Mexico Army National Guard on Luzon

On 14 August Brigadier General Leonard T. Gerow argued that the Philippine Department could not resist a Japanese attack. He thus recommended that the Philippines be reinforced with anti-aircraft artillery, modern aircraft and tanks. On 16 August, MacArthur was informed that by 5 September he could expect the 200th Coast Artillery Regiment (AA), the 192nd and 194th Tank Battalions and a company of the 17th Ordnance Battalion.

On 5 September Marshall asked MacArthur if he wanted a National Guard Division, probably the 41st. MacArthur replied that he did not need any additional divisions. He also stated, "Equipment and supplies are essential. If these steps are taken, I am confident that no such backing, the development of a completely adequate defense force will be rapid."

During September and October, in addition to the above-mentioned reinforcements, MacArthur received the 192nd Tank Battalion and 75 self-propelled 75 mm guns.

MacArthur strove to reorganize the Philippine Division from a square into a triangular formation. This plan involved shipping in an American infantry regiment and or complementing Stotsenburg and allow USAFFE control of 2 American combat teams. These plans also involved the formation of four tactical commands, each of corps strength, along with various additional support units.

By November the War Department had approved additional reinforcements of 1,312 officers, 25 nurses and 18,047 men. The 34th Infantry Regiment was scheduled to ship out from San Francisco on 8 December 1941. By 5 December fifty-five ships were en route from San Francisco carrying 100,000 ship-tons of cargo to the Philippines. On board were the personnel and equipment of the 26th Field Artillery Brigade, including the 147th Field Artillery, 75 mm, Truck Drawn, Regiment of the South Dakota National Guard; the 148th Field Artillery, 75 mm, Truck Drawn, Regiment of the Idaho National Guard and the 2nd Battalion of the 131st Field Artillery, 75 mm, Truck Drawn, Regiment of the Texas National Guard. These units were diverted to Hawaii and assigned to its defenses.

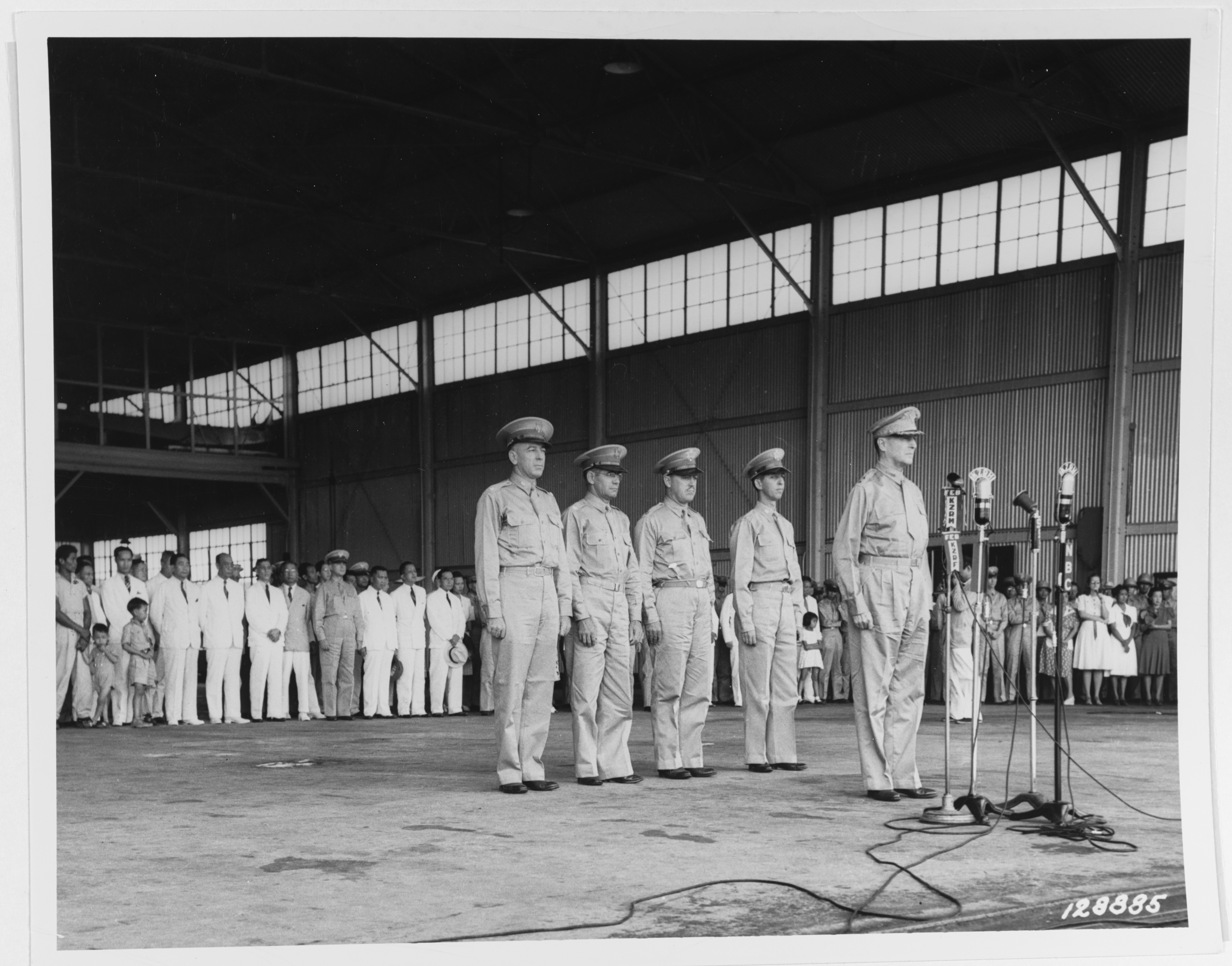
MacArthur at the induction of the Philippine Army Air Corps

When the Japanese attack on Pearl Harbor took place, there were several air elements en route. This included 52 A-24 Banshee dive bombers of the 27th Bombardment Group, eighteen P-40s of the 35th Pursuit Group, 340 tons of bombs and 9,000 drums of aviation fuel. There were also two light field ground echelons of the 7th Bombardment Group, which arrived in the Philippines and were relocated to Mariveles after the evacuation of Manila. The air echelon squadrons of the 7th were en route to the Philippines and arrived in Pearl Harbor on the morning of 7 December 1941. They consisted of 9th, 463rd, 492nd, and 493d Heavy Bombardment Squadrons. The air echelon was diverted back to the US and then routed to Java through Australia.

== Material and training inadequacies ==
The Philippine Army received clothing that was of poor quality. Their rubber shoes would wear out within 2 weeks. There were shortages of nearly every kind of equipment such as blankets, mosquito bars, shelter halves, entrenching tools, gas masks, and helmets.

During August, MacArthur had requested 84,500 M1 Garand rifles, 330 .30-caliber machine guns, 326 .50-caliber machine-guns, 450 37mm guns, 217 81 mm mortars, 288 75 mm guns, and over 8,000 vehicles. On 18 September, he was informed that, because of lend-lease commitments, he would not receive most of these items. As a result, the Philippine Army was forced to continue using the old Enfield and Springfield rifles.

The shipment of supplies depended upon the US Navy's limited cargo capacity. In September, the Navy announced its intentions to convert three transports into escort carriers, but this was not done after MacArthur observed that the loss of three transports would delay his reinforcements by more than two months.

The army then approved requests for 105 mm howitzers, 75 mm pack howitzers, 75 mm guns, .30-caliber machine guns, 37 mm guns, ten 250 ft station hospitals, one hundred and eighty sets of regimental infirmary equipment, jeeps, ambulances, trucks and sedans. By November, there were 1,100,000 tons of equipment, intended for the Philippines, piled up in US ports. Most of this never reached its destination. Meanwhile, the Navy did manage to transport 1,000,000 gallons of gasoline to the island. Much of this fuel would be stored on the Bataan Peninsula.

In 1941, many Filipino units went into battle without ever having fired their weapons. Many of the troops had also never even seen an artillery piece fired. The 31st Infantry Division (PA) signal officer was unable to establish radio communication with other units in the same camp. The commander of the Philippine 31st Infantry Division, Colonel Bluemel stated, "The enlisted men are proficient in only two things, one, when an officer appears, to yell 'attention' in a loud voice, jump up, and salute; two, to demand 3 meals per day."

Training and coordination were further complicated by language barriers. Enlisted Filipinos often spoke one language (such as Bikol or a Visayan language), their officers would speak another (such as Tagalog) and the Americans would speak English. There were some first sergeants and company clerks who could neither read nor write.

== The Japanese decide to attack ==
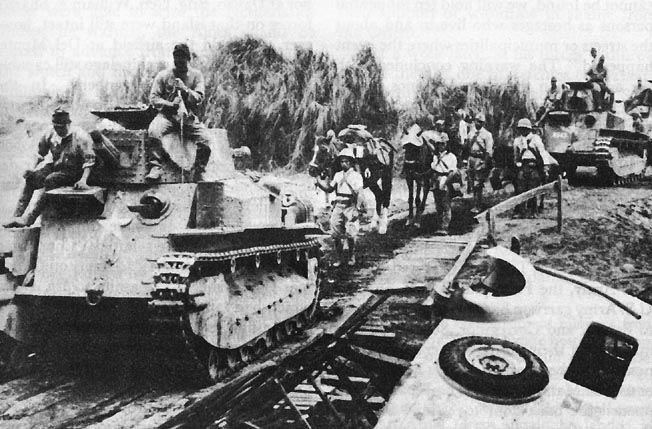
Advancing Japanese troops moving toward Manila.

The Japanese viewed all the lands of Asia to be the rightful property of the Imperial Japanese Government and the Emperor. The seizures of Korea, China and parts of Soviet Union, which had begun at the turn of the 20th century, had been taking an upswing. The Japanese had been kept from realizing their goal of unifying or dominating the Asian lands by the presence of foreign military forces in the Philippines (United States), Hong Kong, Malaysia (United Kingdom) and the Dutch East Indies. Japan had hoped that they could strike fast and hold off reinforcements long enough to broker a peace accord from a position of strength.

Central to the Japanese goals was the taking of all Asian lands. To be successful, US, UK, and Dutch forces were to be attacked simultaneously to prevent their ability to reinforce and aid their Asian possessions. Pivotal to the Japanese decision to attack was a tremendous need for crude oil as a result of economic sanctions imposed by the United States, the United Kingdom and the Netherlands which was weakening the Japanese economy. The Japanese leaders were faced with a choice: end the war in China and their plans for Asian conquest, so as to end the sanctions, or declare war on three large military forces. The current war against Britain, and the Netherlands, and the strain of providing aid by the United States to these countries was seen as an opportunity by the Japanese to extend their "rightful" place as a ruler in Asia.

The Japanese government decided to seize resources under the control of Britain, the United States and the Netherlands. Japan had already placed over ten divisions in Formosa (Taiwan). Japanese military planners argued that the British (and the USSR should they decide to declare war), would be unable to effectively respond to a Japanese attack, given the threat posed by the Third Reich.

== End of Japanese occupation ==
US Navy construction and repair started in March 1945 with the taking of Manila in the costly Battle of Manila ending on 2 March 1945. Naval Base Manila supported the Pacific War and remained a major US Naval Advance Base until its closure in 1971. To support the taking of Naval Base Manila, Leyte Gulf was taken first and base construction started on 20 October 1944. Leyte-Samar Naval Base was made of base on both the island of Leyte and the islands of Samar. The US Naval bases for supported troops, ships, submarines, PT boats, seaplanes, supply depots, training camps, fleet recreation facilities, and ship repair depots. To keep supplies following the bases were supplied by the vast II United States Merchant Navy. After the war ended on VJ Day, Leyte Gulf bases closed and the Naval Base Manila remained a US Naval Advance Base till in 1971. After the Invasion of Lingayen Gulf on 9 January 1945, the Seabees built up a Naval Base Lingayen at Lingayen city and the surrounding gulf. In 1944 and 1945 Japan started using kamikaze attacks on US Navy ships in the Philippines. With two large Naval Bases on Luzon: Naval Base Manila and Naval Base Subic Bay, Naval Base Lingayen was closed after the war. Naval Base Subic Bay, like Naval Base Manila was base of Spain lost to the United States in the Battle of Manila Bay 1898. Subic Bay was lost to Japan in 1941 and retaken in January 1945. Philippine War Crimes Commission was started in 1945 and was dissolved in 1949.

== List of conflicts ==
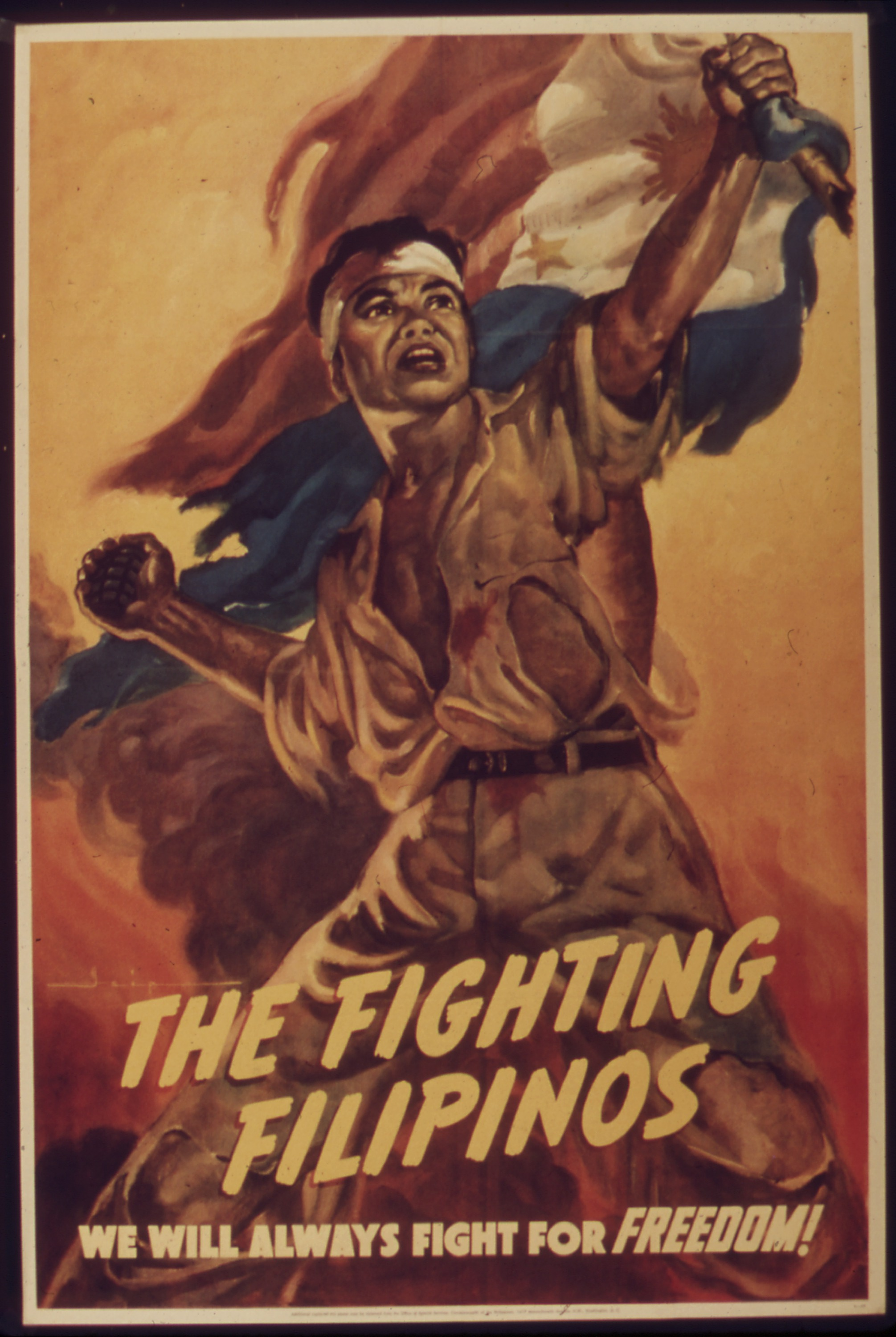
Propaganda poster depicting the Philippine resistance movement

- Japanese invasion of Davao (20 December 1941 to April 1942)
- Battle of the Philippines (1941–42) 8 December 1941 – 8 May 1942
- Battle of Bataan 7 January – 9 April 1942
- Battle of Corregidor 5–6 May 1942
- Battle of Cebu 12–19 May 1942
- Japanese occupation of the Philippines (1941–1945) 8 May 1942 – 5 July 1945
- Philippine resistance against Japan 1941–45
- Battle of the Philippine Sea 19–20 June 1944
- Battle of Leyte 17 October – 26 December 1944
- Philippines campaign (1944–45) 20 October 1944 – 15 August 1945
- Battle of Leyte Gulf 23–26 October 1944
- Battle of Ormoc Bay 11 November – 21 December 1944
- Battle of Mindoro 13–16 December 1944
- Battle of Kirang Pass 1945
- Battle of Maguindanao January to September 1945
- Invasion of Lingayen Gulf 6–9 January 1945
- Battle of Luzon 9 January – 15 August 1945
- Battle of Bessang Pass 9 January 1945
- Raid at Cabanatuan 30 January 1945
- Battle of Bataan (1945) 31 January 1945
- Battle of Manila (1945) 3 February – 3 March 1945
- Battle of Corregidor (1945) 16–26 February 1945
- Battle of Baguio (1945) 21 February 1945
- Raid at Los Baños 23 February 1945
- Invasion of Palawan 28 February – 22 April 1945
- Battle of Mindanao 10 March – 15 August 1945
- Battle of the Visayas 18 March – 30 July 1945
- Battle at Piso Point 14 May 1945
- Battle of Mayoyao Ridge 26 July– 9 August 1945

== See also ==
- Gen. Alfredo M. Santos
- Bataan Death March
- César Basa
- Chick Parsons
- US Naval Base Philippines
- Comfort women
- Commonwealth of the Philippines
- Douglas MacArthur
- Harbor Defenses of Manila and Subic Bays
- Hiroo Onoda
- Hukbalahap
- Jesús A. Villamor
- José P. Laurel
- Manuel L. Quezon
- Military history of Japan during World War II
- Military history of the Philippines
- Military history of the United States
- Naomi Flores
- Nichols Field
- Nielson Field
- Offshore Patrol
- Philippine Commonwealth Army
- Philippine Army Air Corps
- Philippine Department
- Philippine Division
- Roy Anthony Cutaran Bennett
- Second Philippine Republic
- Sergio Osmeña
- The Great Raid
- US Army Forces Far East
- XXIV Corps (United States)
- Wendell Fertig
- Tomoyuki Yamashita
