= Jose Gozar =

Filipino aviator

Jose C. Gozar
- Born: April 8, 1918; Calapan, Mindoro, Philippine Islands
- Died: 1942 (aged 23–24); Tanon Strait, Philippines
- Military career
- Allegiance: Philippines; United States of America
- Branch: Philippine Army Air Corps
- Service years: 1939–1942
- Rank: Lieutenant
- Unit: Philippine Army Air Corps
- Conflicts: World War II; Battle of the Philippines
- Awards: Distinguished Service Cross Distinguished Flying Cross

Jose Protacio Cangco Gozar (April 8, 1918 – 1942) was a Filipino military aviator and a flight officer of the Philippine Army Air Corps, who was awarded at the outbreak of World War II the Distinguished Service Cross.

== Early years ==
Jose Gozar was born on April 8, 1918, in Bgy. Ilaya, Calapan, Mindoro to Juan Gozar and Calixta Cangco. His primary and secondary education were completed in his hometown, and after graduating as batch salutatorian from the Mindoro National High School in March 1936, he entered the University of the Philippines' College of Liberal Arts as a scholar. Upon his graduation he joined the Philippine Army Air Corps and completed his flight qualifications at the Philippine Army Aviation School at Zablan Airfield in Camp Murphy in the class of 1940 and commissioned as a 3rd lieutenant. Lt. Gozar was then assigned with the Philippine Army Aviation School as an instructor pilot, training the last batch of airmen before the outbreak of World War II.

== Military career ==
On December 8, 1941, despite receiving the news on the attack on Pearl Harbor early in the morning, the United States Army Forces in the Far East (USAFFE) and its air component, Far East Air Force (FAEF), were caught by surprise by bombers and fighters of the Imperial Japanese Army and Navy from Takao Airfield in Formosa. By the end of the day, the FAEF's aircraft inventory was reduced by half, with only a few squadrons surviving the initial raid, including the PAAC 6th Pursuit Squadron.

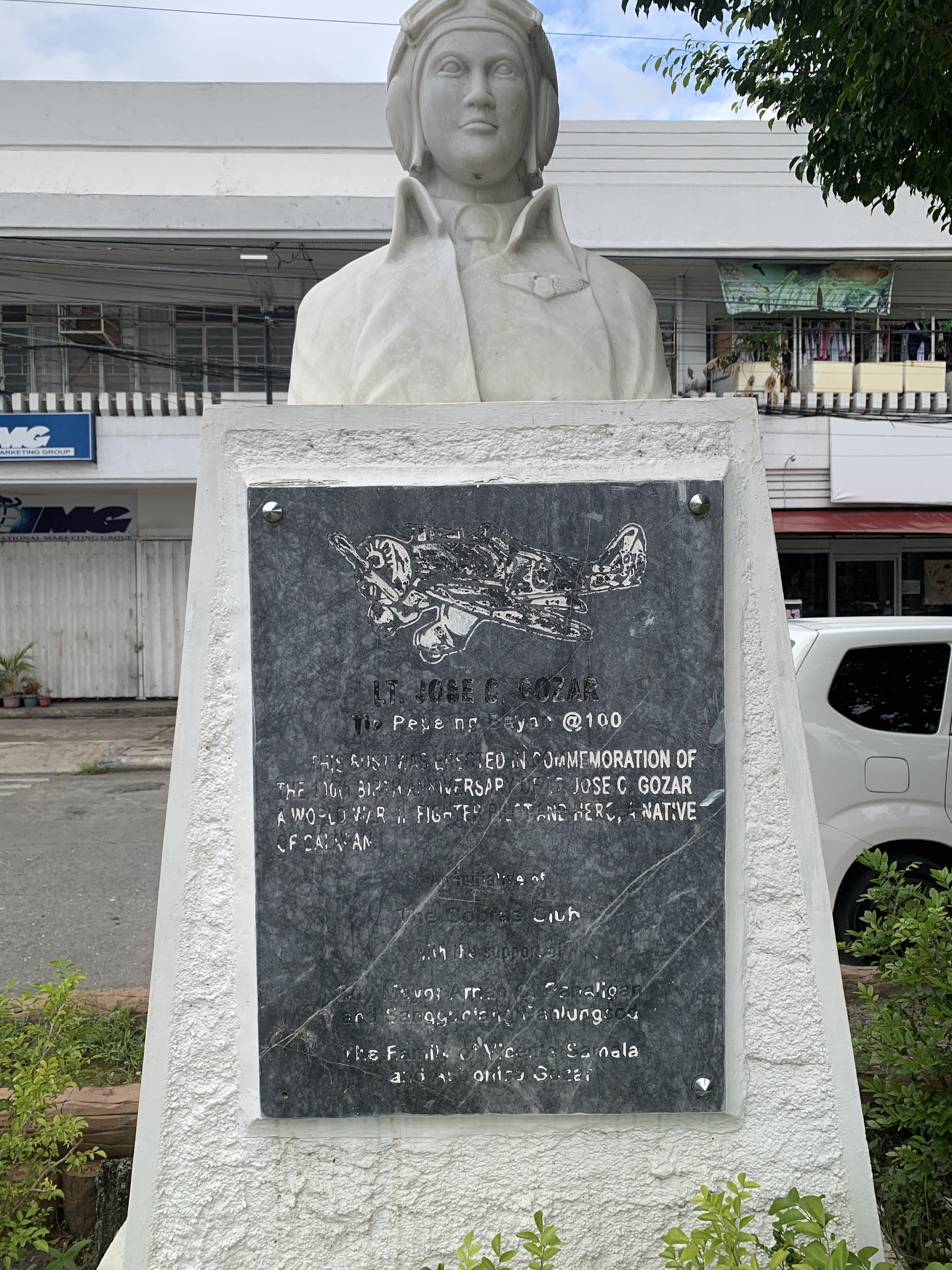
Lt. Jose Gozar's statue in Calapan City Plaza.

At 11:30 am on December 10, while the officers and men of the 6th Pursuit Squadron was having lunch, general quarters was sounded. Capt. Jesus Villamor, along with Lieutenants Godofredo Juliano, Geronimo Aclan, and Alberto Aranzaso of the 6th Pursuit Squadron met another wave of Mitsubishi G3M bombers and Mitsubishi A6M Zero fighters over the skies of Zablan Airfield and Pasig with their Boeing P-26 Peashooters. Lt. Gozar only happened to be in Zablan Field that day, and commandeered an unmanned P-26 and joined the 6th Pursuit Squadron in the defense of Zablan Field.

In the ensuing dogfight, according to accounts and witnesses, Lt. Gozar's guns jammed and he then attempted aerial ramming of an enemy bomber. After a handful attempts by Lt. Gozar, the Japanese airman turned west and left the area. Lt. Gozar's wingman, Lt. Aclan, following the same tactic was also recognized with a Silver Star. Capt. Jesus Villamor in turn was credited for two kills.

The following day, the 6th Pursuit Squadron moved to Batangas Airfield, while Lt. Gozar was left behind with some of the men in Nichols Airfield. On December 12, a force of 27 bombers and 17 fighters targeted Batangas Airfield, and in this aerial battle the PAAC received its first casualty, Lt. Cesar Basa.

The 6th Pursuit Squadron returned to Nichols Airfield on December 13 with four remaining P-26s. The following day another Japanese bombing raid came, and only one aircraft from the 6th Pursuit Squadron was able to scramble, with Lt. Gozar as pilot. Lt. Gozar was able to survive the encounter against three Japanese Zeros with one unconfirmed kill, and land his damaged aircraft.

The accomplishments of Capt. Villamor and the 6th Pursuit Squadron was used by the USAFFE to bolster the morale of the ground troops. On December 15 Capt. Villamor, Lt. Gozar, and Capt. Colin Kelly (posthumously) were personally awarded by Gen. Douglas MacArthur the Distinguished Service Cross for their defense of the airspace above Manila. Lt. Gozar's wingmate, Lt. Godofredo Juliano on the other hand received two Gold Crosses

Upon activation of War Plan Orange, the 6th Pursuit Squadron and the rest of the PAAC were ordered to destroy their aircraft inventory. Lt. Gozar and his unit were ordered to a strategic retreat to Bataan and Fort Mills on Corregidor Island, and transformed their mission to air defense. Lt. Gozar and his fellow townmates, Lt. Salvador Encarnacion and Lt. Arnulfo Acedera who were left in Zablan, found themselves separated from their unit, and proceeded to Bataan on their own. During the early part of the Battle of Bataan, Capt. Villamor and his unit were still hoping to receive new aircraft from Australia. However, the shipment of the Pensacola Convoy never came through. The PAAC was limited then to aerial reconnaissance from Cabcaben Airfield, and anti-aircraft activities.

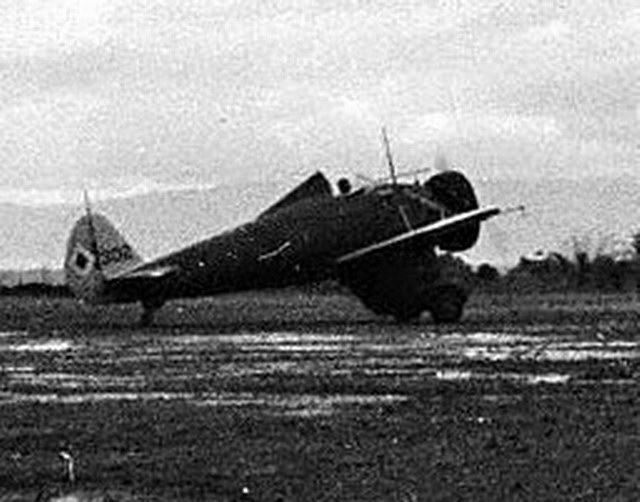
P-26 Peashooter in Zablan Air Field

By April 9, 1942, a day after Lt. Gozar's birthday, the forces under Gen. Edward P. King in Bataan, which included some the men of the PAAC, surrendered to the Japanese Fourteenth Area Army. Lt. Gozar and his unit joined the Bataan Death March, and was incarcerated in the prisoner-of-war camp in Camp O'Donnell, Capas, Tarlac.

In August 1942, Filipino POWs were released by the Japanese, and Lt. Gozar returned to Calapan and regrouped with fellow officers of the PAAC from Mindoro, Lt. Encarnacion and Lt. Acedera. With instructions from Capt. Villamor, Lt. Gozar and his group made an attempt to escape to Australia and report to the South West Pacific Area.

== Death ==
Lt. Gozar and his companions left Mindoro and crossed to Panay, and from there crossed to Negros where they were initially suspected by the local guerillas as spies. They continued in their attempt to reach Mindanao, but weather conditions at the Tanon Strait turned unfavorable. Their small banca became swamped, and thus Lt. Gozar and Lt. Encarnacion, who was a former varsity member of the swimming team of De La Salle University, attempted to swim back to shore, leaving Lt. Acedera. Lt. Acedera was able to survive by hanging on to the banca, and return to shore and report their status. In the next days, it was assumed Lt. Gozar and Encarnacion were both lost at sea, as no trace except for the latter's jacket was found. By late 1945 Lt. Gozar and Lt. Encarnacion were declared dead.

== Awards and recognition ==
For his actions on December 10, 1941, Gozar received the Distinguished Service Cross. Lt. Gozar's citation stated:

Awarded for Actions During World War II

Service: Foreign

Battalion: 6th Pursuit Squadron, Division: Philippine Army Air Corps

Headquarters, U.S. Army Forces in the Far East, General Orders No. 48 (1941)

The President of the United States of America, authorized by Act of Congress July 9, 1918, takes pleasure in presenting the Distinguished Service Cross to Third Lieutenant Jose P. Gozar, Philippine Army Air Corps, for extraordinary heroism in connection with military operations against an armed enemy while serving as Pilot of a Fighter Airplane in the Philippine Army Air Corps, attached to the Far East Air Force, in aerial combat against enemy forces on 10 December 1941, in the Philippine Islands. Lieutenant Gozar engaged one of a greatly superior force of attacking Japanese planes and, when his guns jammed, continued the attack by attempting to ram his opponent. By his display of courage and leadership and after a series of such maneuvered he forced the Japanese plane to flee without further attacks on the airdrome. Third Lieutenant Gozar's unquestionable valor in aerial combat is in keeping with the highest traditions of the military service and reflects great credit upon himself, the Philippine Army Air Corps, and the United States Army Air Forces.

== Legacy and memorials ==
- On October 26, 1955, the Bureau of Posts released issue of a set of two airmail stamps of Lt. Jose Gozar engraved by Waterlow and Sons.

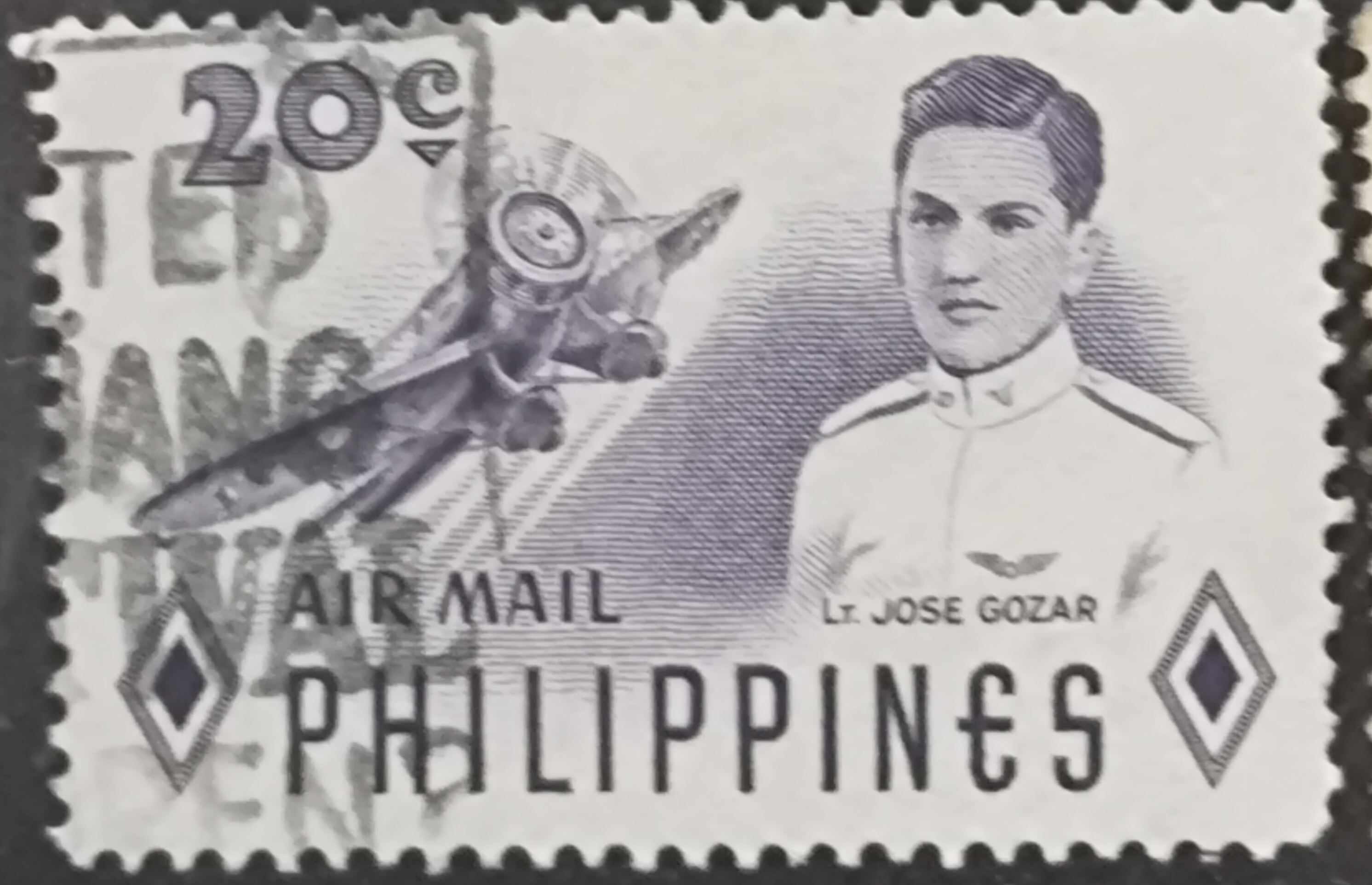
Jose Gozar stamp

- On July 1, 1957, the Philippine Air Force began constructing Lt. Jose Gozar Air Station on Lubang Island, Occidental Mindoro, and the radar station became fully operational on November 16, 1961, w

ith the activation of the 582nd Aircraft Control and Warning Squadron (ACWS). The unit's motto "Ne Quis Perrumpat" [That none breaks true].

- On April 8, 2018, the City of Calapan, Oriental Mindoro through Sangguniang Panglungsod No. 505, recognized Lt. Gozar on his centennial birth anniversary as its Town Hero, and unveiled a marble bust at the Calapan city plaza. During the event, the Philippine Air Force's Air Education and Training Command based in Basilio Fernando Air Base, in Lipa City, Batangas, conducted a fly past and missing man formation.
- The Philippine Air Force Aerospace Museum in Pasay has inducted Lt. Gozar in its Wall of Heroes. Lt. Gozar's name is also listed in the National Museum of the United States Air Force, Akron, Ohio, US.
- A number of streets are named after Lt. Gozar. One in Calapan, another in Naujan, one at the Philippine Air Force's Headquarters at Villamor Air Base, and one at Armed Forces of the Philippines' General Headquarters at Camp Aguinaldo. There is also one barangay and two elementary schools on Lubang Island named after Lt. Gozar.

=== Quotations ===
- "Right now, we are part of God's children who ceaselessly roam because of the war. There are still a lot of people left on earth who wholeheartedly offer shelter to wanderes. So what have we to fear?" – Quote from the last letter of Lt. Gozar to his family in Mindoro.

== See also ==
- List of people who disappeared mysteriously at sea
