= Air corps =

The term air corps can generically refer to an air force, however it is mostly used for an aviation wing within a predominantly land force.

In specific use, air corps or Air Corps may refer to:

- United States Army Air Corps, the predecessor of the United States Air Force
- Army Air Corps (United Kingdom), the air corps of the British Army
- Air Corps (Ireland), the air component of the Defence Forces of Ireland
- Philippine Army Air Corps, the former air corps of the Philippine Army
- Somali Air Corps, the former air corps of Somalia
