= PAAC =

PAAC may be an initialism for:

- Port Authority of Allegheny County, the former name of Pittsburgh Regional Transit
- Philippine Army Air Corps, the predecessor of the Philippine Air Force
