= Curtiss Helldiver =

Curtiss Helldiver may refer to the following aircraft

- Curtiss F8C Helldiver, biplane reconnaissance bomber of the 1920s
- Curtiss SBC Helldiver, biplane scout bomber of the 1930s.
- Curtiss SB2C Helldiver, monoplane dive bomber of the 1940s, known as the Curtiss Helldiver in the Royal Navy

== See also ==
- Helldiver (disambiguation)
- Curtiss (disambiguation)
