= Helldiver =

Helldiver or Hell Divers, may refer to:

== Birds ==
- Grebe, a bird, also called hell-diver
- Common loon, a bird, also called hell-diver

== Arts and entertainment ==
- Helldiver, a graffiti artist better known as ORFN
- Hell Divers, the backing band to American jazz musician Tiny Davis
- Helldivers, a 2015 video game developed by Arrowhead Game Studios
- Helldivers 2, a 2024 video game and sequel to Helldivers, also developed by Arrowhead Game Studios
- Hell Divers, a 1932 American film
- Helldivers Clan, a faction in the miniatures wargame Confrontation (Rackham)
- ARL-99 Helldiver, an airborne assault Mecha in Patlabor: The TV Series

== Military ==
- Curtiss Helldiver (disambiguation), name of several aircraft
- VO-6M, Marine Observation Squadron 6, Hell Divers; a U.S. Marine Corps unit; see List of decommissioned United States Marine Corps aircraft squadrons
- Pelly-Fry's Hell Divers, a flight (subsquadron) from 223 Squadron RAF in WWII commanded by James Pelly-Fry
- Camp Gordon Johnston Helldivers, a WWII U.S. Army football team; see List of World War II military service football teams

== Other uses ==
- Hell Diver, a model of roller coaster from Zierer
