= Curtiss Falcon =

American multirole aircraft

Falcon
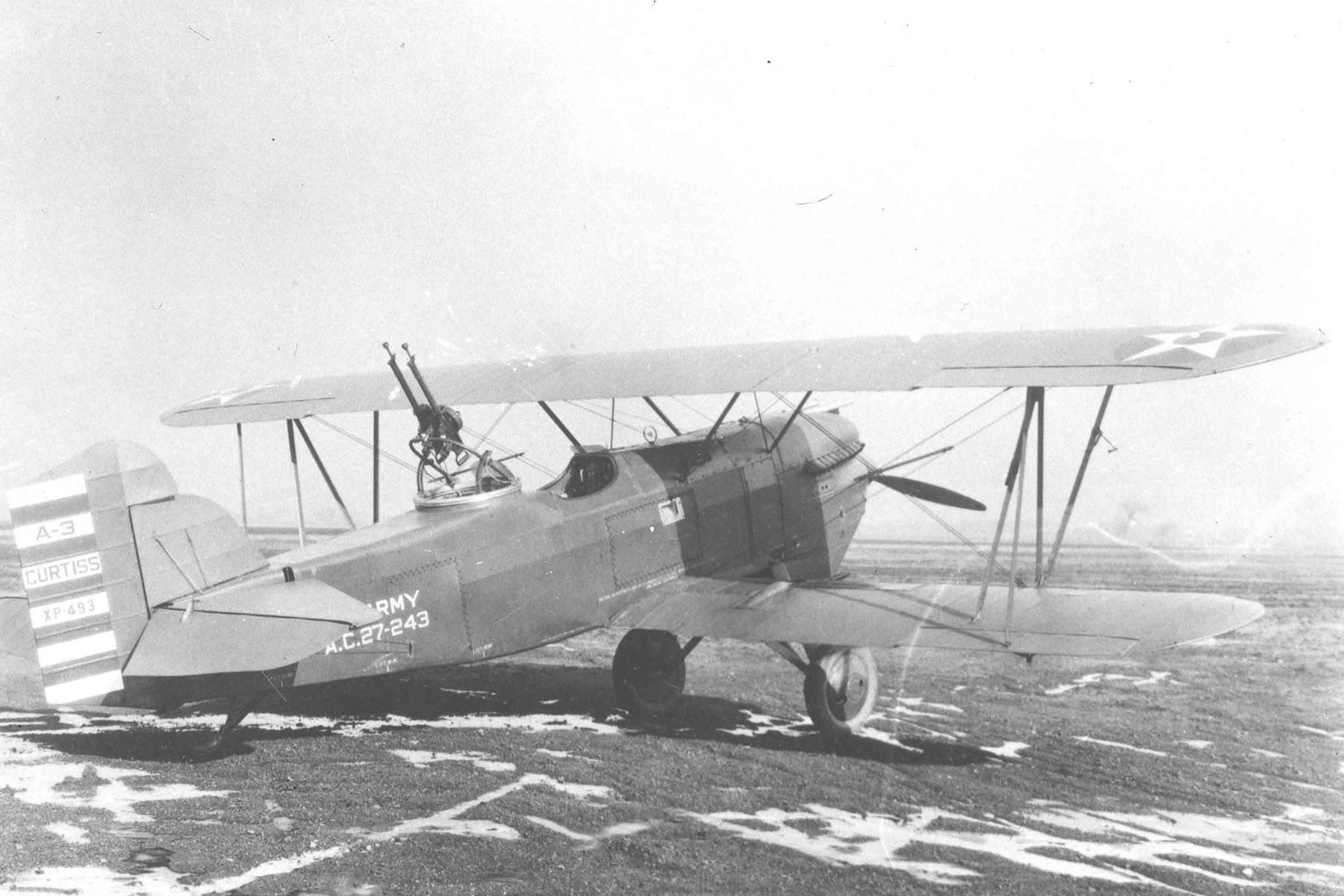
- Curtiss A-3 Falcon. This was the first A-3 aircraft, later converted to O-1B.

General information
- Type: Observation, Attack
- Manufacturer: Curtiss Aeroplane and Motor Company
- Primary users: United States Army Air Corps United States Navy; United States Marine Corps
- Number built: 338 USAAC; 150 USN/USMC

History
- Introduction date: 1925
- Retired: October 1937

The Curtiss Falcon was a family of military biplane aircraft built by the American aircraft manufacturer Curtiss Aeroplane and Motor Company during the 1920s. Most saw service as part of the United States Army Air Corps as observation aircraft with the designations O-1 and O-11, or as the attack aircraft designated the A-3 Falcon.

U.S. Navy variants were used initially as fighter-bombers with the designation F8C Falcon, then as the first U.S. Marine Corps dive bombers with the name Helldiver. Two later generations of Curtiss dive-bombers were also named Helldiver.

The type was introduced in 1925 and saw first-line service in the United States until 1934. Curtiss Falcons fought in the Constitutionalist Revolution of 1932 in Brazil, used by the forces of São Paulo.

== Design and development ==
The Falcon XO-1 prototype was evaluated by the USAAC along with eleven other prototypes in 1924 and the Douglas XO-2 was declared the winner of that competition. So Curtiss re-engined the prototype with the Packard 1A-1500 for the 1925 trials, which it won. The engine failed to live up to expectations and the O-1 ordered by the Army was fitted with the 435 hp (324 kW) Curtiss V-1150 (D-12) engine.

The aircraft was a conventional unequal-span biplane design with wooden wings, while the fuselage was built using aluminum tubing with steel tie rod bracing. The landing gear was fixed and the tail included a balanced rudder with a rear skid originally, later changed to a tailwheel.

The initial A-3 Falcon order was placed in the winter of 1927 and delivery of the first plane was in October 1927. A total of 76 A-3s were received. Later, six aircraft were modified as pilot trainers with dual controls and redesignated A-3A. A second batch of 78 improved A-3Bs, based on the Curtiss O-1E, was purchased beginning in 1929.

== Operational history ==
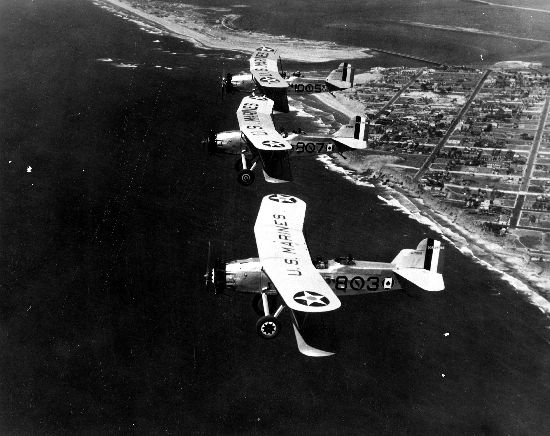
Curtiss OC-2s in flight, c. 1929

Reasonably successful as an observation aircraft, Falcons flew primarily in the 1st, 5th and 99th Observation Squadrons of the 9th Observation Group, Mitchel Field, New York. The A-3 Attack Falcon saw considerable use, in first-line service with the 8th, 13th and 19th Attack Squadrons of the 3rd Attack Group, Barksdale Field, Louisiana, and the 26th Attack Squadron in Hawaii from 1928 to 1934 and second-line service with reserve units until 1937.

The U.S. Navy introduced the F8C-1 and F8C-3 Falcon as a shipboard fighter in 1927–1928. They were later redesignated OC-1 and OC-2 for Marine Corps use as an observation/bomber, due to large carriers not being able to carry medium or heavy bombers. The F8C-4 Helldiver variant initially saw service with the Navy, and the first production batch of 25 was transferred in 1931 to the Marine Corps. A total of 34 F8Cs redesignated as O2C-1 observation aircraft were also transferred to the Naval Reserve in 1931, serving with squadrons VN-10RD9, VN-11RD9, and VN-12RD9. Most of the 63 newer F8C-5/O2C-1 Helldivers also served with the Marines, remaining in service until 1936. The type was featured in multiple Hollywood films: Flight (1929), Hell Divers (1932) and King Kong (1933). Two non-flying replicas were built for King Kong (2005)

Curtiss Falcon aircraft fought during the Brazil Constitutionalist Revolution of 1932, under the flag of São Paulo. In Bolivia, the aircraft type also fought in the Chaco War (1932–1935), bombing Paraguayan troops. The Colombian Air Force used Falcon F-8 and O-1 in the Colombia-Peru War in 1932–3.

== Variants ==
=== U.S. Army Air Corps ===
A-3
Model 44, attack aircraft version of O-1B, armed with two 0.30 in (7.62 mm) machine guns and 200 lb (91 kg) of bombs; 66 built for the USAAC.
A-3A
Six A-3s converted into trainers.
A-3B
Model 37H, attack version of O-1E, with six machine guns, including two mounted in wings; 78 built.

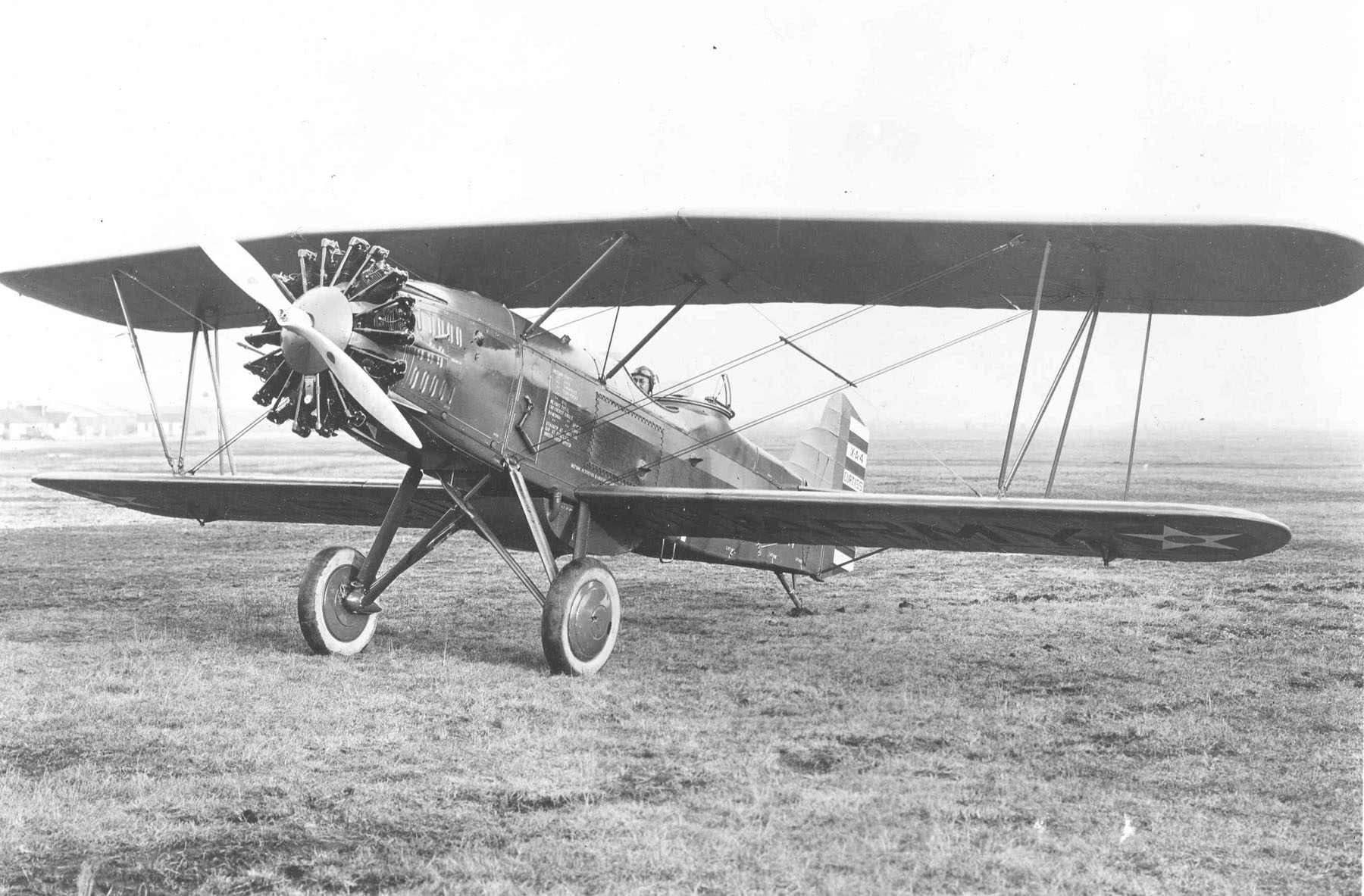
Curtiss XA-4 Falcon

XA-4
One A-3 with a Pratt & Whitney R-1340-1 Wasp radial piston engine. Scrapped in March 1932, but the design was the basis for the naval variants.
A-5
Proposed A-3 variant with Curtiss V-1570 Conqueror engine
A-6
Proposed A-3 variant with Curtiss H-1640 Chieftain engine

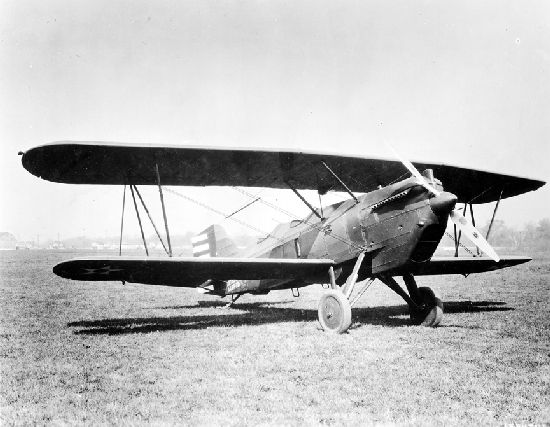
XBT-4

XBT-4
Model 46, one O-1E converted into a basic trainer for the USAAC.
XO-1
Liberty 12A powered Prototype, later modified to use a Packard 1A-1500, one built.
O-1
Model 37A, two-seat observation aircraft, the first production model, ten built. One converted into the O-1 Special VIP transport.
O-1A
Two-seat observation aircraft, powered by the Liberty piston engine, one built.
O-1B
Model 37B, first major production version, powered by Curtiss D-12D (V-1150-3) engine; 45 ordered, 25 built and 20 diverted on the production line to the A-3.
O-1C
Four O-1Bs converted into VIP transports.
O-1E
Model 37I, variant powered by 435 hp (324 kW) Curtiss D-12E (V-1150-5) piston engine; 41 built.
O-1F
Model 37J, one O-1E converted into VIP transport.
O-1G
Model 38, final O-1 variant, powered by a 712 hp (531 kW) Wright R-1820F-2 Cyclone engine; 30 built for USAAC.
XO-11
Two O-1 modified as O-11 prototypes.
O-11
O-1 airframe powered by the Liberty V-1650 piston engine; 67 built concurrently with the O-1s.
XO-12
One XO-11 prototype redesignated XO-12.
XO-13
O-1 fitted with 720 hp (540 kW) Conqueror engine for the 1927 National Air Races.
XO-13A
Second XO-13, fitted with wing skin radiators.
O-13B
One O-1C fitted with a Conqueror engine, tested as an observation aircraft, and provided to Secretary of War.
YO-13C
Three O-1Es re-engined with 600 hp (450 kW) direct-drive Conqueror engines.
YO-13D
One O-11 fitted with supercharged Conqueror engine.
XO-16
One O-11 with Prestone cooling system.
XO-18
One O-1B testbed for Curtiss H-1640 Chieftain engine.
Y1O-26
One O-1E fitted with a geared Conqueror engine.
O-39
O-1G refitted with a Conqueror engine and cockpit canopy; ten built.

=== U.S. Navy and Marine Corps ===
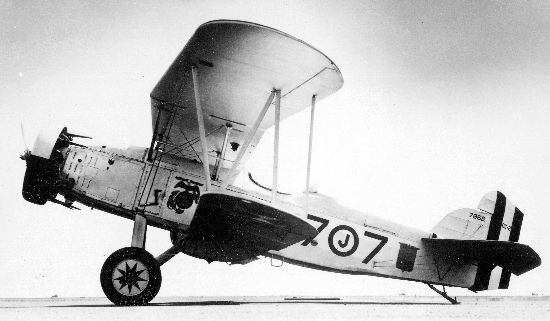
Marine Corps Curtiss OC-2 Falcon, c. 1929

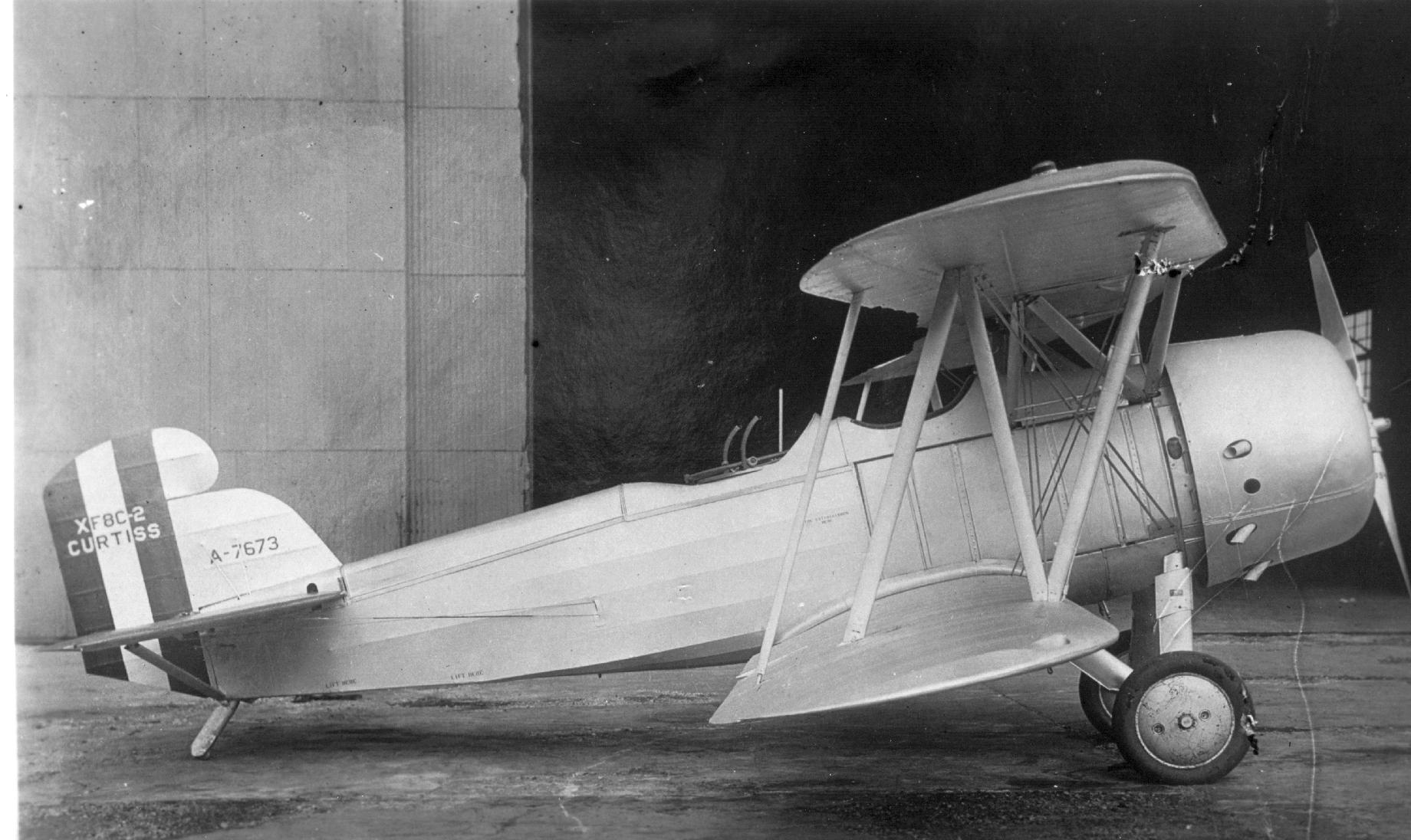
The XF8C-2 prototype

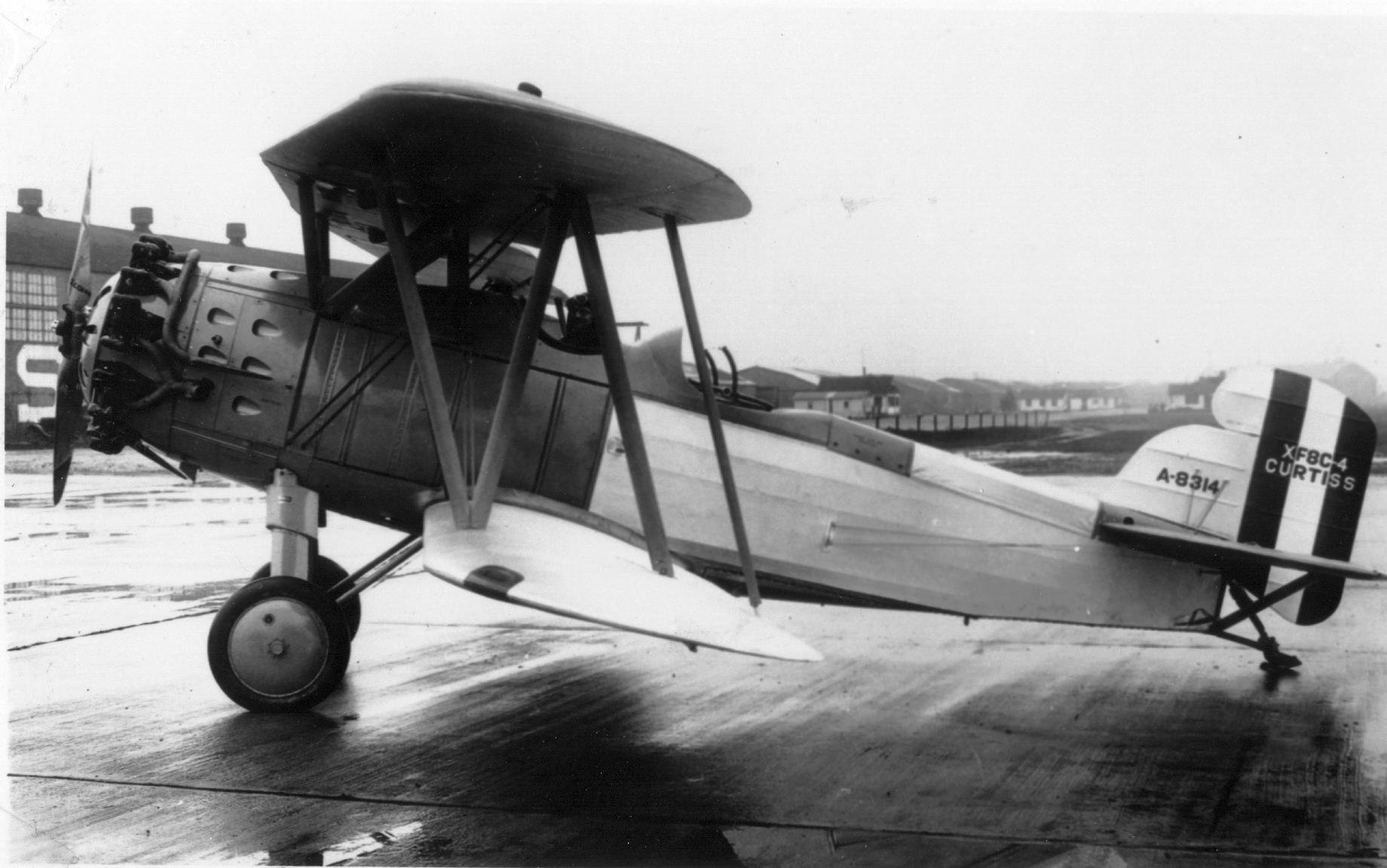
The XF8C-4 prototype

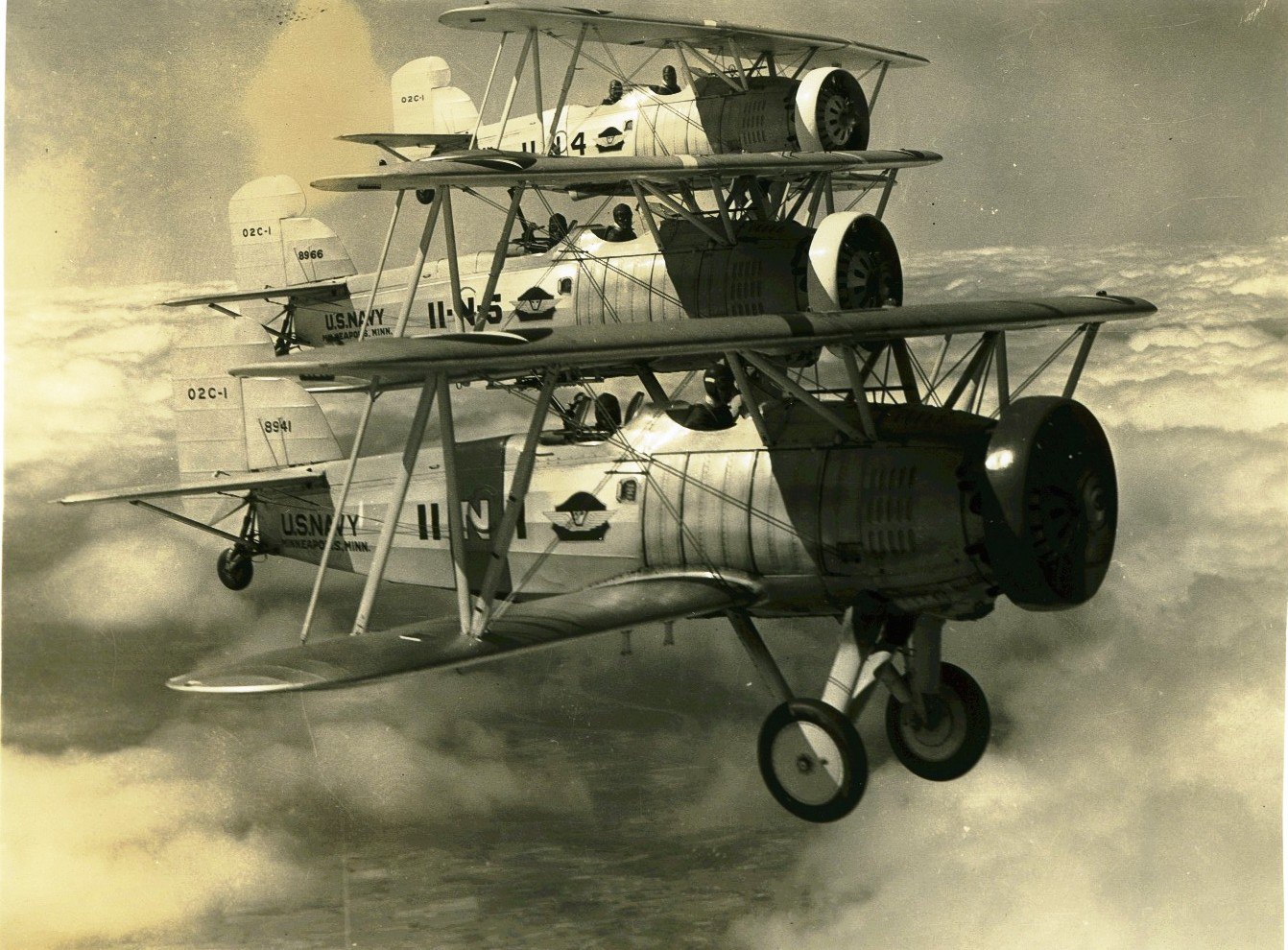
Curtiss F8C-5 Formation, circa 1930

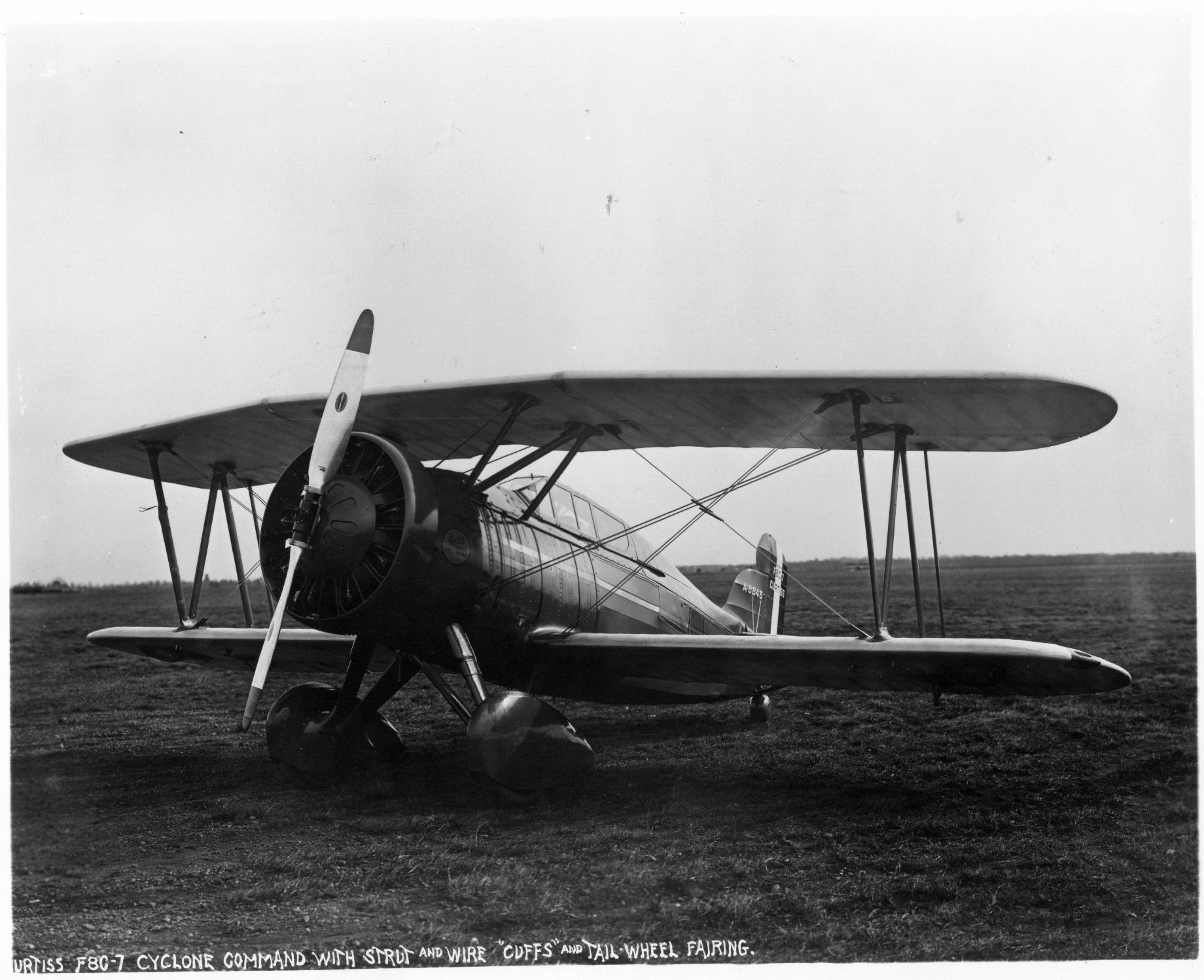
The XF8C-7

A-3 Helldiver
Registry name of XF8C-8, not adopted by USN.
A-4 Helldiver
Civil version of XF8C-8 for use by Assistant Secretary of Navy David Ingalls. Later redesignated XF8C-7.
XF8C-1
Model 37C variant developed from XO-12; two built for the U.S. Navy.
F8C-1 Falcon
Model 37C powered by the 420 hp (310 kW) Pratt & Whitney R-1340 Wasp radial piston engine; four built in 1928 for the U.S. Marine Corps as light bombers, fighters and observation aircraft, later redesignated OC-1.
XF8C-2
Model 49, one prototype for F8C Helldiver. Original crashed on first factory flight and was replaced by Curtiss with a second bearing identical sn.
F8C-3 Falcon
Second production batch of Navy Falcons; 21 built for USN/USMC in 1928, later redesignated OC-2.
XF8C-4
Second Helldiver prototype, modified tail skid assembly.
F8C-4 Helldiver
Model 49B, production dive-bomber variant for the USN/USMC; 25 built, later designated O2C.
F8C-5 Helldiver
Model 49B with ring cowling; 63 built in 1930–31, later designated O2C-1.
XF8C-6
Two F8C-5s modified with superchargers, slats, and wing flaps; one later modified as O2C-2.
XF8C-7
Redesignation of A-4 Helldiver, later redesignated XO2C-2.
XF8C-8
Two prototypes built with canopy-enclosed front cockpit, later redesignated O2C-2.
O2C-1 Helldiver
Redesignation of 63 F8C-5; 30 production O2C-1s in 1931.
O2C-2 Helldiver
Redesignation of XF8C-8s and one XF8C-6.
XOC-3
One XF8C-1 prototype fitted with a Chieftain engine.
XF10C-1
O2C-2 re-engined with a R-1510 engine, also temporary designated XS3C-1.

=== Civil and export ===
Civil Falcon
20 civil versions: Conqueror Mail plane; D-12 Mailplane; Lindbergh Special, sold to Charles Lindbergh; Liberty Mailplane, 14 single-seat mailplanes, powered by a Liberty piston engines, sold to National Air Transport.
Export Falcon
also South American D-12 Falcon. One seaplane version of the O-1B was sold to Colombia, followed by an order for 15 more. Another 10 Model 35Fs were sold to Peru.
Colombia Cyclone Falcon
Model 37F fitted with the 712 hp (531 kW) Wright Cyclone radial piston engine. 100 built for Colombia.
Chilean Falcon
O-1E design built under license in Chile, 10 later sold to Brazil. One example ended up in Paraguay as passage fee for the remaining aircraft. It operated mostly as a VIP transport, but made at last one reconnaissance flight over the Chaco war fields armed with two 7.7 mm (0.303 in) machine-guns from a Potez.
Bolivia Cyclone Falcon
Similar to Colombian Falcon, it was fitted with the 712 hp (531 kW) Wright SR-1820F-2 Cyclone radial piston engine. A total of nine were built for Bolivia in some odd variants from the Colombian ones. Bolivian Cyclone Falcons mounted one frontal .30 MG and most also one rear .30 MG instead of the two wing-mounted ones. Two had semi-cockpit canopies over pilots cockpit; two had windscreens instead of canopy in both cockpits, these two had no ring mount for rear machine gun.

== Operators ==
=== Military operators ===
Bolivia

- Bolivian Air Force

Brazil

- Public Force of São Paulo State
- Brazilian Air Force

Chile

- Chilean Air Force

Colombia

- Colombian Air Force

Finland

- Finnish Air Force

Paraguay

- Paraguayan Air Force

Peru

- Peruvian Air Force

Philippines

- Philippine Army Air Corps

United States

- United States Army Air Corps
- United States Marines
- United States Navy

=== Civil operators ===
United States

- National Air Transport operated 14 aircraft.

== Aircraft on display ==
Although no surviving original examples of the Curtiss Falcon family exist today, two 1:1 scale model Helldivers exist, having been produced for the 2005 film King Kong by production company Wingnut Films in New Zealand, in conjunction with The Vintage Aviator Limited (TVAL), a company specialising in vehicle model production. One of the two scale models is currently on display at Hood Aerodrome in Masterton, while the other is in storage at a facility in Wellington.

== Specifications Model 37H (A-3B) ==
Data from Curtiss Aircraft 1907–1947, United States military aircraft since 1909

General characteristics

- Crew: 2
- Length: 27 ft 7 in (8.41 m)
- Wingspan: 38 ft 0 in (11.58 m)
- Height: 10 ft 3 in (3.12 m)
- Wing area: 351 sq ft (32.6 m^{2})
- Airfoil: Clark Y
- Empty weight: 2,902 lb (1,316 kg)
- Gross weight: 4,476 lb (2,030 kg)
- Powerplant: 1 × Curtiss D-12E (V-1150-5) V-12 liquid-cooled piston engine, 426 hp (318 kW)
- Propellers: 2-bladed fixed-pitch propeller

Performance

- Maximum speed: 139.4 mph (224.3 km/h, 121.1 kn)
- Cruise speed: 111 mph (179 km/h, 96 kn)
- Range: 647 mi (1,041 km, 562 nmi) with 100 US gal (83 imp gal; 380 L) fuel
- Service ceiling: 14,400 ft (4,400 m)
- Rate of climb: 948 ft/min (4.82 m/s)

Armament

- Guns: 4 × forward-firing 0.30 in (7.62 mm) M1919 Browning machine guns and 2 × flexible 0.30 in (7.62 mm) Lewis guns on a Scarff ring in the rear cockpit.
- Bombs: 200 lb (91 kg) of bombs mounted on lower wing racks.

== See also ==
Related lists

- List of military aircraft of the United States

== Bibliography ==
- Layman, R. D. (1993). "Question 15/91: Early USN Aircraft". Warship International. XXX (3): 318. ISSN 0043-0374.
- Hagedorn, Dan (March–May 1992). "Curtiss Types in Latin America". Air Enthusiast. No. 45. pp. 61–77. ISSN 0143-5450.
- Hagedorn, Dan and Antonio Luis Sapienza. Aircraft of the Chaco War. Atglen, Pennsylvania: Schiffer Publishing, 2000. ISBN 0-7643-0146-2.
