= Curtis (disambiguation) =

Curtis or Curtiss is a given name and surname.

Curtis or Curtiss may also refer to:

== Places ==
=== United States ===
- Curtis, Alabama, an unincorporated community
- Curtis, Arkansas, an unincorporated community
- Curtis, Florida, an unincorporated community in Gilchrist County, Florida
- Curtis, Michigan, an unincorporated community in Portage Township, Mackinac County, Michigan
- Curtis Township, Michigan, a civil township in Alcona County, Michigan; includes Curtisville
- Curtis, Nebraska, a city in Frontier County, Nebraska
- Curtis, Washington, an unincorporated community in Washington
- Curtiss, Wisconsin, a village in Clark County, Wisconsin

=== Elsewhere ===
- Curtis (crater), formerly designated "Picard Z", a very small lunar crater in the western Mare Crisium
- Curtis, Spain, a municipality in the Province of A Coruña in the autonomous community of Galicia

== Companies ==
=== Curtis ===
- Curtis Publishing Company, American publisher
- Curtis Computer Products, American manufacturer of computer cables, accessories, and peripherals

=== Curtiss ===
- Curtiss Aeroplane and Motor Company, a former American aircraft manufacturer, among the companies that in 1929 merged to form Curtiss-Wright
- Curtiss Candy Company, a former American candy company, purchased by Nestlé in 1990
- Curtiss-Wright, an American manufacturer of aviation components, formerly a leading aircraft manufacturer

== Music ==
- Curtis (50 Cent album), a 2007 album by American rapper 50 Cent
- Curtis (Curtis Mayfield album), a 1970 album by American soul/funk artist Curtis Mayfield
- Curtis Institute of Music, an American conservatory located in Philadelphia, Pennsylvania

== Other uses ==
- Curtis (film), a 2021 film starring Dwight Henry
- Curtis (comic strip), an American comic strip syndicated by King Features, created and illustrated by Ray Billingsley
- Curtis Cup, an Anglo-American trophy for women amateur golfers
- curtis, a type of medieval estate, for which see Notitia de actoribus regis

== See also ==
- Justice Curtis (disambiguation)
