= Philippine Army Air Corps =

Air warfare branch of the Philippine Army from 1935 to 1947

Philippine Army Air Corps (PAAC) (also as "PAAC Infantry Battalion", 1942)
- Pulutong Himpapawid ng Hukbong Katihan ng Pilipinas
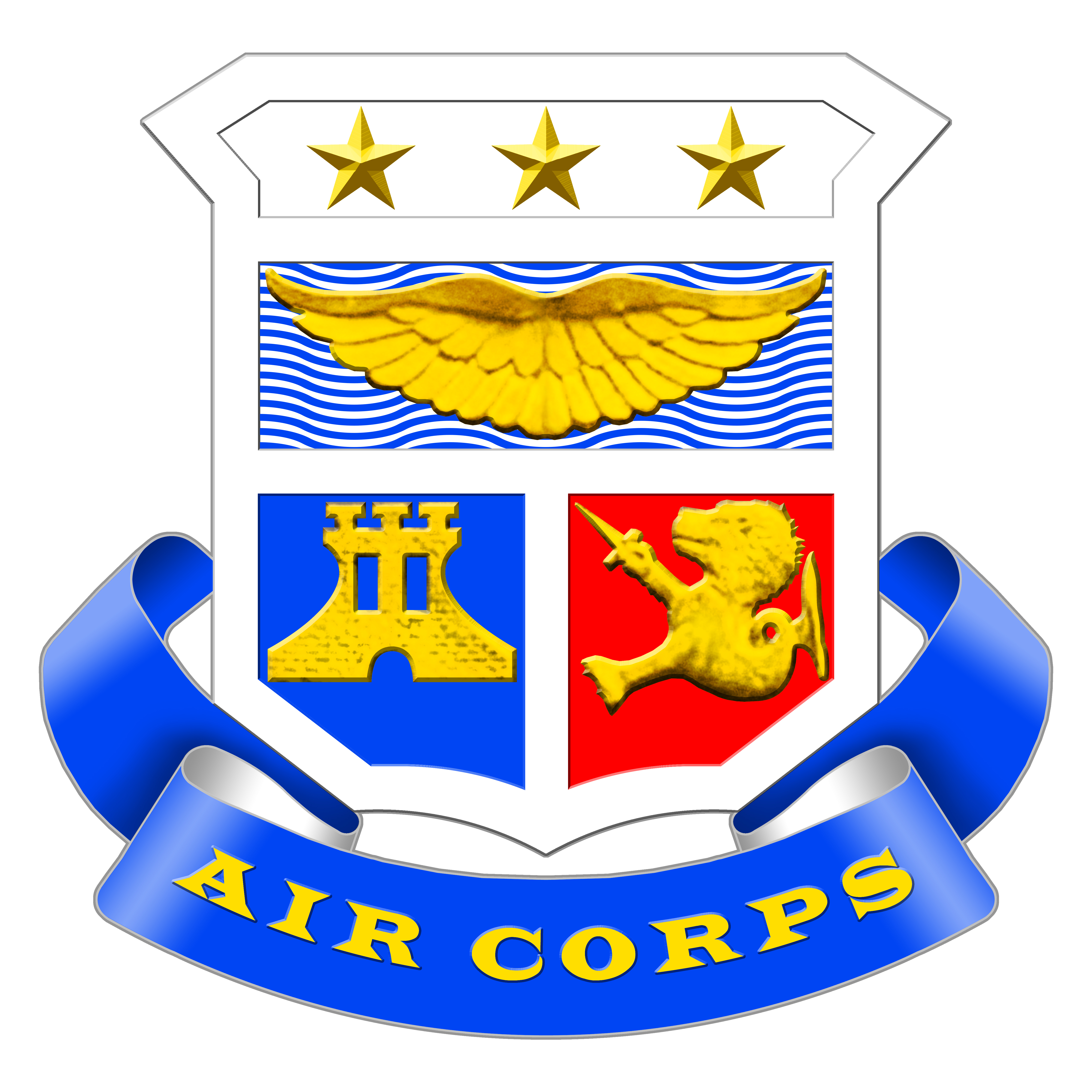
- Philippine Army Air Corps Emblem 1941–42
- Active: 1936 – after May 1942; May 1945 – 1 July 1947
- Country: Commonwealth of the Philippines; The Philippines
- Branch: U.S. Army; Philippine Army
- Type: Combat Flying Units; Infantry (after c.31 Dec 41)
- Size: Air Group; Infantry Battalion
- Part of: Far East Air Force
- Engagements: World War II: Battle of Bataan; Philippines campaign (1941–1942); Philippines Campaign (1944–1945)

Commanders
- Notable commanders: Maj. William L. Lee; Maj. Basilio Fernando; LCol. Charles A. Backes; Capt. Pelagio Cruz (PAAC Inf. Bn.); LCol. John Ryan; LCol. Edwin Andrews

Insignia
- Roundel

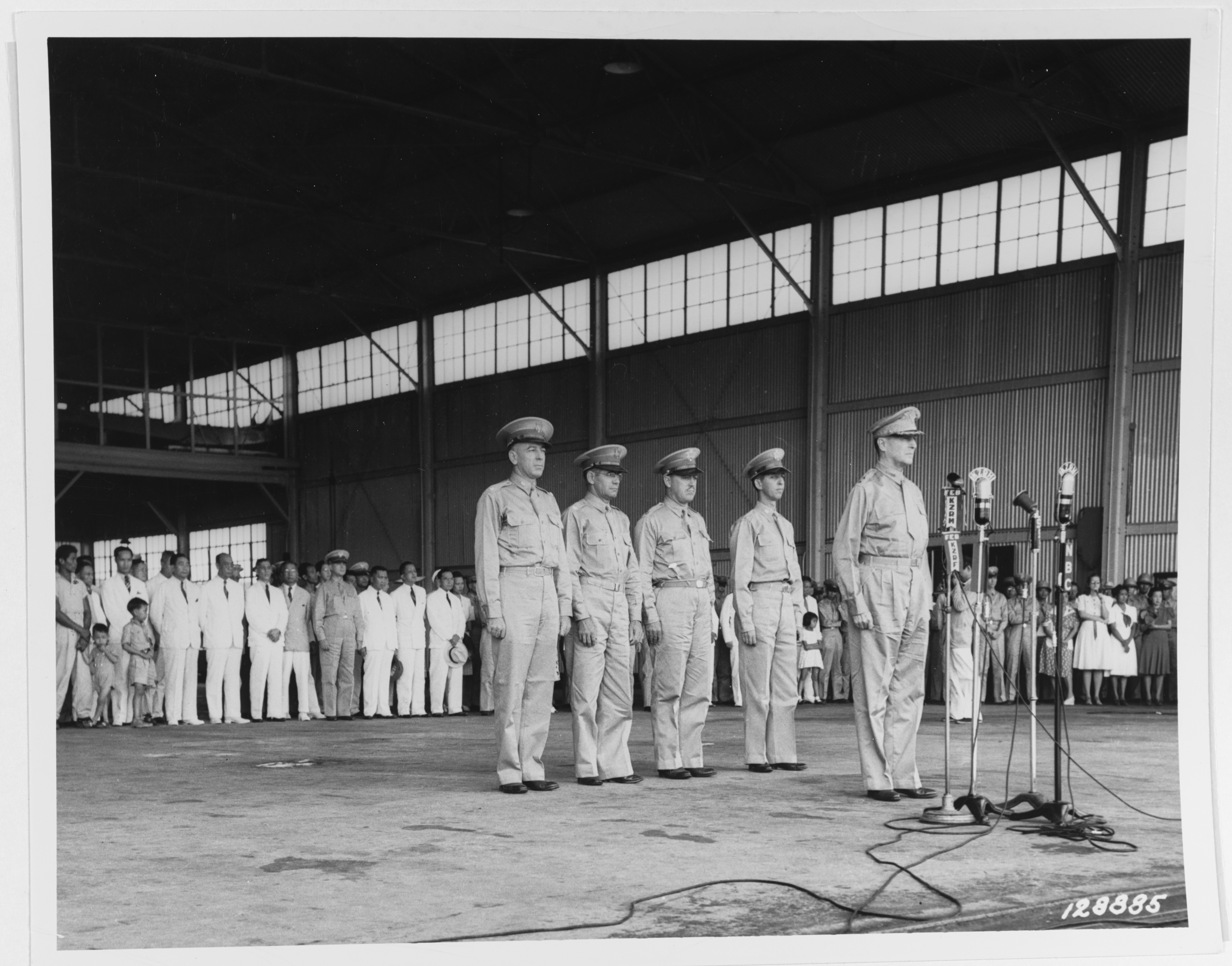
Ceremony at Camp Murphy in Rizal marking the induction of the Philippine Army Air Corps into the U.S. Army on 15 August 1941. Behind Lt. Gen. Douglas MacArthur, from left to right, are Lt. Col. Richard K. Sutherland, Col. Harold H. George, Lt. Col. William F. Marquat, and Maj. LeGrande A. Diller.

The Philippine Army Air Corps (Filipino: Pulutong Himpapawid ng Hukbong Katihan ng Pilipinas) was created in 1935 as the air component of the Philippine Army. It was the predecessor of the Philippine Air Force, created in 1947.

== History ==
The Air Corps was created by the Philippine National Assembly's National Defense Act of 1935 in its first legislative act.

General Douglas MacArthur, convinced by his friend Philippine President-elect Manuel L. Quezon and with President Roosevelt's agreement to leave his position as Chief of Staff, became Military Adviser to the Commonwealth Government in 1935. MacArthur was given wide authority to deal directly with the United States Secretary of War, his successor as the Army Chief of Staff and the United States Army Philippine Department and its commander Major General Lucius R. Holbrook who had been directed that his most important peacetime mission was assisting MacArthur in forming a Philippine force capable of defending the islands. MacArthur selected Majors Dwight D. Eisenhower and James B. Ord as his assistants who, with a special committee at the Army War College, prepared plans to form the national defense of the Philippine Commonwealth with a completion target of independence in 1946. That plan called for a small regular army with divisions of about 7,500 men, conscription with all men between twenty-one and fifty years of age eligible, with a ten-year training program to build a reserve army, a small air force and a fleet of torpedo boats capable of repelling an enemy.

The air corps was targeted to have by independence in 1946 approximately 100 bombers and additional tactical support aircraft to be used with the Off Shore Patrol of torpedo boats in coastal defense. When war came the corps had around 40 aircraft and 100 pilots, 500 personnel, and six squadrons. On 15 August 1941, the PAAC was inducted into the United States Army and incorporated into the Far East Air Force, with 141 pilots, 17 ground officers, 1,200 enlisted men, and 64 aircraft, with Maj. Basilio Fernando as its Commanding Officer. No less than Gen. MacArthur himself was the inducting officer at the Nichols Airfield in Pasay outside Manila.

The first Philippine Army airfield (Zablan Airfield) was built outside of Manila, Luzon in 1935. At this time only three pilot trainers were available in the Philippines. Courses in flying and technical training were given in the mainland United States to selected students. After the war the airfield was closed and became Camp Emilio Aguinaldo.

On 31 July 1941 the corps consisted of 2,132 enlisted troops, under the command of 275 officers:

- Headquarters (109)
- U.S. 4th Composite Group (1,393)
- U.S. 20th Air Base Group (842)
- Tow Target Detachment (42)
- Weather Detachment (21)

=== World War 2 ===
On 8 December 1941, despite receiving the news on the attack on Pearl Harbor early in the morning, the United States Army Forces in the Far East (USAFFE) and its air component, Far East Air Force (FAEF), were caught by surprise by bombers and fighters of the Imperial Japanese Army from Takao Airfield and Navy's Tainan Air Group from Tainan, Formosa, hitting targets in Baguio, Iba Airfield, and Clark Airfield. By the end of the day, the FAEF's aircraft inventory was reduced by half, with only a few squadrons surviving the initial raid, including the PAAC 6th Pursuit Squadron.

On 9 December, units of the PAAC attached to the Southern Luzon Force were ordered to do reconnaissance flight towards the South China Sea for any possible amphibious landing by the Japanese on the Batangas coastline.

The PAAC had its baptism of fire on 10 December. While the officers and men of the 6th Pursuit Squadron was having lunch, general quarters was sounded. Capt. Jesus Villamor, along with Lieutenants Godofredo Juliano, Geronimo Aclan, Alberto Aranzaso, and Jose Gozar met another wave of Mitsubishi G3M "Nell" bombers and Mitsubishi A6M Zero fighters over the skies of Zablan Airfield and Pasig with their Boeing P-26 Peashooters. The 6th Pursuit Squadron claimed 4 kills, one Mitsubishi Nell and 3 Zeros. Two of these were to the credit of Capt. Villamor. Another notable pilot was Lt. Jose Gozar. When his guns jammed, he instead attempted an aerial ramming of a Mitsubishi Nell. Lt. Albert Aranzaso followed suit.

The following day, 11 December, the 6th Pursuit Squadron relocated to Batangas Airfield, north of Batangas City. On 12 December, the airfield was attacked by a Japanese force comprising 27 bombers and 17 fighters. During the attack, a Filipino military aviator was killed in action.. Lt. Cesar Basa was on patrol has been flying for two hours and only had 15 minutes of fuel left when the Japanese arrived. Despite being outnumbered 7–1, Lt. Basa engaged the enemy and was still able to land his damaged aircraft in Nichols Airfield. However he was fatally wounded due to ground strafing by a Mitsubishi A6M Zero. Lt. Victor Osias tried to help his wingman, but Lt. Basa died in his arms.

The 6th Pursuit Squadron returned to Nichols Airfield on 13 December with 4 remaining P-26s, and on the following day another Japanese raid came, and Lt. Gozar was the only pilot who was able to meet the Japanese bombers and fighters. Lt. Gozar was able to survive the encounter against three Japanese Zeros with one unconfirmed kill, and land his battered aircraft.

Despite being heavily outnumbered, the 6th Pursuit Squadron's actions during the defence of Luzon became widely regarded as a source of inspiration among ground forces and civilians who witnessed its operations. On 15 December Capt. Villamor, Lt. Gozar, and Capt. Colin Kelly of the 14th Bombardment Squadron posthumously, were awarded by Gen. MacArthur the Distinguished Service Cross for their defense of the airspace above Manila. Lt. Godofredo Juliano on the other hand received a Gold Cross, and Lt. Aranzaso was awarded with the Silver Star.

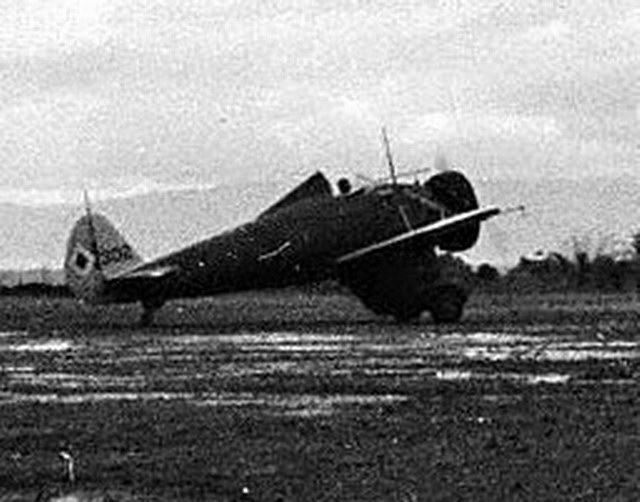
Former P-26 Peashooter used by the Philippine Air Corps (1941)

Upon activation of War Plan Orange, the 6th Pursuit Squadron and the rest of the PAAC were ordered to destroy their aircraft inventory. Capt. Villamor and his unit joined the rest of the USAFFE on a strategic retreat to Bataan and transformed their mission to air defense. The PAAC from hereon would take up infantry and air defense roles. Villamor would join Gen. MacArthur and Pres. Manuel L. Quezon on the ferry to Fort Mills on Corregidor Island on 24 December 1941. Capt. Villamor and his unit were still hoping to receive new aircraft from Australia. However, the shipment of the Pensacola Convoy never came through.

On 9 February 1942, Capt. Villamor conducted a reconnaissance mission over occupied Cavite in a PT-13 escorted by four American P-40 Warhawks. No sooner, 6 Japanese Zeros appeared and tangled with the FAEF aircraft. Capt. Villamor's aircraft was damaged but he was still able to land it safely. One P-40 was lost at the cost of 4 Zeros. Capt. Villamor's mission proved to be a success as the films were delivered to G-2 Intelligence. The information was collated with the ground observers' reports, and counterbattery fire was put into effect.

The four months siege of Bataan culminated on 9 April 1942, and about 80,000 emaciated and sick Filipinos and American POWs, including the surviving men of the PAAC, were committed to the infamous Bataan Death March. The 60 mile march ended at the POW Camp in Camp O'Donnell, Tarlac. Some of the members of the PAAC who were assigned to Corregidor Island were attached to the 4th Marine Regiment, and met the Japanese at the beaches during the Battle of Corregidor.

The Filipino POWs in Capas, Tarlac were released by August 1942, and the former members of the PAAC either transitioned back to civilian life, collaborated with the Japanese-sponsored Philippine government, or joined the underground guerilla movement. Famous of this was Capt. Villamor's escape to Australia and finding himself assigned to the Allied Intelligence Bureau as one of its operatives.

== Aircraft ==
=== As of 8 December 1941 ===
Numbers in parentheses indicate number of aircraft that were usable, where records are available.

==== Fighters ====
- Boeing P-12E: 2
- Boeing P-26A: 12
- Seversky P-35A: 48

==== Bombers ====
- Martin B-10B monoplane bomber: 3 (2)
- Keystone B-3A light bomber: 1

==== Noncombatant ====
- Beechcraft 18D trainer and utility transport aircraft: 2
- Douglas O-46 observation aircraft: 4
- Other (mainly trainers): 50
  - Boeing-Stearman 76D-4
  - Consolidated PT-1 Trusty trainers (73L-3)
  - Stinson Reliant
  - Curtiss O-1 observation/attack biplane
  - probably Thomas-Morse O-19 observation biplane

== Organization of The Philippine Army Air Corps as of 8 December 1941 ==
- Philippine Army Air Corps Headquarters
  - 1st Training Squadron
  - Zosa's Depot Detachment
  - Ramos' Depot Detachment
  - Sebastian's Airbase Detachment
  - 5th Photo Detachment
  - 6th Interceptor Squadron
  - Ebuen's Instruction Squadron
  - de Leon's Airbase Detachment
  - 9th Observation Squadron
  - 10th Bombardment Squadron
  - Aya-ay's Airbase Detachment
  - Primary Flying School
  - Basic & Advanced Flying School
  - Philippine Army Air Corps Supply

== See also ==
- Military history of the Philippines during World War II

=== Notable members ===
- Jesus Villamor, first Filipino pilot ace, AIB agent. US Distinguished Service Cross awardee.
- Pelagio Cruz, AFP Chief of Staff 1961 to 1963.
- Marcos Soliman, Superintendent PMA 1959, Director General NICA 1963-64, 1969 - 72
- Jose Gozar, US Distinguished Service Cross awardee
- Pedro Molina - PAF Commanding General 1966
- Edwin Andrews
- Basilio Fernando

== Bibliography ==
- Anido, Alberto (July 2000). "Le Philippine Army Air Corps dans la tourmente japonaise (1941–1942)" [The Philippine Army Air Corps in the Japanese Turmoil (1941–1942)]. Avions: Toute l'Aéronautique et son histoire (in French) (88): 6–10. ISSN 1243-8650.
- Bruno, Henri (October 2000). "Courrier des Lecteurs" [Readers' Letters]. Avions: Toute l'Aéronautique et son histoire (in French) (91): 4. ISSN 1243-8650.
- Morton, Lewis (1993). The War in the Pacific: The Fall of the Philippines. United States Army in World War II. Washington, D.C.: Center of Military History, United States Army. LCCN 53063678.
