= Justice Curtis (disambiguation) =

Justice Curtis refers to Benjamin Robbins Curtis (1809–1874), associate justice of the Supreme Court of the United States. Justice Curtis may also refer to:

- Howard J. Curtis (1857–1931), associate justice of the Connecticut Supreme Court
- Jehu Curtis (1692–1753), Colonial justice of the Delaware Supreme Court
- Jesse W. Curtis Sr. (1865–1960), associate justice of the Supreme Court of California
