= César Basa =

Filipino fighter pilot (1915–1941)

César Fernando María Basa
- Lt. César Basa
- Born: 21 June 1915; Isabela, Negros Occidental, Philippine Islands
- Died: 12 December 1941 (aged 26); Nichols Airfield, Philippine Commonwealth
- Military career
- Allegiance: Philippines; United States of America
- Branch: Philippine Army Air Corps
- Service years: 1939–1941
- Rank: Lieutenant
- Unit: Philippine Army Air Corps
- Conflicts: World War II; Battle of the Philippines
- Awards: Silver Star

César Fernando María Tianko Basa (21 June 1915 – 12 December 1941) was a Filipino military pilot who fought in World War II. He was one of the pioneer fighter pilots of the Philippine Army Air Corps, the forerunner of the Philippine Air Force, and was the first Filipino fighter pilot casualty during World War II.

== Early years ==
César Basa was born on 21 June 1915 to Fernando Basa and Rosario Tianko of Isabela, Negros Occidental. He finished his primary education in his home town, until the family moved to Manila, where his parents enrolled him at the Ateneo de Manila University. He took up a Bachelor of Science major in chemistry, and graduated in the class of 1939. In school he was known as a star player of their basketball team, and was a swimmer. Upon graduating from the ADMU, he joined the Philippine Army Flying School in Zablan Airfield in Camp Murphy, and received his commission as 2nd Lieutenant upon graduation in 1940.

== Death ==
On the morning of 12 December 1941, 27 Japanese bombers and 17 fighter escorts raided Batangas Field.

6 Filipino fighter pilots of the 6th Pursuit Squadron in Boeing P-26A "Peashooter" fighter planes, led by Captain Jesús Villamor, engaged the numerically superior enemy in aerial combat at 12,000 feet (3,700 m). Several dogfights ensued as Villamor and his men fought to prevent the pack of bombers and their fighter escorts from reaching and bombing Lipa Airfield.

Lieutenant Basa, still airborne after a two hour air-reconnaissance mission, rushed to the scene and attempted to join the aerial engagement with only 15 minutes' worth of fuel left in his P-26, but was intercepted by seven Japanese fighters and his aircraft disabled. He was able to return to Nichols Airfield and run for cover, but received a fatal head injury when a Japanese fighter strafed his aircraft. Lt. Victor Osias attempted to rescue him, but Basa expired in his arms, the first Filipino fighter-pilot casualty of the war.

Captain Villamor and his pilots won the battle (not true, Japanese tactical victory, Philippine symbolic victory), with the only casualty being Basa, who was posthumously awarded the Silver Star.

== Honors ==
Cesar Basa Air Base in Floridablanca, Pampanga, Philippines is named in his honor.
