= Jesús A. Villamor =

Filipino-American fighter pilot (1914–1971)

Jesús Antonio Villamor
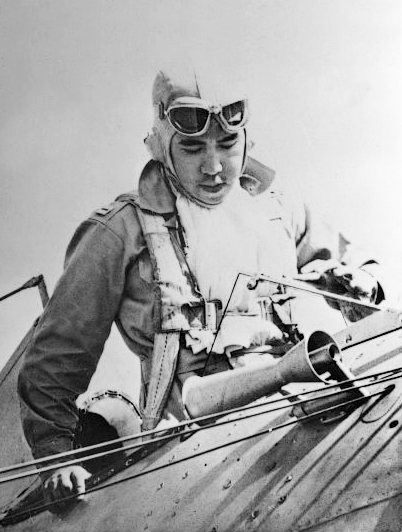
- Villamor exiting a plane upon returning from Batangas Field.
- Born: November 7, 1914; Bangued, Abra, Insular Government of the Philippine Islands
- Died: October 28, 1971 (aged 56); Washington, D.C., United States
- Relatives: Ignacio Villamor (father)
- Military career
- Allegiance: Philippines; United States
- Branch: United States Air Force; Philippine Army Air Corps
- Service years: 1936–1971
- Rank: Colonel
- Nickname: Jess
- Units: 6th Pursuit Squadron; Philippine Army Air Corps; Allied Intelligence Bureau; Military Assistance Advisory Group
- Commands: 6th Pursuit Squadron, Philippine Army Air Corps
- Conflicts: World War II; Battle of the Philippines
- Awards: (2x) Distinguished Service Cross with 1 Oak Leaf Cluster Legion of Merit Medal of Valor

Jesús Antonio Flores Villamor (November 7, 1914 – October 28, 1971) was a Filipino-American pilot, spy, and Medal of Valor awardee who fought the Japanese in World War II.

== Early life and career ==
Jesús Villamor was one of six children of Associate Justice of the Supreme Court, Ignacio Villamor (who had earlier convicted Philippine independence general Macario Sakay) of Bangued, Abra, and Mariquita Flores. He studied commerce at De La Salle College (now DLSU-Manila) in Manila, hoping to pursue a business career.

During summer, he and his family went to Baguio and stayed in one of the government houses on Hogan's Alley, which are now assigned to Justice of the Court of Appeals, just below Cabinet Hill along Leonard Wood Road. One of his playmates during this time was Roberto Lim, son of Brigadier General Vicente Lim. Roberto would later train under Villamor in a Stearman plane, and Villamor would also sign Lim's first civilian license.

Nicknamed “Jess”, at the age of 14 to 15, he was already an aviation enthusiast. As his father and uncles were lawyers, his parents were not too keen over his desire to take up flying and encouraged him to follow the family tradition of practising law. After his father's death his mother relented and encouraged Villamor to take up flying. He was worried his short height would disqualify him in the physical exam; nevertheless, Villamor learned how to fly with a Cox-Klemin Aircraft at the Philippine Air Taxi Corp. (PATCO) at the former Grace Park Airfield next to La Loma Cemetery. He earned his wings under PATCO's General Manager, Captain William "Jitter Bill" Bradford, who was later to become the head of the "Bamboo Fleet" which served as the lifeline of the USAFFE during the Battle of Corregidor. Villamor also learned under Instructor Pilots and World War I aviator veterans Bert Hall, Charlie Heston, and Don Kneedler.

After completing 20 hours of solo flying, Villamor proceeded to the Bureau of Aeronautics to apply for a pilot license, but failed the test. Bureau director Captain Russell Maughan commented that Villamor's flying was unsafe, and told Bradford that Villamor should never fly again. Hall, on the other hand, was disgusted with Maughan's rejection of Villamor. A few days later, Hall encouraged Villamor's mother to send him to the Dallas Aviation School in Texas. On his way to the United States, Villamor became acquainted with fellow students, Augusto Luciano and Rafael Roces Jr. Villamor would later earn his "Transport Pilot License" at the Dallas Aviation School.

Upon returning to Manila, Villamor found neither PATCO nor its competitor, Far Eastern Air Transport (FEATI), would have slots for him. Villamor then applied for a slot in the first batch of cadets of the Philippine Army Air Corps Flying School in 1936. He was joined with six other students: Lt. Antonio Alandy, Francisco Reyes, Ramón M. Zosa, Andrés O. Cruz, Jacob Ouiranle, and Azarías M. Padilla. The first batch learned under Lt. William "Jerry" Lee in a Stearman Model 73.

Villamor along with Francisco Reyes were later sent to Randolph Field in San Antonio, Texas for further training in 1936. En route to the United States, they had a stopover in Tokyo where they had the chance to examine a Mitsubishi A5M naval fighter. Reyes would later wash out from the class, but Villamor persisted in flying with the class, earning him the moniker "Little Chief Oompah." He would qualify in a Boeing P-12, and upon graduating on June 9, 1937, received news that he was going to be commissioned as 3rd Lieutenant in the PAAC.

== Military service ==
=== 94th Pursuit Squadron ===
Prior to returning to the Philippines, Villamor was sent to Selfridge Field in Detroit, to join the 94th Pursuit Squadron, under World War I top ace, Eddie Rickenbacker, flying Boeing P-26, along with World War II ace pilots John R. Allison and Philip Cochran.

=== Philippine Army Air Corps ===
Returning to Manila in 1938, Villamor was assigned as Stage Commander of the PAAC in Zablan Field in Camp Murphy, and by 1939 was promoted to 1st Lieutenant and Director of Flight Training. Here he would have the opportunity to train Lt. Col. Dwight D. Eisenhower, who would be the first President of the United States with a pilot's license, and Lt. Col. Richard Sutherland.

He also began flying B-17's as part of the US Army Air Forces Strategic Bombing Squadron.

Villamor was assigned to lead the 6th Pursuit Squadron (now the 6th Tactical Fighter Squadron) in Nichols Airfield. On July 26, 1941, by order of President Franklin D. Roosevelt, the Philippine Army was incorporated into the United States Army Forces in the Far East. Following this, PAAC was inducted into the Far East Air Force on August 15, with 141 pilots, 17 ground officers, 1,200 enlisted men, and 64 aircraft, with Maj. Basílio Fernando as its Commanding Officer. Gen. MacArthur himself was the inducting officer, and correctly forecasted that the Empire of Japan would attack between January and April 1942.

=== Battle of Zablan Field ===
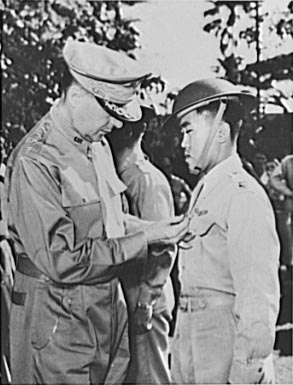
General Douglas MacArthur (left) is shown pinning a Distinguished Service Cross on Villamor for heroism in the air.

Eight hours after the attack on Pearl Harbor on December 8, 1941 10:00 am PST, bombers and fighters of the Imperial Japanese Army and Navy took off from Takao Airbase in Japanese-held Formosa and targeted sites around Baguio and Iba Airfield in Zambales, with a second wave attacking Clark Air Base and Naval Station Sangley Point. The next day, the FEAF's capabilities were crippled with half of its air assets destroyed, with the Japanese losing only seven aircraft in the two-day raid, giving them practical air superiority over northern Luzon.

With the FEAF crippled, the 6th Pursuit Squadron at Nichols Airfield was one of the remaining units available to meet the enemy. At 11:30 am on December 10, while the unit was having lunch, general quarters was sounded, and the PAAC would have its baptism of fire. Capt. Villamor, along with Lieutenants Godofredo Juliano, Gerónimo Aclan, Alberto Aranzaso, and José Gozar, met another wave of Mitsubishi G3M "Nell" bombers and Mitsubishi A6M Zero fighters over the skies of Zablan Airfield and nearby Pasig with their Boeing P-26 Peashooters.

Capt. Villamor was first to take off and meet the attackers, only to find himself greatly outclassed by the better Japanese fighters. A Japanese Zero gave chase, and Capt. Villamor manoeuvred his aircraft to shake off his opponent. He dove his P-26 and hugged the treetops of the Marikina Valley and even flew under high-tension wires. The Japanese pilot gave up the chase thinking he had hit the ground. Capt. Villamor then pulled up only to find himself being pounced by another Japanese Zero. He swung his aircraft on a vertical left bank, putting it on a stall but training his guns towards a face-to-face engagement with the enemy. The Japanese pilot was surprised by the manoeuvre, but Capt. Villamor was able to fire at the wings of the Zero, which burst into flames. This was the first confirmed kill by the PAAC.

Despite the disadvantage, Capt. Villamor and his squadron was credited with four kills – one Mitsubishi G3M bomber and three Mitsubishi A6M Zeros. Two kills were credited to Villamor. Upon landing his aircraft, Capt. Villamor was met by the Philippine Army Chief-of-Staff, Gen. Basílio Valdés, who asked of him if he was afraid the whole time, with Capt. Villamor confirming he was.

=== Battle of Batangas Field ===
The following day, the 6th Pursuit Squadron moved to Batangas Airfield north of Batangas City. Around noon of December 12, a force of 27 bombers and 17 fighters targeted Batangas Airfield. The PAAC flight group of 5 P-26s headed by Capt. Villamor scrambled to meet the closer flight of enemy bombers heading south. Lt. César Basa, sent on a reconnaissance mission two hours before, joined the flight as Capt. Villamor's wingman. Swooping from a higher elevation, Capt. Villamor and the PAAC flight attacked the lead aircraft of the Japanese Mitsubishi G3M "Nell" bomber, scoring his second kill in the war. The Japanese Zeros pursued the defenders, and in the ongoing melée the PAAC relied on cloud-cover and outmanoeuvred the faster Zeros with tighter turns.

Lt. Basa meanwhile kept on Capt. Villamor's tail, but was soon pounced on by a Japanese Zero. His aircraft was damaged and wings broke off, but Lt. Basa was able to bail out of his P-26. Basa's bullet-riddled body was later found, and according to Capt. Villamor's account, the former was shot down by Japanese fighters while parachuting. Lt. Basa became the first Filipino casualty in aerial combat.

Lt. Antonio Mondingo meanwhile was also shot by a Japanese attacker and was forced to bail out, rescued by civilians upon landing. Lt. Manuel Conde also suffered the same, but was able to land his P-26 in Zablan Field. However, his aircraft exploded moments after he exited and took cover from the onslaught of Japanese strafing. At the conclusion, the Japanese lost two bombers, while the PAAC lost three aircraft.

The 6th Pursuit Squadron returned to Nichols Airfield on December 13, with four remaining P-26s. The following day, Lt. Gozar for the last time in the war was able scramble by himself to meet Japanese raiders. Lt. Gozar was able to survive the encounter against three Japanese Zeros with one unconfirmed kill, and land his battered aircraft.

While outclassed and outnumbered, the accomplishments of the 6th Pursuit Squadron have become legendary among ground forces and civilians who witnessed the defence they mounted in the skies of Luzon. On December 15 Capt. Villamor, Capt. Colin Kelly, and Lt. Gozar were personally awarded by Gen. Douglas MacArthur the Distinguished Service Cross for defending the airspace above Manila. Lt. Gozar's wingmate, Lt. Godofredo Juliano, received the Gold Cross.

=== Retreat to Bataan ===
Upon activation of War Plan Orange, the 6th Pursuit Squadron and the rest of the PAAC were ordered to destroy their aircraft inventory. Capt. Villamor and his unit were ordered to a strategic retreat to Bataan and transformed their mission to air defense. He would join Gen. MacArthur and President Manuel L. Quezon on the ferry to Fort Mills on Corregidor Island on December 24, 1941. Capt. Villamor and his unit were still hoping to receive new aircraft from Australia. However, the shipment of the Pensacola Convoy never came through.

For leading his squadron, Capt. Villamor was twice cited by the United States Army for bravery, receiving the Distinguished Service Cross for actions on December 10, 1941, and an Oak Leaf Cluster in lieu of a second award of the Distinguished Service Cross (DSC) for actions on December 12, 1941. Villamor is the only Filipino to receive the DSC twice.

Gen. Harold Huston George, head of the Far East Air Force was tasked by MacArthur to conduct an aerial photography mission over Ternate, Cavite to search for the artillery placement of Maj. Toshinori Kondo. Gen. George had tasked Capt. Villamor for this mission. On February 9, 1942, Capt. Villamor conducted a reconnaissance mission over occupied Cavite in a PT-13, escorted by four American P-40 Warhawks. Capt. Villamor was on the student-pilot seat, while Sgt. Juan V. Abanes from the 5th Photographic Squadron volunteered to operate the camera. Six Japanese Zeros appeared, and while Capt. Villamor's aircraft was damaged he was still able to land it safely. One P-40 was lost at the cost of four Zeros. Capt. Villamor's mission proved to be a success, as the films were delivered, information was collated with ground observers, and counter-battery fire was put into effect.

=== Escape to Australia ===
At the end of February 1942, orders were relayed that half of the PAAC and FEAF officers were to be evacuated from Bataan and Corregidor, and report south to Del Monte Airfield in Bukidnon. Capt. Villamor was among the selected officers, and they found themselves on the SS Legaspi, which would run the Japanese blockade. Upon reaching Mindanao, Capt. Gozar and the PAAC and FAEF officers reported to Del Monte Airfield.

At Del Monte Airfield, Capt. Villamor continued to conduct reconnaissance missions in the Visayas and Mindanao aboard a Stearman. In one occasion he would witness a Japanese aerial attack on a lone PT Boat in the waters off Bohol. After Gen. Edward P. King surrendered the USAFFE in Bataan, Capt. Villamor would witness the last attempts at an aerial counterattack in the Philippines on April 11 by the Royce Mission's bombers. By April 14, Capt. Villamor was evacuated to Australia on a B-25 Mitchell Bomber along with Nat Floyd of The New York Times and Col. Chi Wang, the Chinese military attaché to the Philippines.

On landing in Australia, Capt. Villamor had the opportunity to report to Gen. MacArthur and President Quezon. He begged to be given aircraft for his squadron and return to the Philippines to continue fighting. Gen. MacArthur only gave him his word that he will return to the Philippines soon. A few days later, Capt. Villamor received instructions to report to the 35th Fighter Group in Williamstown near Melbourne, where he would be assigned as Director of Ground Training and Senior Flight Instructor on Curtiss P-40 Warhawks. Here, he would reconnect with his old friend and aviation maverick Paul "Pappy" Gunn, who was known to have made supply runs to Corregidor from Del Monte Airfield. Both men wanted to return to the Philippines and fight. Capt. Villamor approached another old friend in MacArthur's staff in Brisbane, Maj. Joseph Ralph McMicking, a Filipino-Scottish-American reserve officer with the PAAC. Capt. Villamor had taught Maj. McMicking in Zablan Airfield, and both shared some time in the PAAC before the war.

Maj. McMicking listened to Capt. Villamor, and agreed that he could become useful for another mission to the Philippines. McMicking lead Villamor to an office and was introduced to Col. Allison Ind, and Villamor realized this was the Allied Intelligence Bureau. Col. Ind knew who Capt. Villamor was, and told him of the need by the Allies to connect with the guerrillas in the Philippines, and brought him his superior, BGen. Charles Willoughby. Within that meeting, it was decided to give Villamor a cover story that he was to be transferred to the 91st Air Depot Group in Amberly.

=== Intelligence service ===
From August to December, Villamor now serving with the Allied Intelligence Bureau identified and trained with other Filipino officers in commando operations and espionage with Australian special operations units. During this period, SWPA was also able to connect with guerrilla leaders, namely Lt. Col. Macario Peralta. On Christmas Day 1942, Villamor was promoted to major.

On December 27, 1942, Villamor and his team, now called Planet Party boarded the submarine USS Gudgeon at the Brisbane River docks, and sailed towards the Philippines, arriving in Hinoba-an on southwest coast of Negros Island on January 27, 1943. Planet Party initially made contact with Roy Bell on Negros. Villamor went on to work with Bell, who would then make contact with James M. Cushing in 1943. Villamor's party was hosted by Filipino-Spanish mestizo Estanislao Bilbao.

Villamor would leave Hinoba-an for Sipalay to identify a safe location for their radio station, hiking through the hills to avoid Japanese spies. He then tasked his guerrilla liaison to contact the local guerrilla leader, Maj. Salvador Abcede in the Tantauayan Mountain area of Cauayan. Abcede provided Villamor a thorough briefing of guerrilla forces and operations in the Visayas, also disclosing his contention with Maj. Plácido Ausejo, who recognized the authority of Lt. Col. Wendell Fertig. At this time, Fertig also promoted himself to General, which Abcede believed was unauthorised. Villamor felt he needed to meet with the various factions and bring everyone under tactical unity.

After a month of conducting initial surveys and contacting guerrilleros in the Visayas, Villamor's Planet Party was able to establish a chain of direct communication to General Douglas MacArthur. Villamor would later coordinate the activities of various guerrilla movements in Luzon, Mindanao and the Visayas. Completing his mission, Villamor returned to Australia. Villamor's reports from the field were met with indifference by some within the SWPA, but were later publicly lauded by President Dwight Eisenhower.

=== Military Assistance Advisory Group ===
After World War II, Villamor served with the Military Assistance Advisory Group in the State of Vietnam in 1951, 1952, and 1955.

== Death ==
Ret. Col. Villamor died on October 28, 1971, in Georgetown University, Washington, D.C., United States, and was buried with military honors at the Libingan ng mga Bayani in Fort Bonifacio, Taguig, about two kilometers from the Philippine Air Force Headquarters which bears his name. His cause of death was lung cancer.

== Awards ==
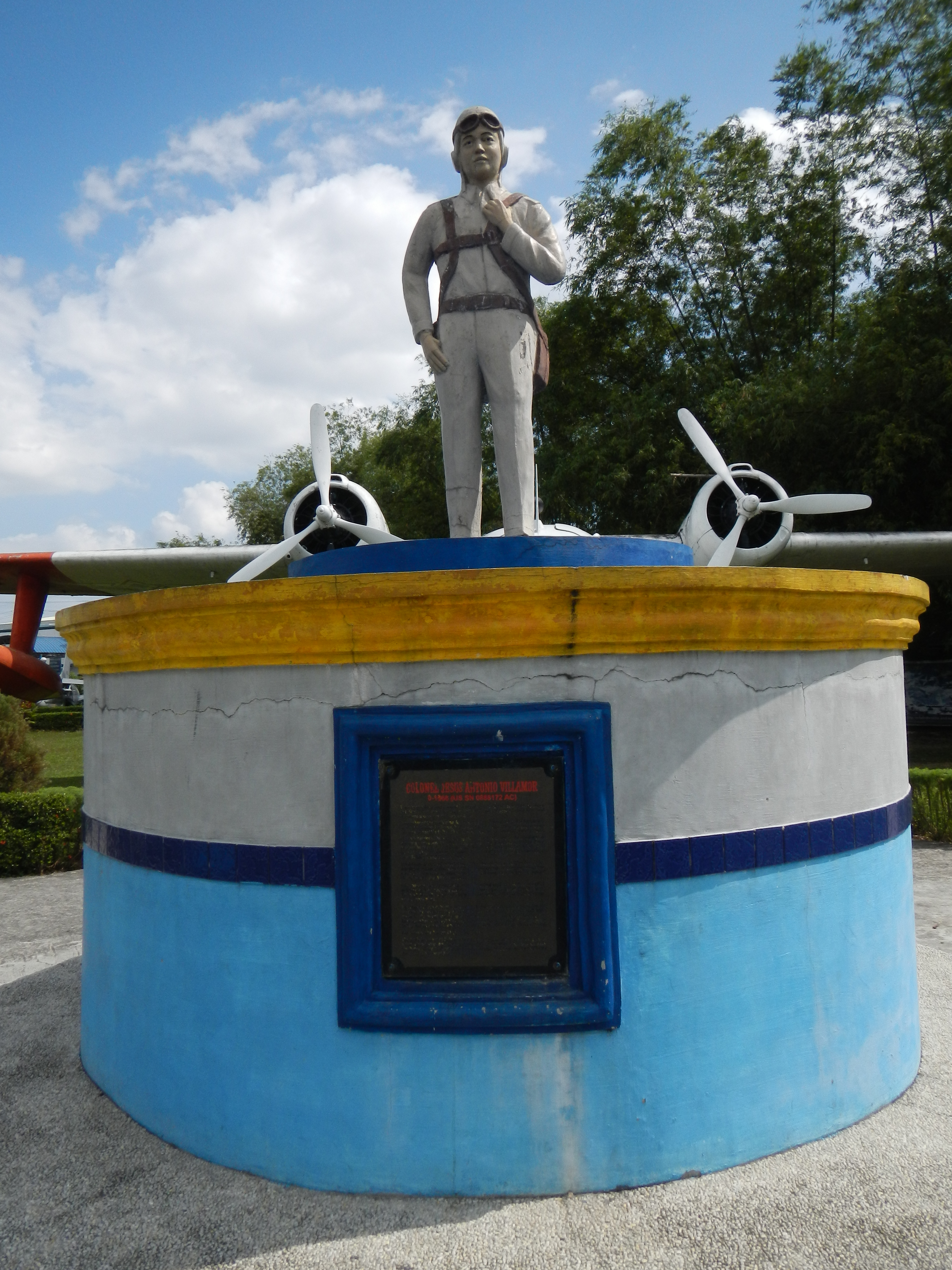
Villamor Air Base Monument

For his bravery as a pilot and ingenuity as an intelligence officer, President Ramón Magsaysay awarded Lieutenant Col. Villamor the Medal of Valor, the highest Philippine military decoration, on January 21, 1954. In addition, Villamor was a two-time recipient of the Distinguished Service Cross, and a recipient of the Distinguished Conduct Star. The Philippine Air Force's principal facility in Metro Manila which was first known as Nichols Field then later Nichols Air Base, was renamed Col. Jesús Villamor Air Base in his honor.

=== Distinguished Service Cross Citation ===
AWARDED FOR ACTIONS DURING World War II

Service: Foreign
Battalion: 6th Pursuit Squadron, Division: Philippine Army Air Corps
Headquarters, U.S. Army Forces in the Far East, General Orders No. 48 (1941)

The President of the United States of America, authorized by Act of Congress July 9, 1918, takes pleasure in presenting the Distinguished Service Cross to Captain (Air Corps) Jesus A. Villamor (ASN: 0-888072), Philippine Army Air Corps, for extraordinary heroism in connection with military operations against an armed enemy while serving as Pilot of a P-26 Fighter Airplane in the 6th Pursuit Squadron, Philippine Army Air Corps, attached to the Far East Air Force, in aerial combat against enemy Japanese forces on 10 December 1941, during an air mission over Batangas, Philippine Islands. In the face of heavy enemy fire from strong air forces, Captain Villamor led his flight of three pursuit planes into action against attacking Japanese planes. By his conspicuous example of courage and leadership at great personal hazard beyond the call of duty his flight was enabled to rout the attacking planes, thereby preventing appreciable damage at his station. Captain Villamor's unquestionable valor in aerial combat is in keeping with the highest traditions of the military service and reflects great credit upon himself, the Philippine Army Air Corps, and the United States Army Air Forces.

== See also ==
- List of American guerrillas in the Philippines
