= 20th Air Base Group =

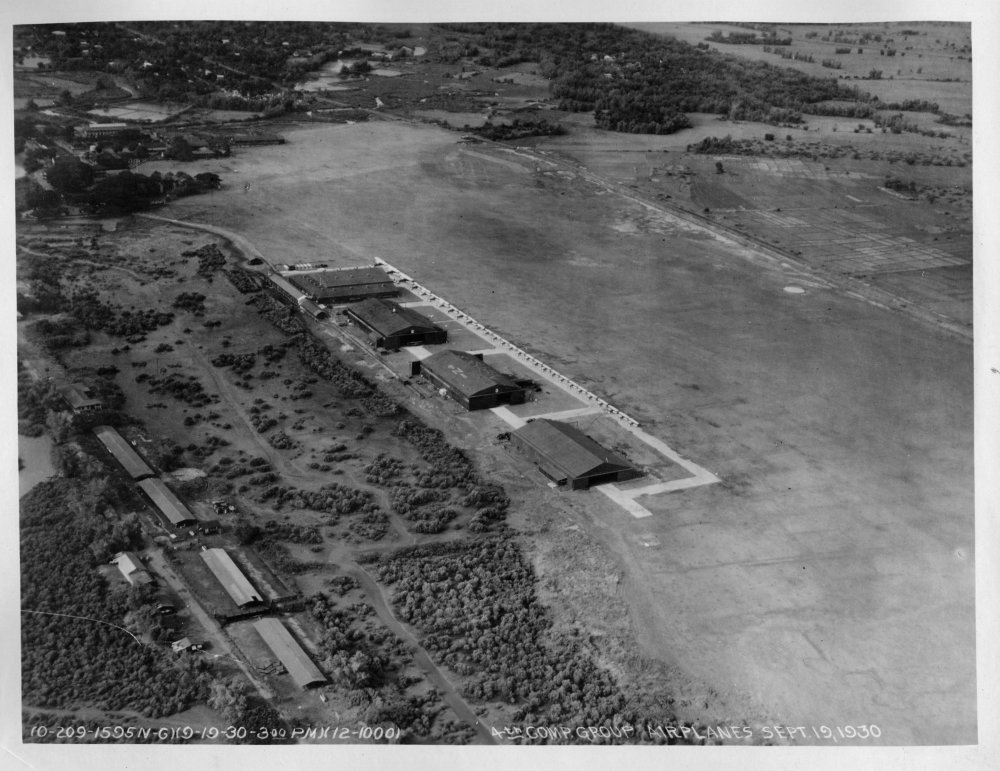
- Nichols Field in 1930
- Active: 1918, 1921-1946
- Country: United States
- Branch: United States Army Air Corps
- Type: Support
- Role: Maintenance and Base Administration
- Part of: Far East Air Force
- Engagements: Southwest Pacific Theater
- Decorations: Distinguished Unit Citation Philippine Republic Presidential Unit Citation

Insignia
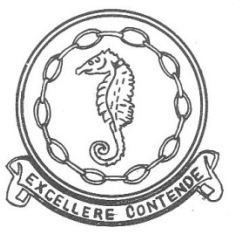
- Base Headquarters & 20th Air Base Sq emblem

The 20th Air Base Group is a disbanded group of the United States Air Force. It was part of the Far East Air Force, during World War II. The group was based at Nichols Field, in the Philippines. It surrendered to the Japanese in the spring of 1942, but was kept on the rolls as an active unit until April 1946. It was disbanded in 1984.

The Unit's first predecessor, the 66th Aero Squadron served at a training base during World War I. It was consolidated with the 66th Service Squadron, which had provided maintenance support at Nichols Field since 1921. In the late 1930s, the unit assumed administrative support functions as well and was expanded to a group.

The first unit holding the name 20th Air Base Group was active up until 1942, and is where the majority of this article focuses. However, a second unit, the 20th Airdrome Group, was renamed the 20th ABG in 1948, remaining as part of the 20th Fighter Wing. It later became the 20th Mission Support Group, and is still supporting the 20th Fighter Wing.

== History ==
=== World War I ===
The first predecessor of the group was the 66th Aero Squadron, (Note: The unit is not related to an earlier 66th Aero Squadron, organized in August 1917, which had been renumbered as the 478th Aero Squadron (Construction).) which was organized in April 1918 at Kelly Field, Texas. As soon as the squadron was organized it moved to Eberts Field, Arkansas to join the flying school there. In the summer of 1918, the Air Service reorganized its units at its flying schools as lettered squadrons and the squadron became Squadron A, Eberts Field. Shortly after the end of the World War I, the squadron was demobilized and its personnel were absorbed by the Flying School Detachment at Eberts Field.

=== Interwar years in the Philippines ===
In June 1921, Air Park No. 11 was organized at Clark Field, Philippines, moving to what became Nichols Field before the end of the year. In 1923, the Air Service renamed its air parks as service squadrons and the unit became the 66th Service Squadron, with the mission of providing second level maintenance for the aircraft of the 4th Composite Group at Nichols. Due to post-war shortages in officers, garrison units in the Philippines were manned assigned only 50% of their authorized officer personnel through the first half of the 1920s.

In 1936 the Air Corps consolidated many of its World War I Aero Squadrons with units formed after the war but bearing the same number, and the old 66th Aero Squadron was consolidated with the post-war 66th Squadron.

In 1938, the Air Corps reorganized its support units and the 66th was consolidated with the Station Complement, Nichols Field as the Base Headquarters and 20th Air Base Squadron. In the fall of 1940, air base squadrons expanded into groups and were assigned materiel squadrons for maintaining aircraft and air base squadrons to provide administrative support, and the unit became the 20th Air Base Group.

=== Defense of the Philippines ===
The 20th Group's station at Nichols Field came under Japanese air attack as World War II began in the Pacific. Although Far East Air Force had built up to the largest American overseas force in terms of personnel, much of its equipment was en route when the Japanese attacked. As the war began, the group supported the 2d Observation Squadron, 17th Pursuit Squadron and 34th Pursuit Squadron at Nichols. Three days after the start of the war, 10 December 1941, saw the first concentrated Japanese attacks on Nichols. By the end of the attack all observation airplanes at Nichols had been destroyed or rendered unserviceable. By 24 December, all bombers had been flown to Australia and air force headquarters and all combat units except for a few fighters soon followed.

By the end of December, all American forces were being withdrawn to Bataan. Colonel Harold H. George, of 5th Interceptor Command assumed control of all Air Corps units remaining in the Philippines. With the flying mission being performed by a handful of fighter pilots, the bulk of the group's personnel were employed as infantry. By May 1942, resistance in the Philippines had ended and the group ceased to exist as an organized military formation.

== Lineage ==
Squadron A, Eberts Field

- Organized on 26 April 1918 as 66th Aero Squadron

Redesignated Squadron A, Eberts Field c. 1 July 1918

- Demobilized 15 November 1918

Reconstituted and consolidated with 66th Service Squadron on 16 October 1936

20th Air Base Group

- Authorized as Air Park No. 11 and organized on 2 June 1921

Redesignated 66th Service Squadron on 25 January 1923
Consolidated with Squadron A, Eberts Field on 16 October 1936
Consolidated with Station Complement, Nichols Field as the Base Headquarters & 20th Air Base Squadron on 25 May 1938
Redesignated Base Headquarters & 20th Air Base Squadron (1 Group) on 6 December 1939
Redesignated Base Headquarters & 20th Air Base Squadron (Single) on 1 February 1940
Redesignated Headquarters & Headquarters Squadron 20th Air Base Group (Reinforced) on 1 September 1940
Inactivated on 2 April 1946

- Disbanded on 27 September 1984

Station Complement, Nichols Field

- Activated c. 1 March 1935 as Station Complement, Nichols Field

Consolidated with 66th Service Squadron as Base Headquarters & 20th Air Base Squadron on 25 May 1938

=== Assignments ===
- Primary Flying School, Eberts Field, 26 April 1918 – 15 November 1918
- 1st Group (Composite) (later 4th Composite Group), 2 June 1921
- Philippine Department, 1 September 1936
- Philippine Department Air Force (later Far East Air Force), 20 September 1941
- Far East Air Service Command (later 5th Air Force Base Command, 5th Air Force Service Command, V Air Force Service Command), 16 November 1942 – 2 April 1946

=== Stations ===
- Kelly Field, Texas, 26 April 1918
- Eberts Field, Arkansas, ca. 1 May 1918 – 15 November 1918
- Clark Field, Philippines, 2 June 1921
- Camp Nichols (later Nichols Field), Philippines, 21 December 1921 – 1942

=== Components ===
- Air Base Squadron, 20th Air Base Group (later 19th Air Base Squadron), 1 September 1940 – 2 April 1946
- 1st Materiel Squadron, 20th Air Base Group (later 27th Material Squadron), 1 September 1940 – 2 April 1946
- 2d Materiel Squadron, 20th Air Base Group (later 28th Material Squadron), 1 September 1940 – 2 April 1946
- 745th Ordnance Company, Aviation (Air Base), attached, c. May 1941 – 2 April 1946
- Air Corps Detachment, Weather, Philippines, 2 January–20 September 1941

=== Awards and campaigns ===
Award streamer	Award	Dates	Notes
	Distinguished Unit Citation	7 December 1941-10 May 1942,	20th Air Base Group
	Distinguished Unit Citation	8 December 1941–22 December 1941	20th Air Base Group
	Distinguished Unit Citation	6 January 1942-8 March 1942	20th Air Base Group
	Philippine Republic Presidential Unit Citation	7 December 1941 – 10 May 1942	20th Air Base Group

Campaign Streamer	Campaign	Dates	Notes
	Philippine Islands	7 December 1941 – 10 May 1942	20th Air Base Group

== See also ==
- Battle of Bataan
- United States Army Air Service
- Bataan Death March
- Commonwealth of the Philippines
