= Villamor Air Base =

Airbase of the Philippine Air Force

- Pasay City, Philippines
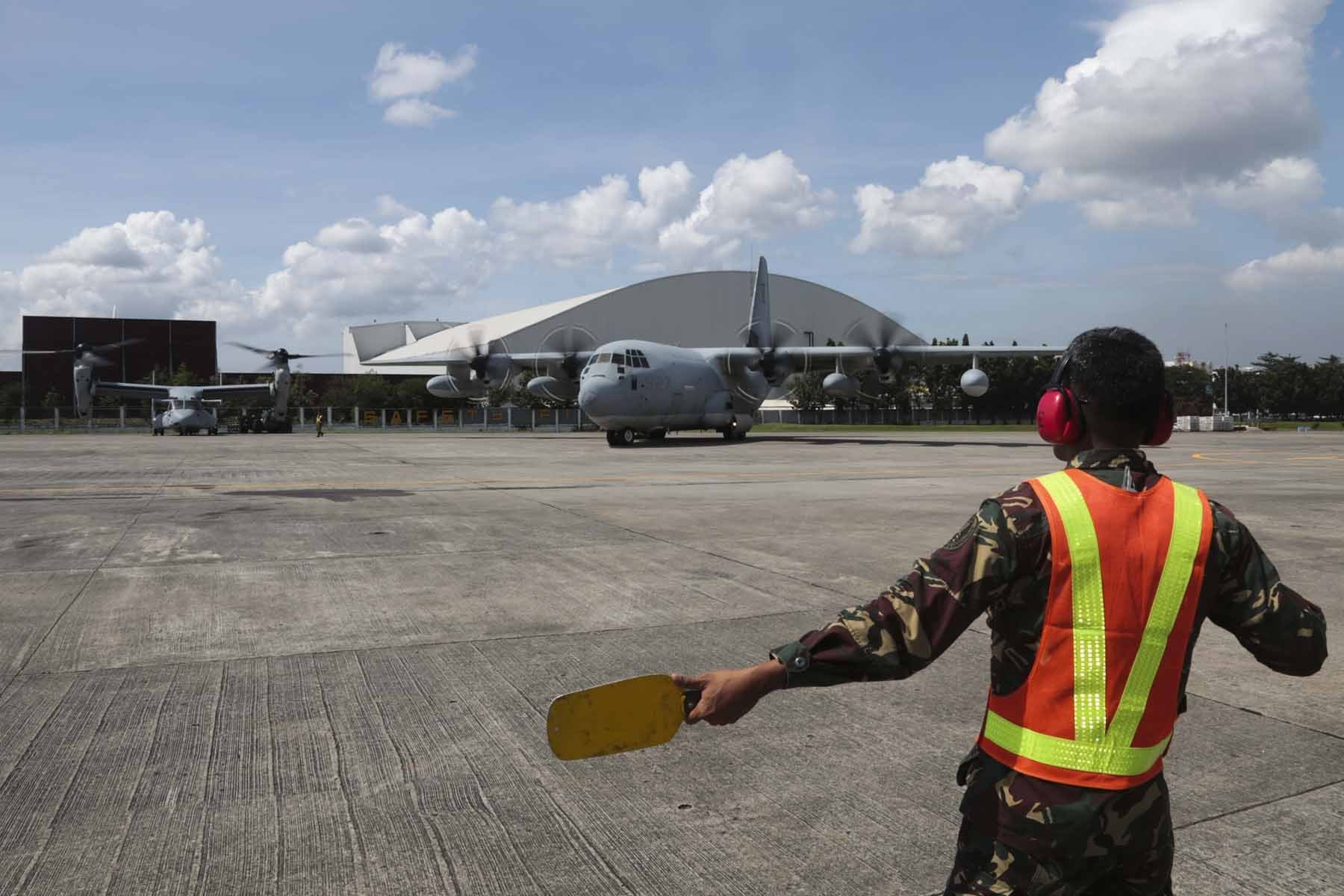
- The Airbase in 2013

Site information
- Type: Airbase
- Owner: Philippines
- Controlled by: Philippine Air Force
- Condition: Active, as of 2016

Location
- Coordinates: 14°30′31″N 121°01′10″E

Site history
- Built: 1919
- Built by: United States
- In use: 1919–present
- Battles/wars: World War II
- Events: Philippines campaign (1941–42); Philippines campaign (1944–45)

Villamor Air Base
- IATA: MNL; ICAO: RPLL

Summary
- Airport type: Public/Military
- Operator: Philippine Air Force
- Serves: Manila
- Elevation AMSL: 23 m (75 ft)
- Coordinates: 14°30′31″N 121°01′10″E
- Website: www.paf.mil.ph

Map
- Location in the Philippines

Runways
Direction	Length		Surface
Direction	m	ft	Surface
06/24	3,737	12,260	Asphalt
13/31	2,367	7,766	Asphalt

Colonel Jesus Villamor Air Base, known simply as Villamor Air Base (IATA: MNL, ICAO: RPLL), is the headquarters of the Philippine Air Force (PAF) and shares runways with Ninoy Aquino International Airport (NAIA). It was formerly known as Nichols Field or Nichols Air Base. Chiefly used as a PAF transport/helicopter airbase, the Maharlika Hall located at the base is used by the president and vice president of the Philippines when departing for foreign or domestic trips. Also, foreign dignitaries visiting Manila would usually arrive at the air base.

The base is named after Filipino World War II pilot Jesús A. Villamor.

== History ==
The air base was built as Nichols Field in 1919 by the United States during the insular government era and in 1941, was used as an airfield by the United States Army Air Forces in the South West Pacific Theatre. The field was the location of the U.S. Far East Air Force's U.S. 20th Air Base Group. Also, based at the field was Troop F of the 26th Cavalry Regiment.

A Fifth Air Force base, Nichols Field was within the territory of Imperial Japan during their occupation of the Philippines from December 1941 to January 1945.

=== Nichols Air Base ===
Designated Nichols Air Base after Philippine independence, in 1997, the base was reduced to make way for construction of Ninoy Aquino International Airport Terminal 3 and Newport City.

In 2010, the AVSECOM van (called by some as "Ninoy Aquino's death van") which had carried the body of Ninoy Aquino to the hospital after his assassination in 1983 was found rotting inside Nichols Air Base (now called Villamor Airbase). This was reported only two years later by ABS-CBN News. Photos of this "death van" were subsequently posted on the blog site of the Filipino investigative journalist, Raissa Robles, who reported the discovery.

== Gallery ==
Villamor Air Base
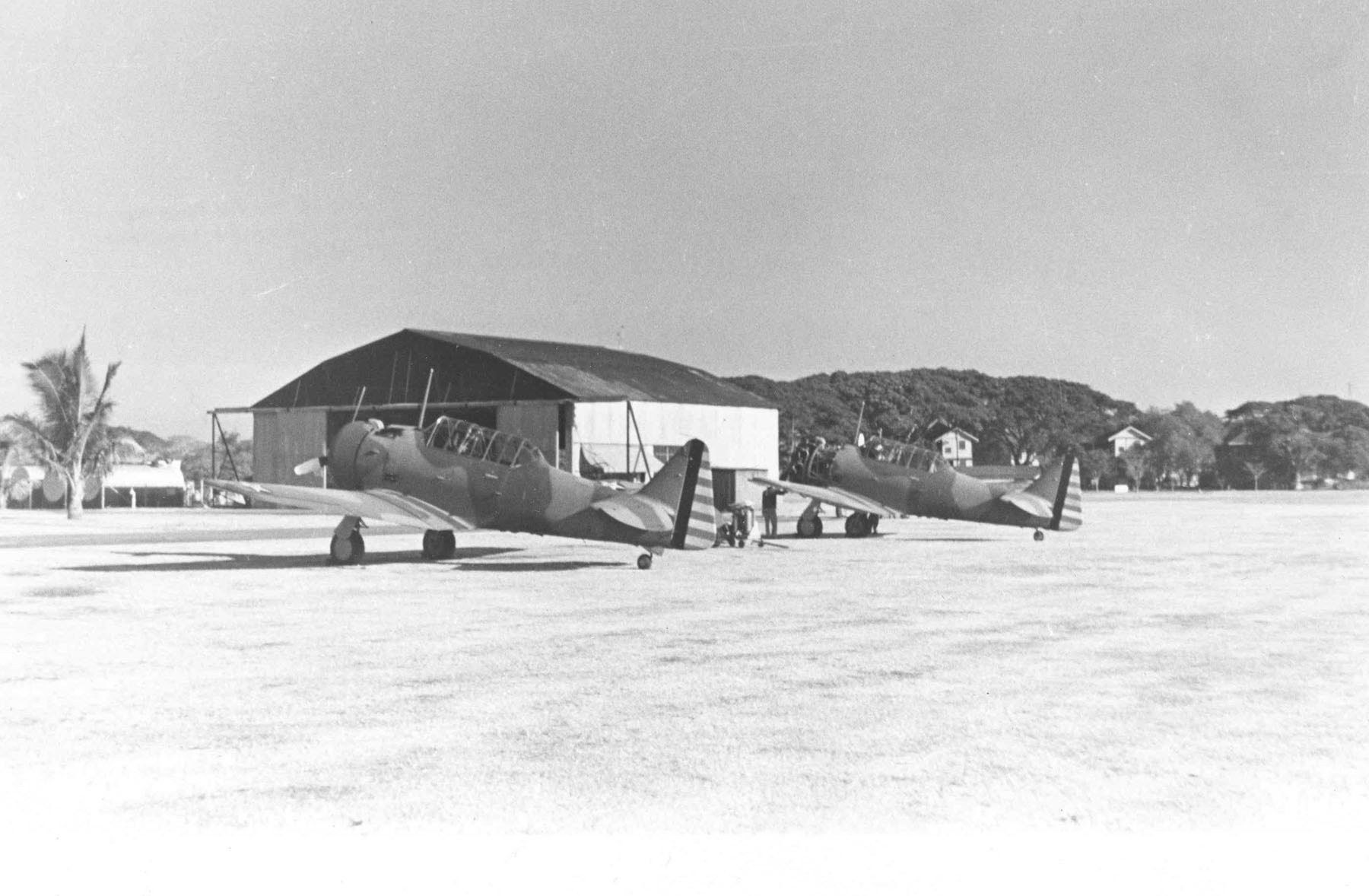
Two North American A-27s of the 17th Pursuit Squadron at Nichols Field in 1941.

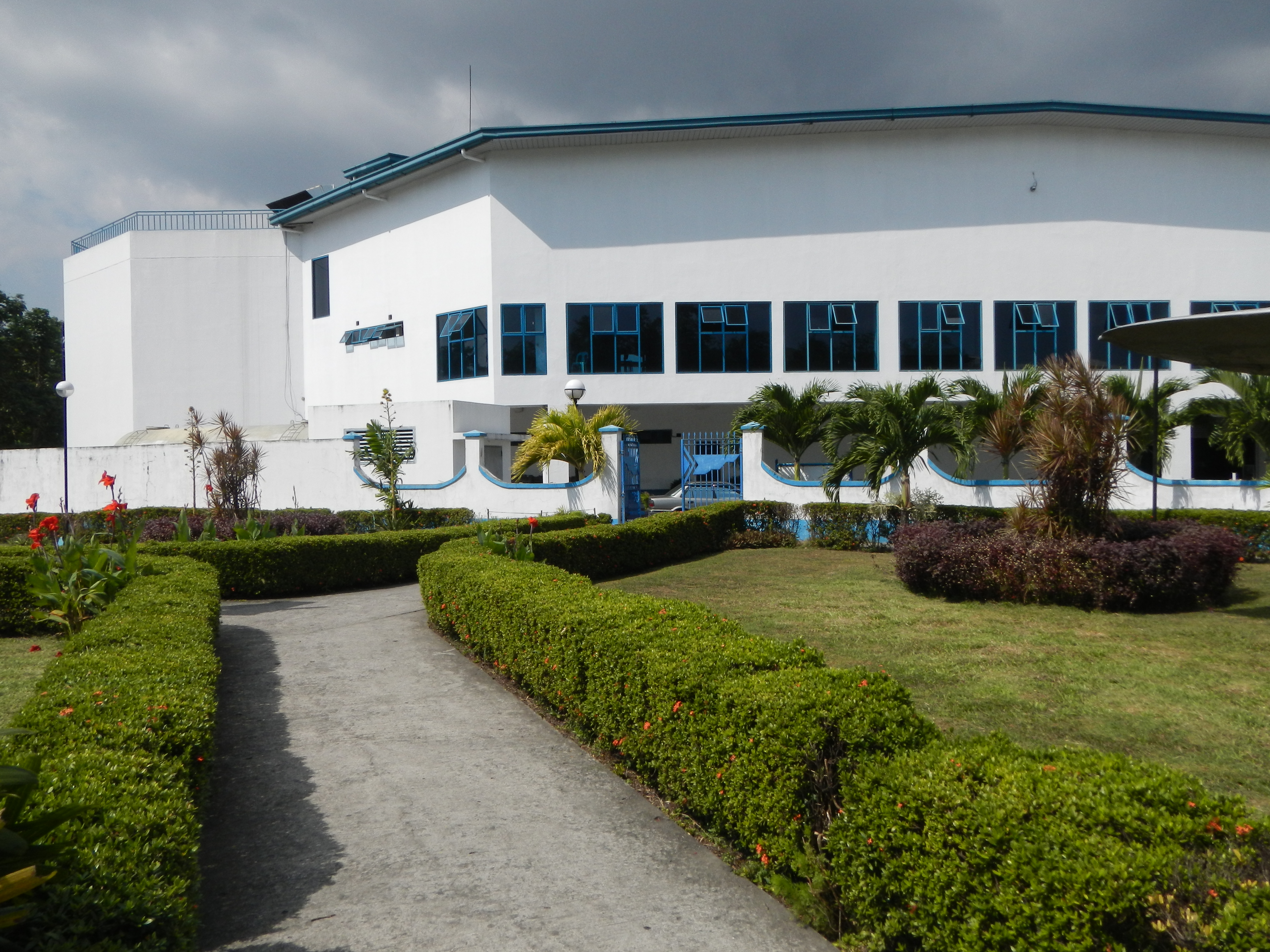
Façade of the Philippine Air Force Aerospace Museum
